= Peter Hollens =

American singer

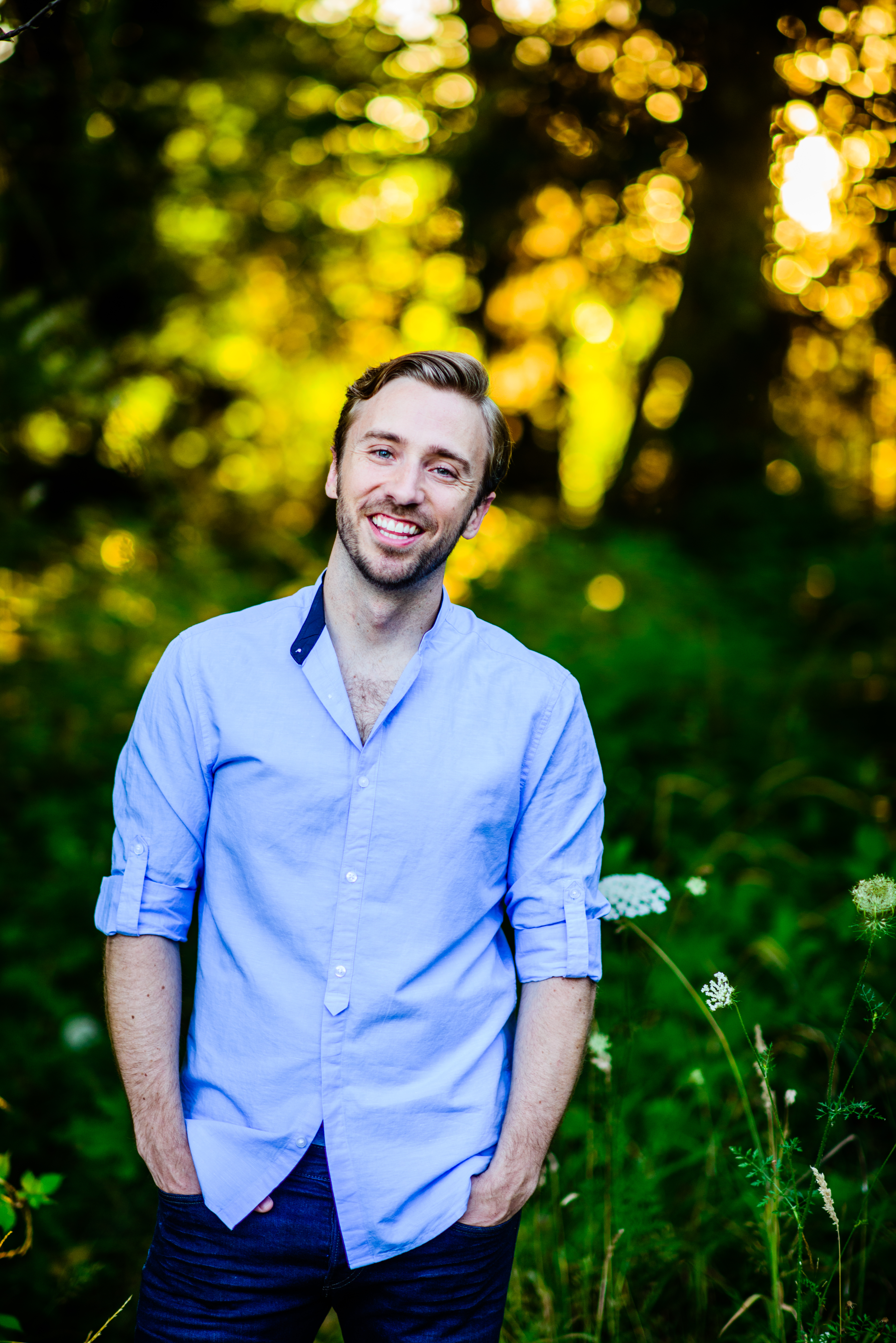
- Hollens in 2014

Background information
- Born: Peter James Hollens; Ashland, Oregon, U.S.
- Origin: Eugene, Oregon, U.S.
- Genres: Classically trained vocalist; a cappella
- Occupations: Vocalist; YouTuber; entrepreneur
- Instruments: Vocals; vocal percussion
- Years active: 2002–present
- Website: peterhollens.com

YouTube information
- Channel: PeterHollens
- Years active: 2011–present
- Genre: Music
- Subscribers: 3.29 million
- Views: 966.3 million

Peter James Hollens is an American singer-songwriter, producer and entrepreneur. He has been involved with a cappella music since 1999 when he and Leo da Silva founded the University of Oregon's a cappella group, On The Rocks, known as the first official collegiate a cappella group in Oregon. He regularly releases new music videos to his YouTube channel. With over 9+ million followers and over 3 million subscribers, his content has received over a billion total views since 2011.

== Life and career ==
Hollens was born in Ashland, Oregon, to James and Deborah (née Melone) Hollens. He graduated from the University of Oregon with a Bachelor of Music in Vocal performance. Since his graduation from the University of Oregon, Hollens has become involved with collegiate a cappella, including recording, producing, and judging a cappella competitions throughout the United States. In 2010, he participated in NBC's The Sing Off, working with music director Deke Sharon and receiving acclaim from The Sing-Off judges Shawn Stockman, Nicole Scherzinger and Ben Folds for solo performances leading his group, On The Rocks. They were eliminated 6th out of the 10 groups performing.

Hollens records and produces from his home studio in Eugene, Oregon, and also has recorded for Sony and Epic Records. Hollens's recordings include tracks for "The Sing-Off Season 2-Greatest Hits" as well as many collegiate a cappella albums for such groups as On the Rocks, the University of Oregon's Divisi, Cornell's Chordials, the Doox of Yale and the Whiffenpoofs (also from Yale.) He has also recorded Sing-Off Season 2 winners, Committed, the Backbeats, and the Grammy Award-winning group The Swingle Singers.

In 2011, he started his own YouTube channel, mostly posting music videos with multi-tracked a cappella covers. Repeatedly teaming up with other artists, he frequently collaborates with Lindsey Stirling and Taylor Davis. As of April 13, 2023, his channel has over 2.95 million subscribers. To support his musical endeavors, Hollens joined the newly founded crowdfunding platform Patreon in 2013. In an interview in March 2017 he mentions he's become an adviser for Patreon. In 2012 he released his first album.

In 2014 he signed a deal with Sony Masterworks; later he considered this a mistake and cut ties with the label in 2015. Hollens released a self-titled album on October 27 of that year.

In 2015, he performed guest lead vocals for Brian Wilson's album No Pier Pressure on the song "Our Special Love".

In 2016, Hollens teamed up with Home Free, the winners of The Sing-Off Season 4, to record an all-vocal arrangement of the hymn "Amazing Grace". "I had the absolute honor of working with Home Free on this one," Hollens states in a video message at the close of the song's YouTube release. "I love these guys, they are so talented and fun. We have worked together once before on a video called "19 You + Me".

Hollens debuted on Broadway in the show "Home For the Holidays, Live on Broadway" which was presented November 17 to December 30, 2017, at the August Wilson Theatre. On December 12, 2017, he was a guest on The Piano Guys live stream called 'Light The World Christmas Concert with The Piano Guys and Friends', in which he made a comment that he is in "Home For the Holidays, Live on Broadway" and would be getting a cab to the theatre.

== Personal life ==
In 2007, Hollens married Evynne Hollens (née Smith), co-founder of the a cappella group Divisi. Evynne has her own YouTube channel, posting music videos, occasionally collaborating with her husband. She co-wrote a musical called "Milagro", which was first performed in 2018. The couple performed in their first Broadway show, Home for the Holidays, in November 2017. They have two sons named Ashland (b. 2014) and Saylor (b. 2018).

== Discography ==
- 2012: Hollens [HD]
- 2012: Covers Vol. 1
- 2012: Covers Vol. 2
- 2014: Peter Hollens
- 2016: Misty Mountains: Songs Inspired by The Hobbit and Lord of the Rings
- 2016: A Hollens Family Christmas
- 2017: Covers Vol. III
- 2018: Legendary Folk Songs
- 2018: The Greatest Showman A Cappella
- 2019: Legendary Covers Volume 1
- 2019: Magically Legendary Covers Volume 1
- 2020: Legendary Covers, Vol. 2: INSPIRE
- 2020: A Legendary Vocals Christmas

== Awards and nominations ==
Year	Award	Category	Nominee(s)	Result	Ref.
2013	Contemporary A Cappella Recording Awards	Best Song by a Solo Performer	"Shenandoah" on Covers Vol. 2	Won	
2014	Contemporary A Cappella Recording Awards	Best Song by a Solo Performer	"I See Fire"	Won	
2015	Game Audio Network Guild Awards	Best Game Music Cover/Remix	"Baba Yetu" (Civilization IV) feat. Malukah	Finalist	
2015	Contemporary A Cappella Recording Awards	Best Folk/World Song	"Black is the Color of My True Love's Hair" feat. Avi Kaplan	Won	
2015	Contemporary A Cappella Recording Awards	Collaborative and Solo Performer Awards/Best Pop/Rock Song	"Dark Horse" feat. Sam Tsui	Nominated	
2016	Game Audio Network Guild Awards	Best Game Music Cover/Remix Award	Assassin's Creed Syndicate – "Underground"	Won	
2016	Contemporary A Cappella Recording Awards	Collaborative and Solo Performer Awards/Best Song by a Solo Performer	"Now We Are Free"	Won	
2017	A Cappella Video Awards	Outstanding Collaborative Video	"Hamilton – An Acappella Medley"	Won	
2017	A Cappella Video Awards	Outstanding Special Effects	"Hobbit Drinking Medley"	Runner-up	
2017	A Cappella Video Awards	Best Musical / Soundtrack Video	"Hamilton – An Acapella Medley"	Runner-up	
2018	A Cappella Video Awards	Best Folk/World Video	"Desert Rose"	Won	
2018	A Cappella Video Awards	Best Holiday Video	"Carol of the Bells" feat. BYU Vocal Point, One Voice Children's Choir, and BYU Men's Chorus	Runner-up	
2019	A Cappella Video Awards	Outstanding Collaborative Video	"From Now On"	Won	
2019	A Cappella Video Awards	Outstanding Special / Visual Effects	"Tightrope"	Runner-up	
2020	A Cappella Video Awards	Outstanding Collaborative Video	"Hands of Gold & Rains of Castamere"	Won	
2020	A Cappella Video Awards	Outstanding Video Editing	"The Lion King vs. Aladdin"	Nominated	
2020	A Cappella Video Awards	Best Country Video	"Take Me Home, Country Roads"	Won	
2020	A Cappella Video Awards	Best Show Tunes / Soundtrack / Theme Song Video	"The Lion King vs. Aladdin"	Nominated	
2021	A Cappella Video Awards	Outstanding Collaborative Video	"Prince of Egypt" Peter Hollens ft. BYU Vocal Point	Nominated	
2021	A Cappella Video Awards	Outstanding Costume / Makeup	"Epic Halloween Medley" Peter Hollens	Runner-up	
2021	A Cappella Video Awards	Best Folk / World Video	"Fire and Rain" Peter Hollens ft. Tim Foust	Nominated	
2021	A Cappella Video Awards	Best Humor Video	"The Epic Hand Washing Parody" by Peter Hollens	Runner-up	
2021	A Cappella Video Awards	Best Show Tunes / Soundtrack / Theme Song Video	"Epic Dreamworks Impressions Medley" Peter Hollens ft. Brian Hull	Nominated	
