= The Exchange (band) =

American a cappella band

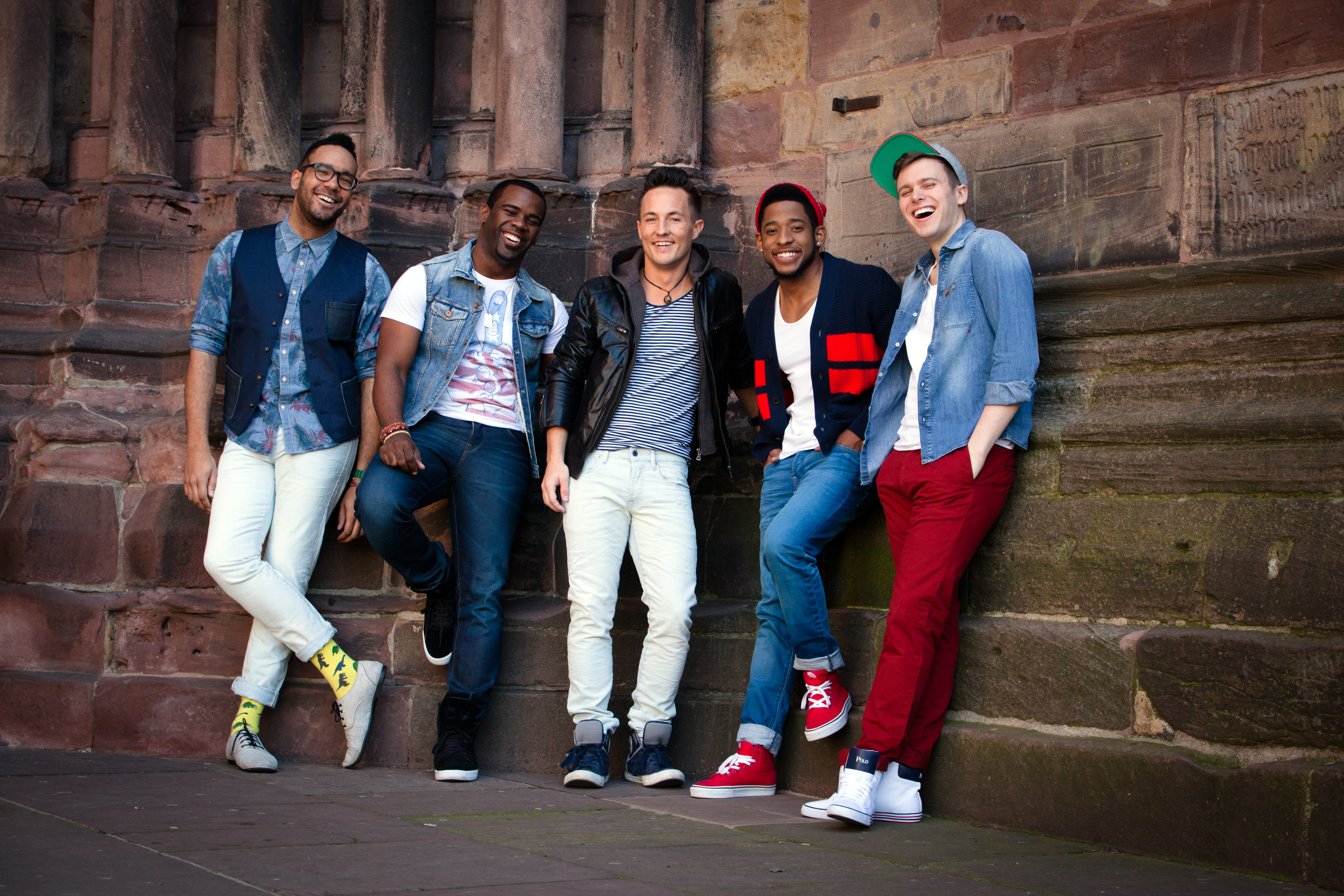
- The Exchange during a 2014 photo shoot in Freiburg, Germany. From left to right: Christopher Diaz, Alfredo Austin, Richard Steighner, Jamal Moore, and Aaron Sperber.

Background information
- Origin: Rochester, New York, United States
- Genres: A cappella, Pop
- Years active: 2012–present
- Members: Aaron Sperber; Alfredo Austin; Christopher Diaz; Jamal Moore; Richard Steighner
- Website: exchangevocal.com

The Exchange is an a cappella band from the United States founded in 2012 by Rochester, NY native Aaron Sperber. The group consists of Aaron Sperber, Alfredo Austin, Christopher Diaz, Jamal Moore, and Richard Steighner. The band was a finalist on Season 5 of NBC's musical reality television show "The Sing-Off" and also performed as the Backstreet Boys' opening act during the 2014 “In a World Like This” European tour.

Sperber, Moore, and Steighner were also each contestants on Season 3 of "The Sing-Off". Sperber and Moore competed with the University of Rochester YellowJackets while Steighner was a member of Denver, Colorado based group Urban Method. Diaz served in a coaching role on the show.

== Get Ready ==
After an initial series of performances in 2012, in January 2013 The Exchange released their first album. Titled ‘Get Ready’, the album is entirely a cappella and primarily a cover album, featuring 9 cover tracks and 1 original track by member Christopher Diaz. Following the release of ‘Get Ready’, the group embarked on an international tour that included performances in the United Kingdom, Australia, Hong Kong, Taiwan, Austria, Germany, and Switzerland.

== “The Good Fight” and Backstreet Boys Tour ==
In February 2014, The Exchange released their first all original album titled “The Good Fight”. The Good Fight was the second album released by The Exchange. The album marked The Exchange's departure from purely a cappella music to music featuring vocals over tracked instruments. The EP features 6 original songs. Days after the release of “The Good Fight” album, The Exchange served as the opening act for the European leg of the Backstreet Boys In a World Like This Tour.

== The Sing-Off (Season 5) & Sing-Off Live Tour ==
In December 2014 The Exchange appeared on Season 5 of NBC's “The Sing-Off”. The band finished as finalists behind the Vanderbilt Melodores. Following their appearance on NBC's “The Sing-Off”, the band partook in The Sing-Off Live Tour. Joining The Exchange on the tour was Voice Play of The Sing-Off (season 4) and Street Corner Symphony of The Sing-Off (season 2). The tour was also featured on a live stream concert hosted by Yahoo! Live.

== "Pursuit" ==
Released March 1, 2015, Pursuit is The Exchange's third album. Pursuit is entirely a cappella, featuring 6 covers and 1 original song written by band members Alfredo Austin and Jamal Moore.

== Discography ==
=== Get Ready - 2013 ===
Track number	Track name	Track length	Written By
1	Domino	4:39	Claude Kelly, Henry Walter, Jessica Cornish, Lukasz Gottwald, Max Martin
2	Lonely Boy	4:04	Dan Auerbach, Patrick Carney, Brian Burton
3	Payphone	3:58	Adam Levine, Ammar Malik, Benny Blanco, Robopop, Shellback, Wiz Khalifa
4	Home	3:06	Drew Pearson, Greg Holden
5	I Feel Good	2:45	James Brown
6	Where Have You Been	4:10	Calvin Harris, Ester Dean, Geoff Mack, Henry Walter, Lukasz Gottwald
7	Take Me Away	3:06	Science, Ne-Yo
8	Sexy, Free & Single	3:45	Yoo Young-jin, Daniel Klein, Thomas Sardorf, Lasse Lindorff
9	See You Soon	3:43	Christopher Diaz
10	Can't Hold Us	4:34	Ben Haggerty, Ryan Lewis, Ray Dalton

=== The Good Fight - EP - 2014 ===
Track number	Track name	Track length	Written By
1	Déjà Vu	3:21	Alfredo Austin, Jamal Moore, Tat Tong
2	Get Up and Go	4:02	Richard Steighner, Christopher Diaz, Tat Tong
3	Kerosene	3:24	Matthew Lukasiewicz, Aaron Sperber, Tat Tong
4	Back Where We Began	3:42	Alfredo Austin, Tat Tong
5	Gone	3:10	Alfredo Austin, Jamal Moore, Tat Tong
6	The Good Fight	4:19	Christopher Diaz, Tat Tong

=== Single Release: Kerosene (Party Remix) - 2014 ===
The "party remix" version of Kerosene, Track 3 from the group's second EP release The Good Fight, was produced by The Exchange and Rick Markowitz, and mixed by Paul Kaleka. This version of the track is a more upbeat take on the song.

=== Pursuit - 2015 ===
Track number	Track name	Track length	Written By
1	Sing	2:47	Ed Sheeran, Pharrell Williams
2	Gone	3:29	Alfredo Austin, Jamal Moore, Tat Tong
3	Love Runs Out	3:09	Ryan Tedder, Brent Kutzle, Drew Brown, Zach Filkins, Eddie Fisher
4	Feelings	3:08	Adam Levine, Shellback, Oscar Görres
5	G.D.F.R.	3:12	Tramar Dillard, Dominic Woods, Lucas Rego, Mike Caren
6	Uma Thurman	3:13	Patrick Stump, Pete Wentz, Joe Trohman, Andy Hurley, Liam O'Donnell, Jarrel Young, Waqaas Hashmi
7	Uptown Funk	3:21	Jeff Bhasker, Philip Lawrence, Bruno Mars, Mark Ronson
