= Hollens =

Hollens is a surname. Notable people with the surname include:

- Evynne Hollens (born 1977), American singer
- Peter Hollens (born 1982), American singer-songwriter, producer and entrepreneur
