= The Sing-Off season 1 =

The Sing-Off
- Season 1
- Hosted by: Nick Lachey (NBC)
- Judges: Ben Folds; Shawn Stockman; Nicole Scherzinger
- Winner: Nota
- Runner-up: Beelzebubs

Release
- Original network: NBC
- Original release: December 14 – December 21, 2009

Season chronology
- Next → Season 2

The first season of The Sing-Off premiered on December 14, 2009. The show featured eight a cappella groups performing popular songs live. The winner's prize was $100,000 and a Sony Music recording contract. Nick Lachey hosted, while Ben Folds of Ben Folds Five, Shawn Stockman from Boyz II Men and Nicole Scherzinger from The Pussycat Dolls were judges. The show ran for 4 episodes, concluding on December 21, 2009 with a live finale. The group Nota won the title.

== Groups ==
Contestant	School	Finish	Number of members
Nota; San Juan, Puerto Rico	NA	Winner	6
The Beelzebubs; Medford, Massachusetts	Tufts University	Second Place	12
Voices of Lee; Cleveland, Tennessee	Lee University	Third Place	10
The SoCals; Los Angeles, California	University of Southern California	Eliminated; Episode 3	8
MAXX Factor; Baltimore, Maryland	NA	Eliminated; Episode 3	4
BYU Noteworthy; Provo, Utah	Brigham Young University	Eliminated; Episode 2	9
Solo; Omaha, Nebraska	NA	Eliminated; Episode 1	7
Face; Boulder, Colorado	NA	Eliminated; Episode 1	6

== Elimination table ==
Legend

Eliminated	Last safe	Safe	Third	Runner-up	Winner

Date:		12/14	12/15	12/16 (A)	12/16 (B)	12/21
Place	Group	Result				
1	Nota	1st (1)	1st	3rd	2nd	Winner
2	Beelzebubs	1st (2)	2nd	1st	1st	Runner-Up
3	Voices of Lee	3rd (1)	3rd	2nd	3rd	Third Place
4	The SoCals	2nd (2)	4th	4th	Eliminated	
5	Maxx Factor	3rd (2)	5th	Eliminated		
6	Noteworthy	2nd (1)	Eliminated			
7	Solo	Eliminated (2)				
8	Face	Eliminated (1)				

== Performances ==
=== Episode 1 (December 14, 2009) ===
- Group performance: "Under Pressure" by Queen/David Bowie

A summary of the groups' performances on the first live show, along with the results.
Group	Order	Song	Result
First Half
Nota	1	"I'm Yours" by Jason Mraz	Safe
Voices of Lee	2	"Unwritten" by Natasha Bedingfield	Last safe
Face	3	"Livin' on a Prayer" by Bon Jovi	Eliminated
Noteworthy	4	"Think" by Aretha Franklin	Safe
Second Half
Beelzebubs	5	"Magical Mystery Tour" by The Beatles	Safe
Maxx Factor	6	"Dancing Queen" by ABBA	Last safe
The SoCals	7	"Somebody To Love" by Queen	Safe
Solo	8	"Whatcha Say" by Jason Derülo	Eliminated
Swan songs
Face	1	"Home" by Daughtry	
Solo	2	"I Will Survive" by Gloria Gaynor	

=== Episode 2 (December 15, 2009) ===
- Theme: Big Hits (first song) and Guilty Pleasures (second song)

A summary of the groups' performances on the second live show, along with the results.
Group	Order	First song	Order	Second song	Result
Beelzebubs	1	"Right Round" by Flo Rida	7	"Come Sail Away" by Styx	Safe
Noteworthy	2	"Viva la Vida" by Coldplay	8	"Hold On" by Wilson Phillips	Eliminated
Voices of Lee	3	"No One" by Alicia Keys	9	"Freedom! '90" by George Michael	Safe
Nota	4	"Down" by Jay Sean	10	"Stayin' Alive" by the Bee Gees	Safe
The SoCals	5	"Already Gone" by Kelly Clarkson	11	"Nothing's Gonna Stop Us Now" by Starship	Safe
Maxx Factor	6	"Love Story" by Taylor Swift	12	"Rehab" by Amy Winehouse	Last safe
Swan song
Noteworthy	1	"Happy Ending" by Mika			

=== Episode 3 (December 16, 2009) ===
- Theme: Superstar Medleys (first round), Judges' Request (second round)
- Group performance: "Mr. Blue Sky" by Electric Light Orchestra

A summary of the groups' performances on the third live show, along with the results.
Group	Order	Song	Result
First Half
Nota	1	A medley of The Jackson 5: "I Want You Back", "I'll Be There" & "ABC"	Safe
Beelzebubs	2	A medley of The Who: "Behind Blue Eyes", "Who Are You", & "Baba O'Riley"	Safe
Maxx Factor	3	A medley of The Beach Boys: "God Only Knows", "Wouldn't It Be Nice" & "Good Vibrations"	Eliminated
The SoCals	4	A medley of Journey: "Any Way You Want It", "Open Arms" & "Don't Stop Believin'"	Last safe
Voices of Lee	5	A medley of The Beatles: "Paperback Writer", "Oh! Darling" & "All You Need is Love"	Safe
Second Half
Nota	6	"Sledgehammer" by Peter Gabriel	Safe
Beelzebubs	7	"Sweet Caroline" by Neil Diamond	Safe
The SoCals	8	"Hazy Shade of Winter" by Simon & Garfunkel	Eliminated
Voices of Lee	9	"Man in the Mirror" by Michael Jackson	Last safe
Swan songs
Maxx Factor	1	"Leaving on a Jet Plane" by John Denver	
The SoCals	2	"Here I Go Again" by Whitesnake	

=== Episode 4 (December 21, 2009) ===
- Group performance: "I Still Haven't Found What I'm Looking For" by U2
- Guest performance: Medley of Hits by Boyz II Men

A summary of the groups' performances on the final live show, along with the results.
Group	Order	First song	Order	Second song	Result
Voices of Lee	1	"Stand by Me" by Ben E. King	4	"Pocket Full of Sunshine" by Natasha Bedingfield (with Natasha Bedingfield)	Third Place
Beelzebubs	2	"Where is the Love?" by The Black Eyed Peas	5	"You Don't Own Me" by Lesley Gore (with Nicole Scherzinger)	Second Place
Nota	3	"Lean on Me" by Bill Withers	6	"The Tracks of My Tears" by The Miracles (with Smokey Robinson)	Winner
Nota, Beelzebubs, Voices of Lee	7	"Christmas (Baby Please Come Home)" by Darlene Love (with Nick Lachey)			
Nota, Beelzebubs, Voices of Lee	8	"Drive" by Bobby McFerrin (with Bobby McFerrin)			
Nota, Beelzebubs	9	"Why Can't We Be Friends?" by War (with Ben Folds)			
Swan songs
Voices of Lee	1	"So Long, Farewell" from The Sound of Music			Third Place
Beelzebubs	2	"We Gotta Get out of This Place" by The Animals			Second Place
Victory song
Nota	"Down" by Jay Sean (with Jay Sean)				Winner

== Ratings ==
Episode Number	Airdate	Rating/Share (18-49)	Viewers (millions)	Rank (Night)
1	December 14, 2009	2.3/6	6.9	2
2	December 15, 2009	2.6/7	6.9	2
3	December 16, 2009	2.2/6	6.5	3
4	December 21, 2009	2.3/7	7.2	2
