= Bubs Foundation =

US not-for-profit organization

- Founded: 1991
- Founder: Alumni of the Beelzebubs
- Type: Non-operating private foundation (IRS exemption status): 501(c)(3)
- Purpose: Music Education, Public Education
- Location: Boston, Massachusetts, United States
- Method: Grants, Funding
- Website: www.bubsfoundation.org

The Bubs Foundation, Inc. is a 501(c)(3), not-for-profit organization created by alumni of the Beelzebubs to "awaken in young people a passion for expression and learning through music". The foundation funds music programs in schools that previously have not had either sufficient funding or the opportunity to create strong music programs.

== Programs ==
As of 2008, the Bubs Foundation had donated over $50,000 in grants to 60 music programs in and around Boston and launched student a cappella groups in several Boston public middle and high schools.

=== Be The Music ===
Be The Music is a program, formed in 2002, that brings Tufts students and alums, as well as music students and teachers from outside the university, to area high schools to teach students how to sing in an a cappella style. An estimated 250 students have participated in Be The Music since its inception.

The Bubs Foundation has also created curriculum kits, using Be The Music as a model, in order to support other a cappella groups around the country in their efforts to create their own initiatives.

== See also ==
- Beelzebubs
