= Nota (group) =

Puerto Rican male a cappella group

NOTA
- Origin: San Juan, Puerto Rico
- Genres: A cappella, reggae, pop
- Years active: 1994–present
- Labels: Epic (2010-present); Sony (2010-present)
- Members: Johnny Figueroa; Jose A. Rodriguez; Ludwig Henderson; Edgar Rios; Juan E. Diaz; David Pinto
- Website: notavocal.com

Nota is an a cappella group of six male vocalists from San Juan, Puerto Rico. The group met in 1994 and started singing together occasionally. The group won the first season of the musical competition The Sing-Off.

== Biography ==
Johnny Figueroa, Nota's bass singer and a distinguished neuroscientist from Loma Linda University School of Medicine, first heard of The Sing-Off during the summer of 2009. He called five other people he had sung with on and off with for 15 years, seeking the five best singers for the competition. There was initially some doubt that Rodriguez and Rios would be able to participate: both had family members sick with the H1N1 virus, and David Pinto was unsure if he could participate in the competition, due to financial issues. Daddy Yankee, whom Pinto was working with, paid the airline bill in order for Pinto to participate in the competition. All five entered the competition, and won.

== The Sing-Off ==
Nota participated in the first season The Sing-Off, a singing competition broadcast on NBC where they competed against seven other vocal groups. Largely considered the underdog of the competition, Nota's popularity soared after performing "Down" by Jay Sean, on the second episode of the competition. In the final live broadcast on 21 December 2009, Nota won the contest against The Beelzebubs and Voices of Lee. After Nota won the competition, Jay Sean joined the group onstage to perform "Down". .

=== Performances and results ===
Episode	Theme	Song choice	Original artist	Result
1	Group's choice	"I'm Yours"	Jason Mraz	Advanced
2	Big Hits	"Down"	Jay Sean	Advanced
2	Guilty Pleasures	"Stayin' Alive"	The Bee Gees	Advanced
3	Superstar Medley	Various	Jackson 5	Advanced
3	Judge's choice	"Sledgehammer"	Peter Gabriel	Advanced
4	Finale	"Lean on Me"	Bill Withers	Advanced
4	Finale	"The Tracks of My Tears"	The Miracles	Winner

=== Post Sing Off ===
As winners of the competition, they received US$100,000 and a recording contract with Sony Music Entertainment. In 2010, Nota met with Sony Executives to plan a studio album. The album was recorded at Bill Hare Productions in Silicon Valley, California, Produced by Deke Sharon and Bill Hare.

== Career ==
=== Nota (2010-present) ===
They performed the Puerto Rico national anthem during the opening ceremony of the 2010 Central American and Caribbean Games held in Mayagüez, Puerto Rico. They also opened for Shakira on a few American dates of her The Sun Comes Out World Tour.

The group's debut album, Nota, was released on 1 November 2010. On 8 December 2010, the group returned to The Sing-Off and performed a cover of The Black Eyed Peas' "I Gotta Feeling," which is also featured on their debut album.

== Discography ==
=== Albums ===
Year	Album	Peak
Year	Album	US Heat
2010	Nota: Released: 1 November 2010; Label: Sony; Format: CD, digital download	8
2010	Nota's A Cappella Christmas: Released: 7 December 2010; Label: Sony; Format: Digital download	21
"—" denotes the album didn't chart.

=== Singles ===
Year	Single	Album
2010	"Down"	Nota
2010	"I Gotta Feeling"	Nota
2010	"All I Want for Christmas Is You"	Nota's A Cappella Christmas
2011	"My Girl"	Nota

=== Music videos ===
Year	Song	Album
2010	"All I Want for Christmas Is You"	Nota's A Cappella Christmas
2011	"My Girl"	Nota
