= Street Corner Symphony (group) =

American a cappella group

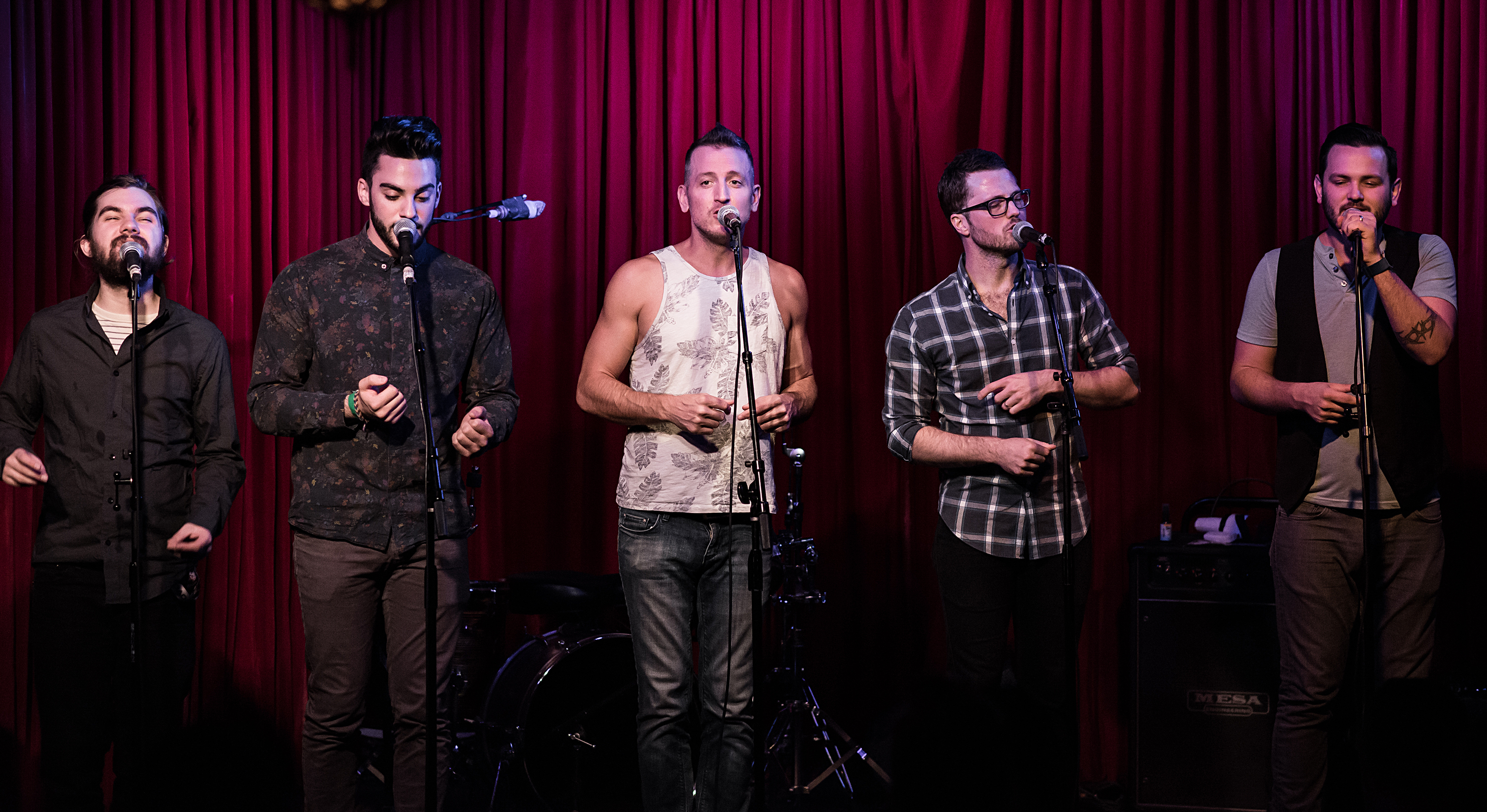
- Performing live in October 2016

Background information
- Origin: Nashville, Tennessee, United States
- Genres: A cappella
- Years active: 2010 – present
- Members: Armand Hutton; Jared Pruzan; Sean Murphy; Ian Simmons; Ronnie Robertson
- Past members: John Martin; Ben Dixon; Mark McLemore; Jon McLemore; Sean Saunders; Adam Chance; Richie Lister; Jeremy Lister; Jonathan Lister; Kaleb Jones; Kyle Hogan; Kurt Zimmerman; Maurice Staple; Manny Houston; Moiba Mustapha
- Website: http://streetcornersymphony.com

Street Corner Symphony is an a cappella group from Nashville, Tennessee and a contestant on the second season of NBC's reality show The Sing-Off. During The Sing-Off's season finale, Street Corner Symphony claimed the second place title, losing the championship to Huntsville, Alabama group Committed. It was formed in 2010 for the sole purpose of entering The Sing-Off. The members are from several of the Southeastern United States, including Tennessee, Alabama and Florida; the group is based out of Nashville.

== History ==
Street Corner Symphony was founded by Jon McLemore on May 28, 2010 to audition for the second season of the NBC show The Sing-Off. The group consisted of six members, including the Lister brothers, Ben Dixon, Sean Saunders and the McLemore brothers. Three weeks later, after passing the audition, Ben and Sean dropped out of the group, citing personal and work-related issues, leaving holes in high tenor and bass. This prompted Mark McLemore to approach two friends from his time in college, John Martin (Huntingdon College) and Adam Chance (The University of Alabama), to take their places. The group convened to meet the two over a weekend in June and successfully re-auditioned for the show.

In August 2011, John Martin took a sabbatical to complete a master's degree, and shortly thereafter Kurt Zimmerman (formerly of Eleventh Hour from The Sing-Off) began to fill in as a vocal percussionist. On March 4, 2013, Kurt announced his full-time membership in the group. Bass singer Adam Chance left the group in March 2016, to join Home Free. He was replaced temporarily by Elliott Robinson, and then permanently by Armand Hutton, a Grammy-nominated vocal bass formerly of Naturally 7. Lastly, Nashville artist Kaleb Jones (formerly from The Collective, another group that competed in The Sing-Off) joined the group.

== The Sing-Off ==
SCS were the runners-up on the second season of NBC's The Sing-Off, which aired for three weeks beginning December 6, 2010. The group has also been featured in several commercial advertisements for the show, which can be seen on YouTube.

== Discography ==
The band has released its own recordings through its own record label, UnPractice Records:

=== UnPractice Makes Perfect (2011) ===
1. "Hey, Soul Sister" (3:54)
2. "Holding On" (4:58)
3. "Plain Jane" (3:46)
4. "Drift Away" (3:17)
5. "Most of It" (3:10)
6. "Everything" (3:27)
7. "World to Me" (3:15)
8. "Mad World" (3:14)
9. "Down on the Corner" (2:36)
10. "Dead Man's Will" (2:56)

=== Southern Autumn Nostalgia (2013) ===
Their newest album, Southern Autumn Nostalgia, is composed of ten original songs written by group members Adam Chance, Jeremy Lister, Richie Lister, John Martin, and Mark McLemore. It was released on July 16, 2013, and features several guest artists from the worldwide a cappella community, including Pentatonix, The King's Singers, The Swingle Singers, Tim Storms, Andrea Figallo, Deke Sharon, and Voces8.

1. "Voodoo" (3:26)
2. "Emily" (3:46)
3. "Little Old Me" (3:42)
4. "Loves a Loser" (4:24)
5. "Southern Autumn Nostalgia" (4:21)
6. "Frozen in Time" (3:39)
7. "Picturing You" (3:25)
8. "Myriad of Stars" (4:24)
9. "Sicut tempus fugit" (1:21)
10. "Dragon Rider" (4:36)

=== A Street Corner Christmas (2016) ===
1. "I Heard the Bells on Christmas Day" (2:29)
2. "Rockin' Around the Christmas Tree" (2:07)
3. "Santa's Lost His Mojo" (2:44)
4. "This Christmas" (3:03)
5. "Rudolph the Red-Nosed Reindeer" (1:49)
6. "Happy Christmas (War is Over)" (3:21)
7. "White Christmas" (3:05)
8. "What Child Is This" (3:15)
9. "Silent Night" (4:14)

=== Singles ===
- July 4, 2012: "Star-Spangled Banner"
- March 26, 2013: "Hard to Handle"
- October 4, 2013: "Royals"
- September 23, 2014: "Madness"
- October 8, 2014: "We Are the Chaos Brothers" - As part of Made In Network's "Find the Beauty"

Featured on The Sing-Off releases

SCS has been featured on compilations in conjunction with The Sing-Off

- 2010: "Auld Lang Syne" (track #10 on The Sing Off - Harmonies For The Holidays)
- 2010: "Creep" (Track 4 on The Sing-Off Season 2 Finalists - The Studio Sessions EP)
