= The Sing-Off season 2 =

The Sing-Off
- Season 2
- Hosted by: Nick Lachey
- Judges: Ben Folds; Shawn Stockman; Nicole Scherzinger
- Winner: Committed
- Runner-up: Street Corner Symphony

Release
- Original network: NBC
- Original release: December 6 – December 21, 2010

Season chronology
- ← Previous; Season 1 Next → Season 3

The second season of The Sing-Off began on December 6, 2010. The number of a cappella groups was increased from eight to ten, with all acts coming from the United States. Nick Lachey remained as host and the three judges, Ben Folds, Shawn Stockman and Nicole Scherzinger, also returned. Deke Sharon returned as music director and vocal producer. The music staff included Ed Boyer, Ben Bram, and Bill Hare. The program was broadcast for five nights in December with the finale on December 20. The season premiere averaged 8.5 million viewers. On the finale, the group Committed became the second champion of the show, beating Street Corner Symphony, The Backbeats and Jerry Lawson & Talk of the Town.

This was Scherzinger's last season as a judge.

== Groups ==
Contestant	School	Finish	Number of members
Committed; Huntsville, Alabama	Oakwood University	Winner on December 20, 2010	6
Street Corner Symphony; Nashville, Tennessee	N/A	Second Place on December 20, 2010	6
The Backbeats; Los Angeles, California	UCLA/USC/BYU	Third Place on December 20, 2010	10
Jerry Lawson & Talk of the Town; Oakland, California	N/A	Eliminated 7th on December 20, 2010	6
On the Rocks; Eugene, Oregon	University of Oregon	Eliminated 6th on December 15, 2010	15
Groove for Thought; Seattle, Washington	N/A	Eliminated 5th on December 13, 2010	7
The Whiffenpoofs; New Haven, Connecticut	Yale University	Eliminated 4th on December 8, 2010	12
Eleventh Hour; Kettering, Ohio	Fairmont High School	Eliminated 3rd on December 8, 2010	7
Men of Note; Cherry Hill, New Jersey	Cherry Hill High School West Alumni	Eliminated 2nd on December 6, 2010	8
Pitch Slapped; Boston, Massachusetts	Berklee College of Music	Eliminated 1st on December 6, 2010	12

== Elimination table ==
Legend

Eliminated	Last safe	Safe	Third place	Second place	Winner

Date:		12/6	12/8	12/13	12/15 (A)	12/15 (B)	12/20
Place	Group	Result					
1	Committed	1st (B)	1st (B)	3rd	1st	1st	Winner
2	Street Corner Symphony	4th (B)	2nd (A)	2nd	4th	2nd	Second Place
3	The Backbeats	2nd (B)	3rd (B)	4th	2nd	3rd	Third Place
4	Jerry Lawson & Talk of the Town	1st (A)	1st (A)	1st	3rd	4th	Fourth Place
5	On the Rocks	3rd (A)	3rd (A)	5th	Eliminated		
6	Groove for Thought	4th (A)	2nd (B)	Eliminated			
7	The Whiffenpoofs	3rd (B)	Eliminated (B)				
8	Eleventh Hour	2nd (A)	Eliminated (A)				
9	Men of Note	Eliminated (B)					
10	Pitch Slapped	Eliminated (A)					

== Call-out order ==
Nick Lachey's call-out order
Order	1	2	3	4		5
1	Jerry Lawson & Talk of the Town	Jerry Lawson & Talk of the Town	Jerry Lawson & Talk of the Town	Committed	Committed	Committed
2	Eleventh Hour	Street Corner Symphony	Street Corner Symphony	The Backbeats	Street Corner Symphony	Street Corner Symphony
3	On the Rocks	On the Rocks	Committed	Jerry Lawson & Talk of the Town	The Backbeats	The Backbeats
4	Groove for Thought	Committed	The Backbeats	Street Corner Symphony	Jerry Lawson & Talk of the Town	Jerry Lawson & Talk of the Town
5	Committed	Groove for Thought	On the Rocks	On the Rocks		
6	The Backbeats	The Backbeats	Groove for Thought			
7	The Whiffenpoofs	The Whiffenpoofs				
8	Street Corner Symphony	Eleventh Hour				
9	Men of Note					
10	Pitch Slapped					

This group was eliminated.

- Unexpectedly, Committed, Street Corner Symphony, The Backbeats, and Jerry Lawson & Talk of the Town were all sent to the finale. In fact, this is the first and currently only Sing-Off season to have all four groups make it to the season finale.

== Performances ==
=== Episode 1 (December 6, 2010) ===
- Theme: Contestant's choice
- Group performance: "I've Got the Music in Me" by Kiki Dee

A summary of the groups' performances on the first live show, along with the results.
Group	Order	Song	Result
First half
Eleventh Hour	1	"Baby" by Justin Bieber	Safe
On the Rocks	2	"Bad Romance" by Lady Gaga	Safe
Groove for Thought	3	"I Wish" by Stevie Wonder	Last safe
Pitch Slapped	4	"Good Girls Go Bad" by Cobra Starship	Eliminated
Jerry Lawson & Talk of the Town	5	"Save the Last Dance for Me" by The Drifters	Safe
Second half
The Whiffenpoofs	6	"Grace Kelly" by Mika	Safe
Men of Note	7	"The Longest Time" by Billy Joel	Eliminated
Street Corner Symphony	8	"Everybody Wants to Rule the World" by Tears for Fears	Last safe
The Backbeats	9	"If I Were A Boy" by Beyoncé	Safe
Committed	10	"This Love" by Maroon 5	Safe
Swan songs
Pitch Slapped	1	"Na Na Hey Hey Kiss Him Goodbye" by Steam	
Men of Note	2	"Take a Bow" by Rihanna	

=== Episode 2 (December 8, 2010) ===
- Theme: Songs from the past five years
- Group performance: "Use Somebody" by Kings of Leon
- Guest performance: "I Gotta Feeling" by The Black Eyed Peas, performed by Nota

A summary of the groups' performances on the second live show, along with the results.
Group	Order	Song	Result
First half
On the Rocks	1	"Live Your Life" by T.I. and Rihanna	Last safe
Street Corner Symphony	2	"Hey Soul Sister" by Train	Safe
Eleventh Hour	3	"Just the Way You Are" by Bruno Mars	Eliminated
Jerry Lawson & Talk of the Town	4	"Mercy" by Duffy	Safe
Second half
The Backbeats	5	"Breakeven" by The Script	Last safe
Committed	6	"Apologize" by OneRepublic	Safe
Groove for Thought	7	"Cooler Than Me" by Mike Posner	Safe
The Whiffenpoofs	8	"Haven't Met You Yet" by Michael Bublé	Eliminated
Swan songs
Eleventh Hour	1	"Leavin'" by Jesse McCartney	
The Whiffenpoofs	2	"Home Sweet Home" by Mötley Crüe	

=== Episode 3 (December 13, 2010) ===
- Theme: Rock songs (first round), guilty pleasure songs (second round)
- Group performance: "21 Guns" by Green Day

A summary of the groups' performances on the third live show, along with the results.
Group	Order	First song	Order	Second song	Result
The Backbeats	1	"You Give Love a Bad Name" by Bon Jovi	7	"Love Shack" by B52s	Safe
Street Corner Symphony	2	"Creep" by Radiohead	8	"Come On Eileen" by Dexys Midnight Runners	Safe
Jerry Lawson & Talk of the Town	3	"(I Can't Get No) Satisfaction" by The Rolling Stones	9	"Easy" by The Commodores	Safe
On the Rocks	4	"Pour Some Sugar On Me" by Def Leppard	10	"Kyrie" by Mr. Mister	Last Safe
Groove for Thought	5	"Changes" by David Bowie	11	"You Make My Dreams" by Hall & Oates	Eliminated
Committed	6	"Every Breath You Take" by The Police	12	"I Want It That Way" by Backstreet Boys	Safe
Swan song
Groove for Thought	1	"That's Life" by Frank Sinatra			

=== Episode 4 (December 15, 2010) ===
- Theme: Medley of an iconic artist (first round), judges' choice (second round)
- Group performance: "With a Little Help from My Friends" by The Beatles

A summary of the groups' performances on the fourth live show, along with the results.
Group	Order	Song	Result
First half
On the Rocks	1	A medley of Elton John songs (The Bitch Is Back/Bennie and the Jets/Don't Let the Sun Go Down on Me)	Eliminated
Committed	2	A medley of Usher songs (DJ Got Us Fallin' in Love/U Got It Bad/Love in This Club)	Safe
Street Corner Symphony	3	A medley of The Beatles songs (Eleanor Rigby/Help!/Hey Jude)	Last Safe
The Backbeats	4	A medley of Lady Gaga songs (Poker Face/Paparazzi/Just Dance)	Safe
Jerry Lawson & Talk of the Town	5	A medley of Otis Redding songs ((Sittin' On) The Dock of the Bay/Try a Little Tenderness/Respect)	Safe
Second half
Committed	6	"Let's Stay Together" by Al Green	Advanced to the Finale
Street Corner Symphony	7	"Down on the Corner" by Creedence Clearwater Revival	Advanced to the Finale
The Backbeats	8	"Landslide" by Fleetwood Mac	Advanced to the Finale
Jerry Lawson & Talk of the Town	9	"House of the Rising Sun" by The Animals	Advanced to the Finale
Swan song
On the Rocks	1	"The Final Countdown" by Europe	

=== Episode 5: Finale (December 20, 2010) ===
- Group performances: "Put a Little Love in Your Heart" by Jackie DeShannon and "What Christmas Means to Me" by Stevie Wonder, with Nick Lachey

A summary of the groups' performances on the fifth live show, along with the results.
Group	Order	Song	Result
Committed	1	"Motownphilly" with Boyz II Men	Winner
The Backbeats	2	"King of Anything" with Sara Bareilles	Third Place
Jerry Lawson & Talk of the Town	3	"Ain't No Mountain High Enough" with Nicole Scherzinger	Fourth Place
Street Corner Symphony	4	"Gone" with Ben Folds	Second Place
The Backbeats Jerry Lawson & Talk of the Town	5	"Long Road Home" with Sheryl Crow	
Committed Street Corner Symphony	6	"Ain't No Sunshine" with Neil Diamond	
The Backbeats	7	"Firework" by Katy Perry	
Committed	8	"Hold My Hand" by Michael Jackson & Akon	
Jerry Lawson & Talk of the Town	9	"Love Train" by The O'Jays	
Street Corner Symphony	10	"Fix You" by Coldplay	
Swan songs
Jerry Lawson & Talk of the Town	1	"Hit the Road Jack" by Ray Charles	
The Backbeats	2	"Goodbye to You" by Scandal	
Street Corner Symphony	3	"Drift Away" by Dobie Gray	
Victory song
Committed	"We Are the Champions" by Queen		

== Ratings ==
Episode Number	Airdate	Rating	Share	Rating/share (18-49)	Viewers (millions)	Rank (time slot)	Rank (night)
1	December 6, 2010	5.1	8	2.8/7	8.57	2	6
2	December 8, 2010	4.5	7	2.7/7	7.64	1	6
3	December 13, 2010	5.3	8	3.3/9	9.51	2	6
4	December 15, 2010	5.0	8	2.9/8	8.45	2	4
5	December 20, 2010	TBA	TBA	2.7/7	8.61	1	2

== Post Sing-Off alumni ==
- The winning group, Committed, released their first album, Committed, which peaked at No. 171 on the US Billboard 200 chart, No. 31 on the Top R&B/Hip-Hop Albums chart and No. 3 on the Top Heatseekers chart.
- Pitch Slapped member Ingrid Andress began a solo country music career in 2019.

== Discography ==
The Sing-Off released two recordings of studio performances of participants.

=== The Sing Off: Harmonies For The Holidays (2010) ===
1. Pitch Slapped: "Joy to the World"
2. On the Rocks: "White Christmas"
3. The Backbeats: "O Holy Night"
4. Eleventh Hour: "Santa Claus is Comin' to Town"
5. Men of Note: "The First Noel"
6. The Whiffenpoofs: "God Rest Ye, Merry Gentlemen"
7. Committed: "Angels We Have Heard on High"
8. Jerry Lawson & Talk of the Town: "Silent Night"
9. Groove for Thought: "We Three Kings"/"O Come, O Come, Emmanuel"
10. Street Corner Symphony: "Auld Lang Syne"

=== The Sing-Off Season 2 Finalists: The Studio Sessions EP (2010) ===
1. Committed: "Apologize"
2. The Backbeats: "Landslide"
3. Jerry Lawson & Talk of the Town: "Mercy"
4. Street Corner Symphony: "Creep"
