= Techapella =

Showcase of a capella music hosted by members of tech companies in Silicon Valley

- Genre: A Cappella
- Location(s): Silicon Valley
- Years active: 2013-present
- Website: Techapella

Techapella is an annual showcase of a cappella music hosted by members of tech companies in Silicon Valley, California. The event was started in 2013 by Laolee Xiong and Aaron Roan, founders of Facebook's The Vocal Network and Google's Googapella, respectively.

The event has been emceed by a cappella personality and Sing-Off producer Deke Sharon, and is used as a fundraiser for local charities Music for Minors and the San Francisco Conservatory of Music.

Participating groups have included Googapella and Alphabeat (made up of Google employees), The Vocal Network (Facebook), The Pintunes (Pinterest), InTune (LinkedIn), Songbirds (Twitter), The Square Registers (Square), Syncopation (Dropbox), Airbnbeats (Airbnb), The Keynotes (Apple), The Chromotones (23andMe), and Scalesforce (Salesforce).
