= Beelzebubs =

Tufts University a cappella vocal group

Tufts Beelzebubs
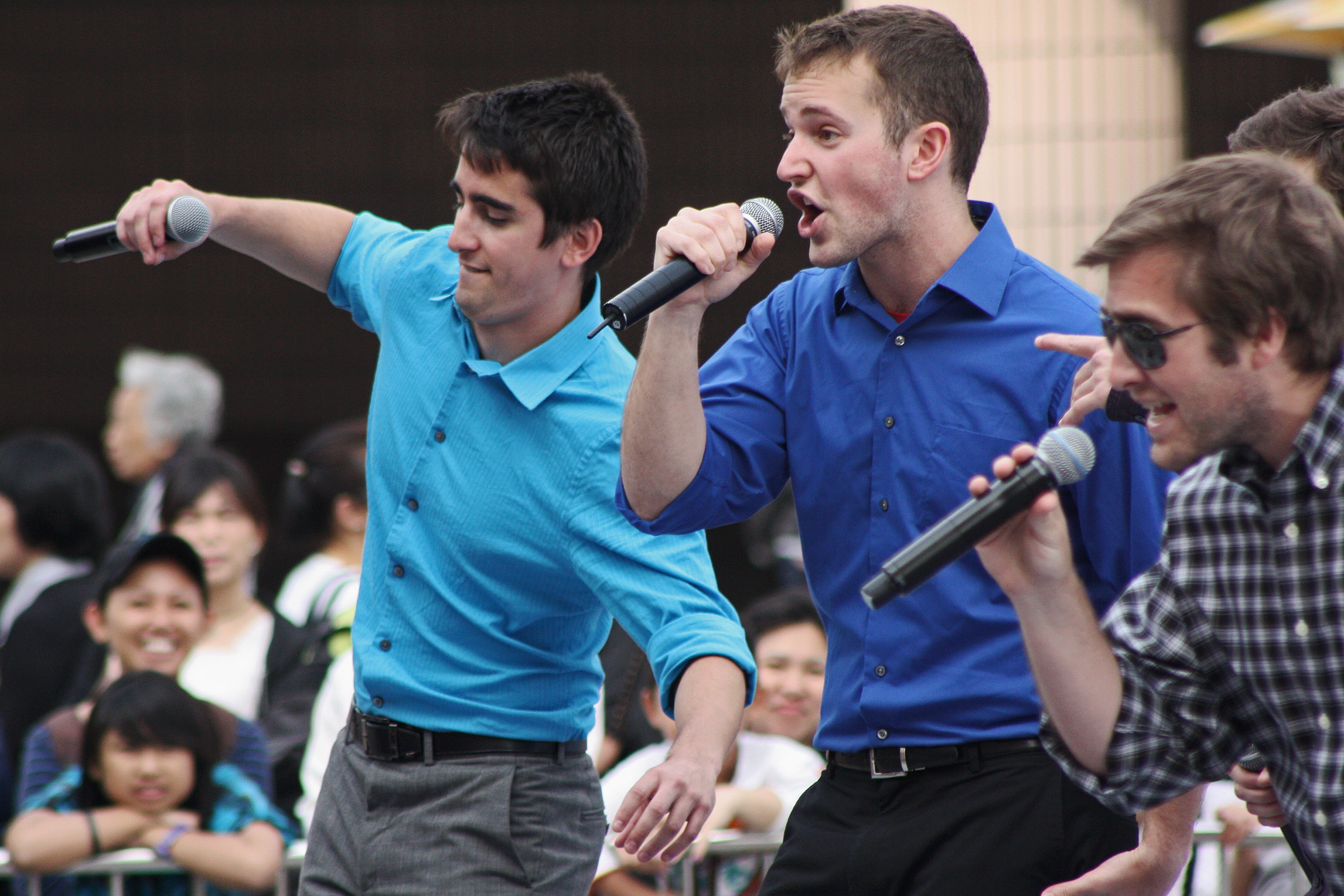
- The 2011-2012 Beelzebubs performing at the Hong Kong International A Cappella Festival 2012.

Background information
- Also known as: The Bubs
- Origin: Medford, Massachusetts, United States
- Genre: Collegiate a cappella
- Years active: 1962–present
- Label: Collegiate
- Members: Yash Chaddha; Griffen Collins; Danny Fencik; Peter Hitzeman; Dexer Koffel; Daren Lang; Nate Lawton; Daniel Lea; Ry Napurano; John Paszkiewicz; Alex Ramirez; Jacob Winston; Preston Yeh
- Website: Official website

The Tufts Beelzebubs, frequently referred to as "The Bubs", is a male a cappella group of students from Tufts University that performs a mix of pop, rock, R&B, and other types of music while spreading their motto of "Fun through Song". Founded in 1962, they have toured in Europe, Asia, South America, and North America, and they competed on NBC's The Sing-Off in December 2009, finishing in second place.

The group is best known for providing song arrangements and background vocals for the fictional all-male a cappella glee club "The Dalton Academy Warblers" on the American TV series Glee, although the Bubs do not play club members on screen. Singles by the Warblers, with series stars Darren Criss and Chris Colfer performing lead vocals, have collectively sold over 2 million copies. Due to their popularity, a full soundtrack album of the Warblers songs was released April 19, 2011 as Glee: The Music Presents the Warblers.

== History ==
The Beelzebubs were originally named "Jumbo's Disciples" after the Tufts University mascot, but quickly shed this name and adopted the name "Beelzebubs", a reference from the epic poem Paradise Lost by John Milton. They were first seen at the Tufts annual Winter Sing in December 1962, and by May 1964 they had already performed with the Boston Pops and recorded their first album.

During the 1970s, they began adding popular music to the barbershop, doo-wop, gospel, and jazz standards so commonly associated with a cappella. The group flourishes due to a successful and active alumni association.

The 1991 album Foster St. abandoned a more traditional methodology and introduced a new style of arranging – especially with the addition of vocal percussion In 2006, the Bubs' CD Shedding swept the CARA awards for collegiate male a cappella winning best collegiate album, best solo, best arrangement, and best song.

The Bubs' performance schedule has grown to over 80 gigs per year. The Bubs have toured in Europe (England, France, the Netherlands, Greece, and Turkey), Asia (Hong Kong, Taiwan, Japan, Thailand, and Singapore), South America (Argentina and Brazil), and North America (Mexico, Canada, and the United States including Hawaii and Alaska). They have performed for many high-profile personalities such as Presidents Clinton and Obama, Sen. Hillary Clinton, Jay Leno, and Gov. Bill Richardson. In 1999, the group made an appearance on the Late Show with David Letterman and performed at Fenway Park for the crowd at the Major League Baseball All-Star Game.

== The Sing-Off ==
The Beelzebubs were one of eight vocal groups featured on the NBC television program The Sing-Off, which aired in December 2009. The Bubs were selected amongst hundreds of groups to compete. Having survived cuts by the judges in each of the first three shows, the Beelzebubs appeared in the finals on December 21, 2009, finishing second to Nota from Puerto Rico. The competition's prize was $100,000 and a recording contract with Epic Records/Sony Music, and was determined by viewer voting.

According to The New York Times

The Beelzebubs ... used the superstar-medley round to spring a surprise. Their choice of superstars was The Who, but they did not begin their number with any of the obvious rockers from that group's repertory; instead they served up a slow, haunting "Behind Blue Eyes."

=== Performances and results ===
Episode/Theme	Song choice	Original artist	Result
Premiere	"Magical Mystery Tour"	The Beatles	Advanced
Big Hits	"Right Round"	Flo Rida	Advanced
Guilty Pleasures	"Come Sail Away"	Styx	Advanced
Superstar Medley	Various	The Who	Advanced
Judges' choice	"Sweet Caroline"	Neil Diamond	Runner-up

== The Bubs Foundation ==
The Beelzebubs are also proud of their continuing commitment to give back to the community through the Bubs Foundation. The Bubs Foundation, Inc. is a 501(c)(3), not-for-profit organization founded in 1991 by Beelzebubs alumni to "awaken in young people a passion for expression and learning through music". The organization consists of alumni and friends of the Beelzebubs dedicated to the Bubs Foundation mission to raise money for the music programs of Boston-area public schools. So far the Foundation has donated over $50,000 in grants to 60 area music programs.

== Glee ==
The Bubs provided arrangement and background vocals for ten a cappella covers in the second season of the TV series Glee, all of which were released as singles, starting with Katy Perry's "Teenage Dream", with lead vocals by Darren Criss, which aired in the episode "Never Been Kissed" on November 9, 2010. The single had sales of 214,000 copies in its first week, the most of any Glee single in the show's history, and reached number eight on the Billboard Hot 100; it has since been certified a gold record in the US. Additional covers include Train's "Hey, Soul Sister", Destiny's Child's "Bills, Bills, Bills", Robin Thicke's "When I Get You Alone", "Animal", P!nk's "Raise Your Glass", and Maroon 5's "Misery". The ten covers, plus two others recorded with the Bubs that did not appear on the show, were included on an album, Glee: The Music Presents the Warblers, which was released on April 19, 2011, and debuted at number two on the US Billboard 200, selling 86,000 copies in its first week. A thirteenth song on the album by the Warblers did not involve the Bubs: "Blackbird" by The Beatles was covered by Chris Colfer with other background vocalists. The last cover to air during the season was Keane's "Somewhere Only We Know", which was broadcast during the episode "Born This Way", which first aired on April 26, 2011, and is included on the Warblers album.

== Other Appearances ==
The Bubs were featured on the MTV show My Super Sweet 16.

One of the Bubs' previous releases (April 27, 2007) was their award-winning twenty-fifth studio album, titled Pandaemonium. Tracks from this album have been selected for Best of Collegiate A Cappella, Sing 4: Good Medicine, and Voices Only 2008. The album also received a perfect score from the Recorded A cappella Review Board. Like Shedding before it, Pandaemonium also won the four all-male categories of the Contemporary A Cappella Recording Award, including Best Album, Best Song, Best Solo and Best Arrangement. The Beelzebubs have received perfect scores from the Recorded A cappella Review Board on every release since.

They perform at many schools across the world and have even coached students at the schools, teaching them various singing methods.

With over 300 members around the world, The Beelzebubs celebrated their 55-year anniversary in 2018.

== Notable members ==
- Peter Gallagher, actor.
- Adam Gardner, musician in the alternative rock band Guster.
- Jean Mayer, honorary member, hunger activist and former President of Tufts University.
- Deke Sharon, founder of the Contemporary A Cappella Society and The House Jacks, arranger and vocal producer of Pitch Perfect
- Sam Mard, current member, leader and trailblazer, known widely for his 'Wonka Chocolate' TikTok.

== Awards ==
Year	Award	Category	Nominee(s)	Result	Ref.
2019	Contemporary A Cappella Recording Awards	Best Male Collegiate Album	Full Rally	Runner-up	
2019	Contemporary A Cappella Recording Awards	Best Rock Song	"Danger Zone" on Full Rally	Nominated	
2019	Contemporary A Cappella Recording Awards	Best Male Collegiate Arrangement	Joel Reske, "Danger Zone"	Nominated	
2019	Contemporary A Cappella Recording Awards	Best Male Collegiate Song	"T-Shirt" on Full Rally	Nominated	
2018	Contemporary A Cappella Recording Awards	Best Male Collegiate Song	"Who Do You Love" on Reboot - EP	Won	
2018	Contemporary A Cappella Recording Awards	Best Male Collegiate Arrangement	"24k Magic" on Reboot - EP	Nominated	
2018	Contemporary A Cappella Recording Awards	Best Pop Song	"24k Magic" on Reboot - EP	Nominated	
2016	Contemporary A Cappella Recording Awards	Best Male Collegiate Album	In the Book	Nominated	
2014	Contemporary A Cappella Recording Awards	Best All-Male Collegiate Album	Helix	Won	
2014	Contemporary A Cappella Recording Awards	Best Soul/R&B/Hip-Hop Song	"Alright" on Helix	Nominated	
2014	Contemporary A Cappella Recording Awards	Best Male Collegiate Song	"Alright" on Helix	Nominated	
2014	Contemporary A Cappella Recording Awards	Best Male Collegiate Solo	Adam Gotbaum, "Madness"	Nominated	
2014	Contemporary A Cappella Recording Awards	Best Male Collegiate Arrangement	Michael Grant, "Alright"	Nominated	
2012	Contemporary A Cappella Recording Awards	Best All-Male Collegiate Album	"Battle"	Won	
2012	Contemporary A Cappella Recording Awards	Best All-Male Collegiate song	"Kings and Queens"	Won	
2012	Contemporary A Cappella Recording Awards	Best All-Male Collegiate arrangement	Alexander Koutzoukis, "Kings and Queens"	Runner-up (tie)	
2010	Contemporary A Cappella Recording Awards	Best All-Male Collegiate Album	"Play the Game"	Won	
2010	Contemporary A Cappella Recording Awards	Best All-Male Collegiate arrangement	Alexander Koutzoukis, "All the Love in the World"	Won	
2010	Contemporary A Cappella Recording Awards	Best All-Male Collegiate song	"Who Are You"	Won	
2010	A Cappella Community Awards	Favorite Male Collegiate Group	Themselves	Won	
2010	A Cappella Community Awards	Favorite Collegiate Album	"Play the Game"	Won	
2010	A Cappella Community Awards	Favorite Vocal Percussionist	Alexander Koutzoukis	Runner-up	
2010	A Cappella Community Awards	Favorite Medley	"The Who Medley"	Runner-up	
2008	Contemporary A Cappella Recording Awards	Best All-Male Collegiate Album	"Pandaemonium"	Won	
2008	Contemporary A Cappella Recording Awards	Best All-Male Collegiate arrangement	Ed Boyer, "Digging in the Dirt"	Won	
2008	Contemporary A Cappella Recording Awards	Best All-Male Collegiate song	"Magical Mystery Tour"	Won (tie)	
2008	Contemporary A Cappella Recording Awards	Best All-Male Collegiate Soloist	Andrew Savini, "When I Get You Alone"	Won	
2006	Contemporary A Cappella Recording Awards	Best All-Male Collegiate Album	"Shedding"	Won	
2006	Contemporary A Cappella Recording Awards	Best All-Male Collegiate arrangement	Travis Marshall, "Everybody Wants to Rule the World"	Won	
2006	Contemporary A Cappella Recording Awards	Best All-Male Collegiate song	"Let's Get It Started"	Won	
2006	Contemporary A Cappella Recording Awards	Best All-Male Collegiate Soloist	Andrew Savini, "Epiphany"	Won	
2006	A Cappella Community Awards	Favorite Male Group in the Nation	Themselves	Won	
2005	A Cappella Community Awards	Favorite Male Group in the Nation	Themselves	Won	
2004	Contemporary A Cappella Recording Awards	Best All-Male Collegiate Album	"Code Red"	Runner-up	
2004	Contemporary A Cappella Recording Awards	Best All-Male Collegiate arrangement	Ed Boyer, "Hot in Here"	Runner-up	
2004	Contemporary A Cappella Recording Awards	Best All-Male Collegiate song	"Take Me Home"	Nominated	
2002	Contemporary A Cappella Recording Awards	Best All-Male Collegiate Album	"Next"	Runner-up	
2002	Contemporary A Cappella Recording Awards	Best All-Male Collegiate arrangement	Ed Boyer, "Bills, Bills, Bills"	Won	
2002	Contemporary A Cappella Recording Awards	Best All-Male Collegiate Soloist	Isaac Brody, "Disco Inferno"	Nominated	
2000	Contemporary A Cappella Recording Awards	Best All-Male Collegiate Album	"Infinity"	Won	
2000	Contemporary A Cappella Recording Awards	Best All-Male Collegiate song	"That's the Way"	Won	
1998	Contemporary A Cappella Recording Awards	Best All-Male Collegiate arrangement	Danny Lichtenfield, "I am the Walrus"	Nominated	
1998	Contemporary A Cappella Recording Awards	Best All-Male Collegiate song	"Sledgehammer" from Id	Won	
1997	Contemporary A Cappella Recording Awards	Best All-Male Collegiate arrangement	Todd Herzog, "Shape of my Heart" from Drift	Runner-up	
1997	Contemporary A Cappella Recording Awards	Best All-Male Collegiate song	"With or Without You"	Runner-up	
1996	Contemporary A Cappella Recording Awards	Best All-Male Collegiate Album	"Gilding"	Won	
1996	Contemporary A Cappella Recording Awards	Best All-Male Collegiate arrangement	Danny Lichtenfield "Blood of Eden"	Won	
1995	Contemporary A Cappella Recording Awards	Best All-Male Collegiate arrangement	Todd Herzog, "Hey You"	Won	
1995	Contemporary A Cappella Recording Awards	Best All-Male Collegiate song	"Hey You"	Runner-up	
1995	Contemporary A Cappella Recording Awards	Best All-Male Collegiate Soloist	Matt Trowbridge, "The Water is Wide"	Runner-up	
1994	Contemporary A Cappella Recording Awards	Best All-Male Collegiate Album	"Vince"	Won	
1994	Contemporary A Cappella Recording Awards	Best All-Male Collegiate arrangement	Gardner & Herzog, "Sympathy for the Devil"	Runner-up	
1994	Contemporary A Cappella Recording Awards	Best All-Male Collegiate song	"Mercy Street"	Won	
1994	Contemporary A Cappella Recording Awards	Best All-Male Collegiate Soloist	Todd Herzog	Won	
1992 (Note: Prior to 1992, there were no awards organizations related to a cappella. 1992 was the first year the Contemporary A Cappella Society announced Recording Awards, after the society's founding in 1991.)	Contemporary A Cappella Recording Awards	Best All-Male Collegiate Album	"Foster Street"	Won	
1992	Contemporary A Cappella Recording Awards	Best All-Male Collegiate arrangement	Deke Sharon, "Comfortably Numb/Brain Damage"	Won	
1992	Contemporary A Cappella Recording Awards	Best All-Male Collegiate song	"Rio"	Won	
1992	Contemporary A Cappella Recording Awards	Best All-Male Collegiate Soloist	Todd Herzog	Won	

== Discography ==
Album	Year
Brothers in Song	1964
Sing On	1965
Signin' In	1966
Something Old, Something New	1968
The White Album	1972
The Blue Album	1974
Ballou Hall	1977
Pub	1979
Therapy	1981
Score	1983
Clue	1985
Lost	1987
Fourteen	1989
BWI I	1990
Foster Street	1991
BWI II	1992
Vince	1993
House	1994
Gilding	1995
Drift	1996
Id	1997
Jade	1998
Infinity	1999
Next	2001
Punch	2002
Code Red	2003
Shedding	2005
Pandæmonium	2007
Play The Game	2009
Glee: The Music Presents the Warblers	2011
BATTLE	2011
Helix	2013
Four Seconds - EP	2014
In The Book	2015
Reboot - EP	2017
Full Rally	2018
Prospect Street	2021
Prevail	2022
Delirium	2024
School's Out - EP	2025
