= The Sing-Off =

American television singing competition

- Genre: Reality television
- Presented by: Nick Lachey
- Judges: Ben Folds; Shawn Stockman; Nicole Scherzinger; Sara Bareilles; Jewel; Patrick Stump
- Theme music composer: Dylan Berry; Mike Geier
- Composers: Dylan Berry; Mike Geier; The House Jacks
- Country of origin: United States
- Original language: English
- No. of seasons: 5
- No. of episodes: 28

Production
- Executive producers: Joel Gallen; Sam Weisman; Deborah Jelin Newmyer; Mark Burnett
- Producers: Deke Sharon; Deondray Gossett; Quincy LeNear
- Production companies: Tenth Planet Productions; Outlaw Productions; Sony Pictures Television; One Three Media (s. 4); United Artists Media Group (s. 5)

Original release
- Network: NBC
- Release: December 14, 2009 – December 17, 2014

The Sing-Off is an American television singing competition featuring a cappella groups. It debuted on NBC on December 14, 2009, and was produced by Sony Pictures Television and Outlaw Productions, with Mark Burnett's One Three Media (for a time called United Artists Media Group) being added for the fourth season. A fifth season aired as a holiday special in December 2014.

== Summary ==
It was hosted by Nick Lachey (from the boy band 98 Degrees), with judges Ben Folds, Shawn Stockman (of the rhythm-and-blues vocal group Boyz II Men), and originally Nicole Scherzinger, later replaced by Sara Bareilles. Bareilles left the show after the third season and was replaced by Jewel for the fourth season. Several members of the show's music staff have come from the a cappella community, including Deke Sharon (music director/vocal producer), Bill Hare, Ed Boyer, Ben Bram, Robert Dietz, Christopher Diaz, and Nick Girard.

A cappella groups from the United States, including Puerto Rico, were chosen by audition and advanced in the competition based on judges' eliminations. Before the fourth season, the winners of the competition were determined by viewer votes during the finale.

The program has featured guest appearances by various popular artists, including Bobby McFerrin, Natasha Bedingfield, Jay Sean, Smokey Robinson, Neil Diamond, Boyz II Men, Flo Rida and Sara Bareilles.

The Sing-Off was renewed for a third season and started to air much earlier on September 19, 2011, though the first two seasons had been broadcast in December. Unlike previous seasons, the early start in September allowed for the production of more episodes and the number of participant groups increased.

The Puerto Rican group Nota won the title for the inaugural season in 2009. For season 2, Committed from Huntsville, Alabama, took the 2010 title, and for season 3, Pentatonix from Arlington, Texas, won the 2011 title. The country group Home Free from Minneapolis, Minnesota, won the 2013 title for season 4.

On May 13, 2012, The Sing-Off was not renewed for another season, presumably cancelled after three seasons. However, on March 13, 2013, almost a year after the show was not renewed, NBC announced that The Sing-Off would return for a fourth season.

On December 17, 2014, NBC aired a special two-hour episode of The Sing-Off, billed as "Season 5" of the show. The special was filmed at the Dolby Theatre in Los Angeles and featured six competing groups, with the Vanderbilt Melodores being crowned the champions.

== Series overview ==
Season	Winner	Runner-up	Third	Episodes	First airdate	Last airdate
1	Nota	Beelzebubs	Voices of Lee	4	December 14, 2009	December 21, 2009
2	Committed	Street Corner Symphony	The Backbeats	5	December 6, 2010	December 20, 2010
3	Pentatonix	The Dartmouth Aires	Urban Method	11	September 19, 2011	November 28, 2011
4	Home Free	Ten	Vocal Rush	7	December 9, 2013	December 23, 2013
5	Vanderbilt Melodores	The Exchange	Traces	1	December 17, 2014	

=== Season 1 (2009) ===
The show featured eight a cappella groups performing popular songs live. The winner's prize was $100,000 and a Sony Music recording contract.

The first episode saw all groups perform their signature song. The second episode saw the remaining six groups perform two songs: in the first half of the show, each group performed one big hit from recent years; and in the second half, each group sang one "guilty pleasure" song. The third episode had the five remaining groups perform a medley from a classic artist. In the second part of the show, the four remaining groups performed songs that the judges picked specifically to showcase each group's strengths.

At the end of the third show, viewers were asked to call or text to vote for one of the remaining groups, Voices of Lee, The Beelzebubs, and Nota. The group with the most votes was revealed in the finale, and in the end Voices of Lee was revealed to come in third place halfway through the finale, with Nota being declared winners.

=== Season 2 (2010) ===
In the second season, the show returned on December 6, 2010, for five episodes, with the number of groups increased from eight to ten. Nick Lachey returned as host for the second season, as well as the three judges Ben Folds, Shawn Stockman and Nicole Scherzinger.

The first episode had the groups sing their signature songs. In the second episode, the remaining eight groups sang a modern song that was released in the past five years. For the third episode, the groups covered a rock song and a "guilty pleasure" piece. The fourth episode was to sing a medley of songs by a noteworthy artist and perform a song chosen by the judges. One more group was supposed to be eliminated, but the judges chose to put Jerry Lawson and The Talk of the Town, The Backbeats, Street Corner Symphony, and Committed all through to the finale. This is the only season to have four groups in the finale.

At the finale, Jerry Lawson and The Talk of the Town was the first to be eliminated. The Backbeats came in third place, Street Corner Symphony came in second, and Committed won the title.

=== Season 3 (2011) ===
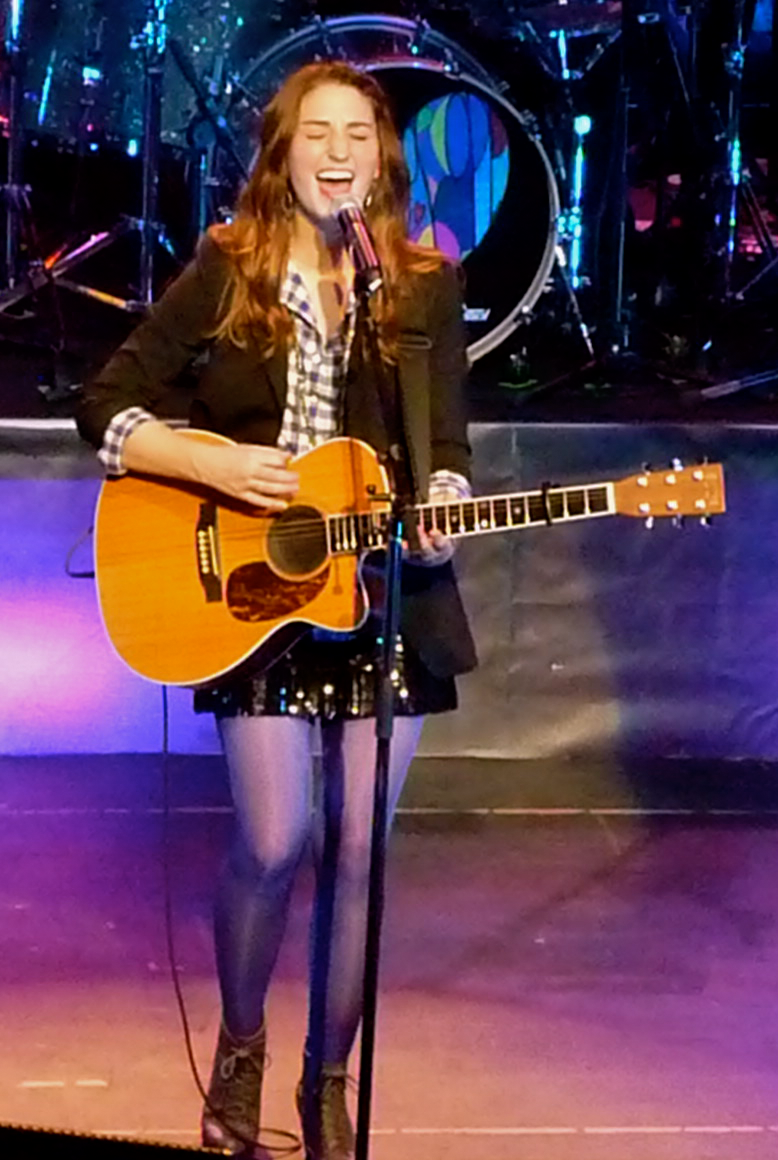
Sara Bareilles was a new judge for the third season, replacing Nicole Scherzinger

The Sing-Off was renewed for a third season of eleven episodes and premiered on September 19, 2011. This was the first Sing-Off season to include sixteen groups of a cappella singers. On May 16, 2011, it was announced that judge Nicole Scherzinger would not return for this season due to her commitment duties as one of the judges of The X Factor, and that Sara Bareilles would replace Scherzinger on the judging panel. Nick Lachey, Ben Folds, and Shawn Stockman all returned.

Since there were sixteen vocal groups, the groups were divided into two brackets of eight for the first four episodes to get down to the top ten. The first and second episodes had the groups sing their signature songs, while the third and fourth episodes had the groups perform a current hit and a classic from the 1960s. The fifth episode saw the two brackets merge, with the remaining ten groups performing their guilty pleasure songs. In the sixth episode, the eight remaining groups performed a hip-hop song and at the end of the episode, the show had its first-ever Sing-Off showdown, in which bottom two groups sang different versions of a song and the judges voted which to send home. The remaining groups in the seventh episode sang a superstar medley and in the eighth episode, the remaining six performed a country song and a rock-and-roll song. The top five groups performed rhythm-and-blues hits from today, and classics from the past, in the ninth episode. In the tenth episode, the top four performed master mix songs, a song picked by the judges. In the elimination, Urban Method and Pentatonix advanced to the finale. The judges could not come to a decision on the remaining two groups, Afro-Blue and the Dartmouth Aires, so they performed their favorite songs from past performances. In a two-to-one decision by the judges, Afro-Blue was voted off and the Dartmouth Aires advanced to the finale. The live finale crowned Pentatonix as winners, with the Dartmouth Aires coming in second, and Urban Method coming in third place.

One week after the third season ended, a Christmas special (titled "The Sing-Off Christmas") was aired on December 5, 2011. It featured groups from all three seasons singing various Christmas songs.

=== Season 4 (2013) ===
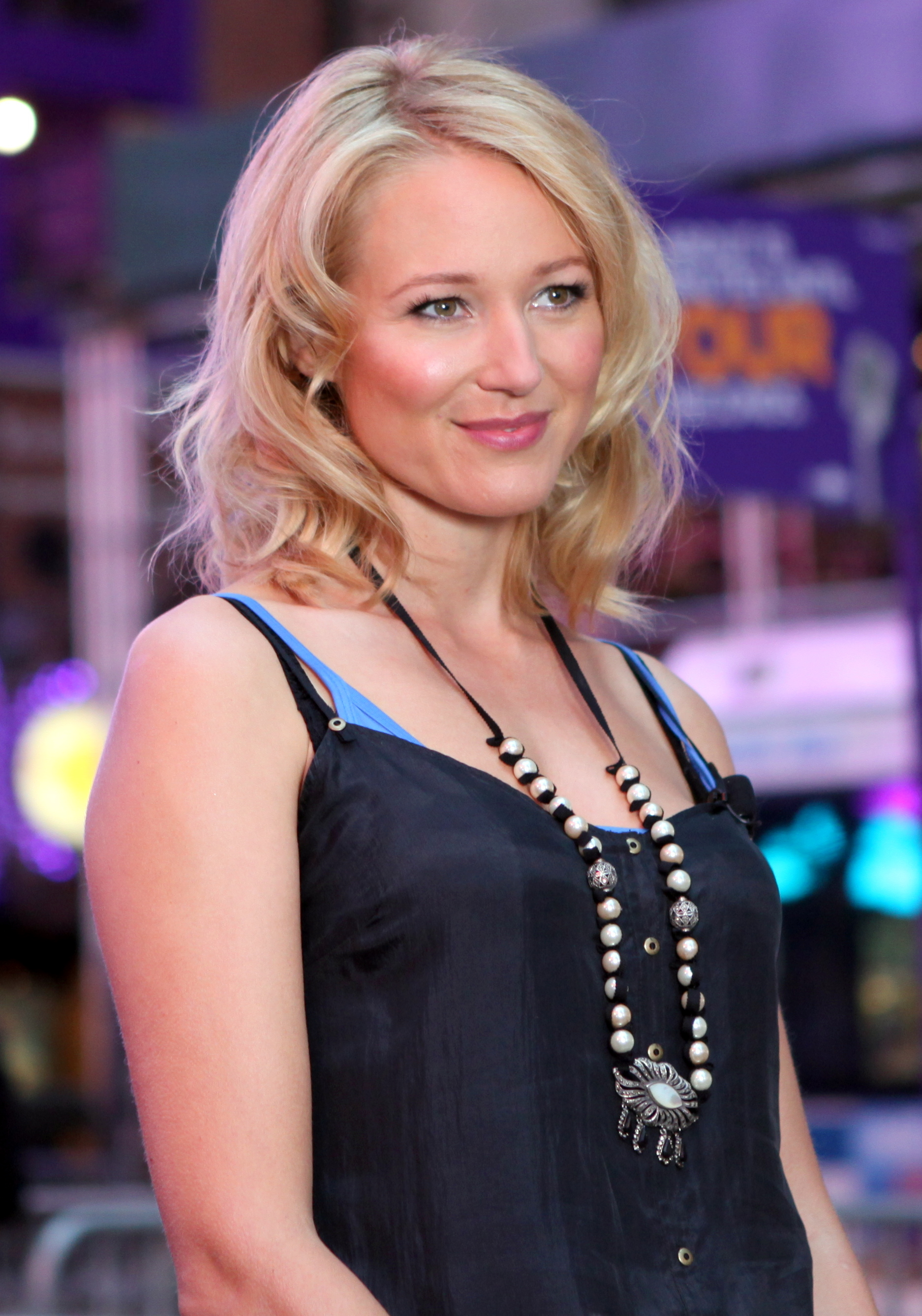
Jewel was the new judge for the fourth season, replacing Sara Bareilles

On March 13, 2013, NBC announced that The Sing-Off would return for a fourth season, with additional production by Mark Burnett's One Three Media, which also produces NBC's other singing competition show, The Voice. After the fourth season was announced, Sara Bareilles announced that she would not be returning to the show. On July 2, 2013, it was announced that Jewel would replace Bareilles as a judge.

As a new addition to the season, at the end of every show, the bottom two groups decided by the judges faced off in an "Ultimate Sing-Off", with each group singing the same song trying to eliminate their opponent. The show returned on December 9, 2013, and aired over several nights, concluding on December 23, 2013. In a first for The Sing-Off, groups from the show will go on tour, with 32 shows scheduled in 32 cities during February and March 2014.

Home Free was crowned the winner, with Ten coming in second and Vocal Rush coming in third.

=== Season 5 (2014) ===
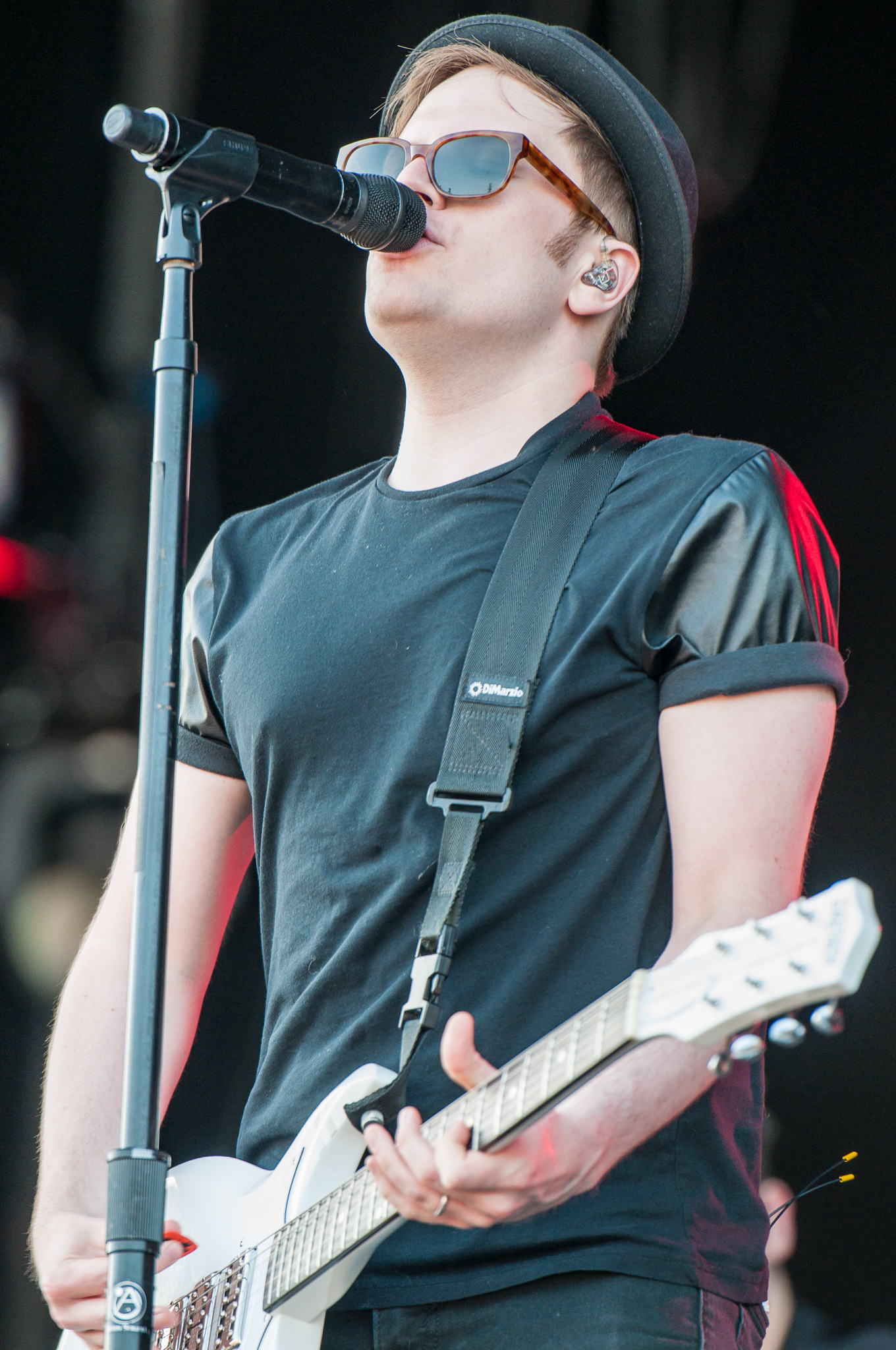
Patrick Stump was the new judge for the fifth season, replacing Ben Folds

On October 1, 2014, NBC renewed the series for a fifth season to air at the end of 2014. Although a "season" of shows did not air (to the confusion of some fans), NBC aired a two-hour special on December 17, 2014. Lachey, Stockman and Jewel returned with Patrick Stump replacing Folds, and Deke Sharon returned as music director/vocal producer.

At the end of the night, the Vanderbilt Melodores were crowned as the new champions, The Exchange were the runners-up, and Traces placed third. The other competitors on Season 5 were a.squared, San Fran 6, and Timothy's Gift.

Season 5 marked the first and only time that a competing group on the show was permitted to use electronics to supplement their live vocal sound (as demonstrated by a.squared's performance of "Pompeii" by Bastille). This use of electronic effects had been previously banned, most notably in the case of season 3 contestants Arora (formerly Sonos) who were not allowed to perform with their signature effects pedals.

The special received 5.10 million viewers, a 1.3 rating, and a 4 share.

==== Performances ====
- Group Performance: "Kids in America" by Kim Wilde
- Pentatonix (season 3 winners) performed Christmas Holiday Medley of "Hark! The Herald Angels Sing", "Santa Claus Is Comin' to Town", and "That's Christmas to Me".

===== First round =====
- Theme: Contestants' choice

Group	Order	Song	Result
Timothy’s Gift	1	"Ghost" by Ella Henderson	Eliminated
a.squared	2	"Pompeii" by Bastille	Eliminated
Traces	3	"River Deep, Mountain High" by Tina Turner	Advanced
The Exchange	4	"Love Runs Out" by OneRepublic	Advanced
SanFran6	5	"Break Free" by Ariana Grande feat. Zedd	Eliminated
Vanderbilt Melodores	6	"Trumpets" by Jason Derulo	Advanced

===== Second round =====
- Theme: Judges' choice

Group	Order	Song	Result
Traces	1	"I'm Every Woman" by Chaka Khan	Third Place
The Exchange	2	"Sing" by Ed Sheeran	Second Place
Vanderbilt Melodores	3	"Take Me to Church" by Hozier	Winner

== International broadcasts ==
The Sing-Off format has also been adapted in South Africa, France, the Netherlands, and China.
