= Contemporary A Cappella Society =

Charitable organization

- Contemporary A Cappella Society of America
- Abbreviation: CASA
- Formation: October 1990; 35 years ago
- Founder: Deke Sharon
- Founded at: Tufts University, Medford, Massachusetts, United States
- Type: 501(c)(3)
- Registration no.: 94-3162877
- Chief of Staff: Anthony Pulido
- Website: casa.org

The Contemporary A Cappella Society (of America), or CASA, is a 501(c)(3) charitable organization that fosters and promotes a cappella music of all styles around the world. CASA was founded in October 1990 by Deke Sharon while attending Tufts University in Medford. Sharon published a newsletter, the Collegiate A Cappella Newsletter (later renamed to the Contemporary A Cappella Newsletter), which was mailed to a database of collegiate a cappella groups maintained by his own college a cappella group, the Beelzebubs. The Contemporary A Cappella Recording Awards (CARAs) were established the following year in 1992.

The organization is the host of several annual events including the International Championship of Collegiate A Cappella. It boasts over 6,000 current members and serves as a resource for media and scholarly work in the area of contemporary a cappella.

== History ==
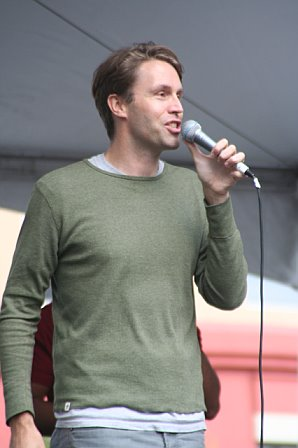
Deke Sharon in 2006

The Contemporary A Cappella Society (CASA) was founded in October 1990 by Deke Sharon in his dorm room at Tufts University. Sharon was part of the Tufts Beelzebubs in his senior year, and he decided to arrange a version of In Your Eyes by Peter Gabriel for eleven parts instead of the typical four or five parts. Sharon had trouble making the vowels and syllables from the original song work in a traditional a cappella piece, so he decided to view his arrangement more like an orchestral score. He had some members of his group make percussive noises imitating synthesizers, drums, and shakers while the other members sang his modified version of In Your Eyes. His group was apprehensive about the new style at first, but they performed the arrangement that weekend and received extremely positive feedback; the album they released the song on, Foster Street, sold over 5,000 copies in the first two months and garnered attention across the east coast. After seeing how much the audience loved this new a cappella style he created, Sharon decided to go even further with his idea and founded CASA. Its creation is marked with the publication of the Collegiate A Cappella Newsletter (later renamed to the Contemporary A Cappella Newsletter) which aimed to spread information about a cappella music. Since its creation, CASA has expanded by establishing more events and programs dedicated to connecting more people to the world of a cappella.

In 1992, CASA launched the Contemporary A Cappella Recording Awards (CARAs) to honor outstanding achievements in recorded a cappella music each year. The first ceremony included twenty categories: nine for professional groups and eleven for scholastic groups. In 1993, the Ambassador Program was created which allowed volunteers to manage and share information about a cappella events in their local communities through CASA. Two years later, CASA released with Adam Farb the first annual Best of Collegiate A Cappella (BOCA) album containing their choice of the best recorded a cappella music from the year.

By 1996, CASA launched its first festival, the East Coast A Cappella Summit, and the National Championship of College A Cappella (NCCA). The competition was originally held at Lincoln Center in New York City and was later renamed to the International Championship of Collegiate A Cappella in 2001. The championship was later expanded to western Europe in 2006. In 2003, CASA began the Tunes To Teens program which sent a cappella CDs to grade school students in hopes to sparking interest in the genre. Two years later, in 2005, the CASAcademy web portal was created which served to provide information about a cappella music around the world.

A major shift took place in 2009 when CASA merged with the Alliance for A Cappella Initiatives, run by Dave Sperandio. This created the SoJam A Cappella Festival, CASA's currently longest-running festival. Shortly afterward, the Los Angeles A Cappella Festival (LAAF) was also merged into CASA, and in 2012, the Boston Sings Festival (BOSS) was created. These three festivals—SoJam, held every fall; LAAF, held every winter; and BOSS, held every spring—are the current three events that still run each year.

The award ceremony for the CARAs were moved to be held during the BOSS Festival, and in 2017, CASA established the A Cappella Video Awards (AVA) which are held during the LAAF Festival.

== Awards ==
=== Contemporary A Cappella Recording Awards ===
Since 1992, the annual Contemporary A Cappella Recording Awards (a.k.a. "CARAs") have recognized recorded a cappella music. The awards are intended to recognize achievements in contemporary a cappella recording. Eligible a cappella recordings released during each year are considered for the awards.

The CARA mission reflects that of its parent organization, the Contemporary A Cappella Society (CASA) : an aim to reward artists that create outstanding work and to promote innovation, creativity, and continued growth of the a cappella modality. Furthermore, the awards aim to foster the a cappella community by having its best and brightest participate in the CARA nomination and judging process. Finally, CASA uses the application process as a means to provide resources to charitable programs such as Tunes to Teens (free a cappella recordings for students).

=== A Cappella Video Awards ===
The annual A cappella Video Awards (AVA) aim is to recognize the best of a cappella video. The AVA mission reflects that of its parent organization, the Contemporary A Cappella Society (CASA), to reward artists that create outstanding work and to promote innovation, creativity, and continued growth of the a cappella medium.

=== A Cappella Community Awards ===
The "A Cappella Community Awards" (a.k.a. the "ACAs") are voted on annually by registered users of CASA.org to allow fans the chance to award their favorite a cappella groups. Often called the "People's Choice Awards of the A Cappella community", the ACAs aim to further award excellent groups and individuals in the a cappella community, including non-American groups, by giving fans a venue to reward their favorite groups.

== Educational programs ==
CASA produces weekend-long educational festivals open to the general public several times a year around the US, including the Los Angeles A Cappella Festival ("LAAF") in February, the Boston A Cappella Festival ("BOSS") in April, and the Southern A Cappella Festival ("SoJam"). Past festivals have been held in San Francisco, New York, Philadelphia, and Chicago.

=== CASAcademy ===
CASAcademy is a web portal through which CASA members can learn more about a cappella, hear selected music samples, view performance videos, read about forming and managing groups, and read about various a cappella-related topics (vocal health, etc.).

=== Acapedia 2.0 ===
The CASA Acapedia is a large database of a cappella groups, solo artists, beatboxers, studios, producers and more. The Acapedia is free and editable by any registered CASA member. It includes information on former groups, as well as current ones. The database is configured as a wiki, wherein any user can add and modify information. All changes are tracked and can be un-done in the event of error or vandalism. The Acapedia currently features over 2400 profiles.

Each Acapedia profile is designed to include group information such as school or affiliation, current roster of members, concert listings, history, recording information, and tour dates.

== Volunteer and outreach programs ==
=== Ambassador Program ===
The Ambassador Program aims to unite singers and groups across the U.S. and world via an organized networking system. CASA Ambassadors are individuals responsible for involvement in their own a cappella communities – gathering information about groups, events, auditions, a cappella friendly clubs, singers, technology, opportunities and anything else that touches on a cappella. They upload that information to CASA.org via the Acapedia so it can be shared with the entire community.

Ambassadors also keep abreast of a cappella happenings globally via CASA.org and share that information with their respective communities while encouraging them to become CASA members, to sing in Contemporary A Cappella League groups, to attend CASA festivals, and to support the vocal arts.

Ambassadors serve a one-year volunteer term and are offered a number of incentives which have included free memberships to CASA.org, free copies of CASA-sponsored compilation albums, and free tickets to CASA-sponsored festivals such as SoJam.

=== Tunes To Teens ===
Tunes To Teens (TTT) gives donated a cappella CDs to junior high and high school chorus students. The program's goal is to spark interest in a cappella music in up-and-coming singers, and to help directors to teach their students the basics of music theory. Since 2003, more than 2000 students in 23 US states and Canada have received CDs from TTT.

A Cappella Radio International was aired on over 50 stations worldwide from 1996 to 2004.

CASA establishes contemporary a cappella choruses across the United States, having done so from the San Francisco Bay Area to Maryland.
