= Evynne Hollens =

American female vocalist

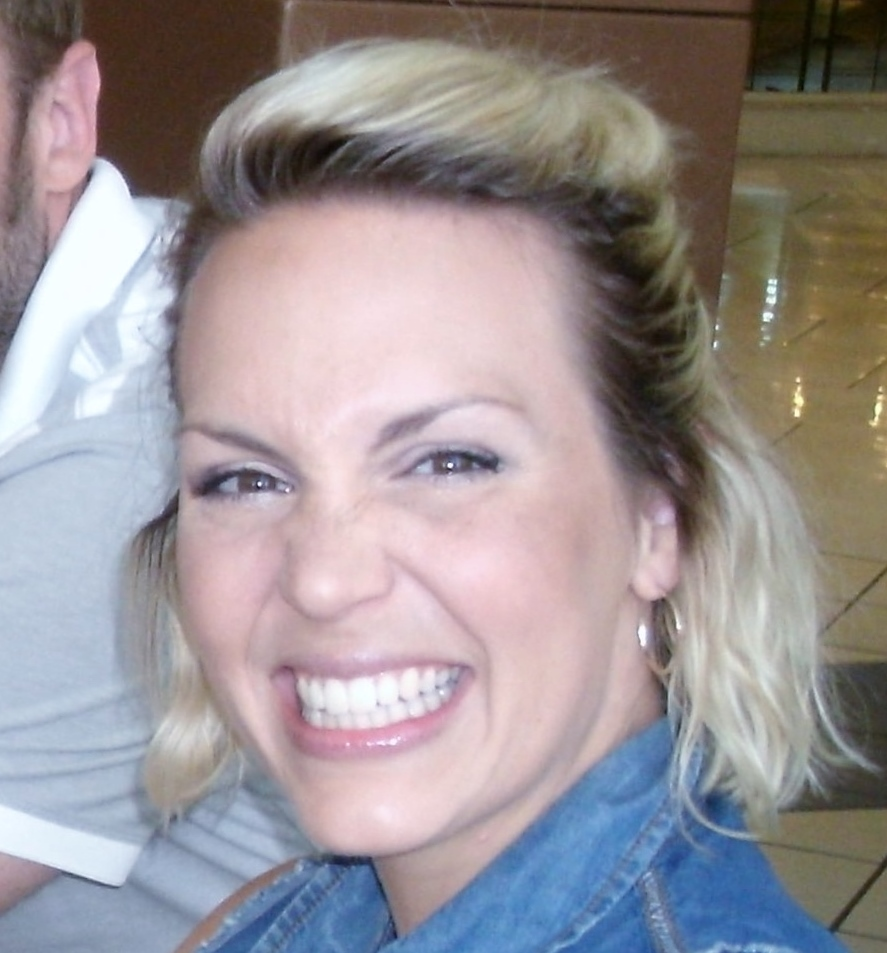
- Hollens in 2015.

Background information
- Born: Evynne Smith; Eugene, Oregon July 29, 1977
- Origin: Oregon, U.S.
- Genres: A cappella; show tunes; pop covers; Broadway
- Occupations: Singer; YouTuber; Broadway actress; vocal trainer
- Instrument: Vocals
- Years active: 2005–present
- Website: www.evynnehollens.com

YouTube information
- Channel: EvynneHollens
- Years active: 2013–present
- Genre: Music
- Subscribers: 355 thousand
- Views: 53.1 million

Evynne Hollens (née Smith) is an American vocalist who lives and works in her native Eugene, Oregon. She was one of the co-founders of the University of Oregon’s female a cappella group, Divisi, with which she sang for five years. Her name is the first word in the first chapter of the book Pitch Perfect, on which the movie of the same title is based. Her and Divisi’s adventures at the 2005 International Championship of Collegiate A Cappella Finals make up a major portion of the book.

== Career ==
In 2013, Hollens played Lucy in Avenue Q and Natalie in Next to Normal at the Oregon Contemporary Theatre. From January 15 to February 6, 2016 she performed the role of Cathy in The Last Five Years.

In April 2015, she directed a musical production of Beauty and the Beast at the Rose Children's Theater.

Hollens has been involved with over 20 productions at The John G. Shedd Institute for the Arts ("The Shedd") over the last fifteen years. Among them, she created and performed in The Contemporary Songbook Project, played Nanette in No, No, Nanette, and was in Hear My Song on May 30–31, 2015.

Evynne performed at The Shedd in her show "Evynne Hollens: Real Broadway," The Contemporary Songbook Project V, which was presented April 27 to April 29, 2018, at the Jaqua Concert Hall. This will include Milagro, a bilingual musical written by her and Portland singer-songwriter Anna Gilbert.

Peter and Evynne Hollens debuted on Broadway in the show "Home For the Holidays, Live on Broadway" which was presented November 17 to December 30, 2017, at the August Wilson Theatre.

Hollens frequently posted to YouTube between 2013 and 2022, often collaborating with her husband Peter Hollens and with pianist Nathan Alef. She has recorded a number of showtunes including "Somewhere" from West Side Story and "Defying Gravity" from Wicked. Her "Shake it Out/Shake it Off" mashup received over 200,000 views in the first four days of its release and was featured on Buzzfeed and Mashable. Her "Taylor Swift 1989 in 4 Minutes" collaboration with Peter attracted even more interest, provoking articles in Mashable, BillBoard, Fascinately, Deseret News, Melty, Virgin Radio, and El Comercio.

Hollens’ "Evolution of the Disney Princess" video received over 1,000,000 views in the week following its release on March 3, 2016. Articles about this video appeared on Time.com, Teen Vogue Pop Buzz, BuzzFeed and on the "Oh My Disney" blog on Disney.com. The video has since amassed over 14 million views.

== Personal life ==
In 2007, Smith married Peter Hollens. She has her own YouTube channel, posting music videos, occasionally collaborating with her husband. She co-wrote a musical called "Milagro", which was first performed in 2018. The couple performed in their first Broadway show, Home for the Holidays, in November 2017. They have two sons named Ashland (b. 2014) and Saylor (b. 2018).
