= The Sing-Off season 4 =

The Sing-Off
- Season 4
- Hosted by: Nick Lachey
- Judges: Ben Folds; Shawn Stockman; Jewel
- Winner: Home Free
- Runner-up: Ten

Release
- Original network: NBC
- Original release: December 9 – December 23, 2013

Season chronology
- ← Previous; Season 3 Next → Season 5

The fourth season of The Sing-Off premiered on December 9, 2013. The number of a cappella groups was decreased from sixteen back to ten, resulting in a new format. Nick Lachey stayed as host for the new season, with Ben Folds and Shawn Stockman returning as judges. New to the judges' table was Jewel, who replaces Sara Bareilles, who left after one season. Deke Sharon returned as music director and vocal producer. The music staff included Ed Boyer, Ben Bram, Rob Dietz, and Nick Girard. The program ran for seven episodes over the course of two weeks and concluded on December 23, 2013.

Though the show's status was unclear after the third season concluded in 2012, NBC announced in March 2013 that it would bring back the program as a special like the first two seasons.

A group was eliminated from the show each week in a new feature called the "Ultimate Sing-Off", where the two groups ranked lowest at the end of each show would compete by singing the same song. The groups took turns alternating verses, before ending the song singing together. Also unlike previous seasons, the winner was chosen by the judges instead of by the general public.

== Competitors ==
Group	Finish	Number of members	Website
Home Free; Minneapolis, Minnesota	Winner on December 23, 2013	5	
Ten; Dallas, Texas	Second Place on December 23, 2013	10	
Vocal Rush; Oakland, California	Third Place on December 23, 2013	12	
The Filharmonic; Los Angeles, California	Eliminated 7th on December 19, 2013	6	
AcoUstiKats; Lexington, Kentucky	Eliminated 5 & 6th on December 18, 2013	12	
VoicePlay; Orlando, Florida	Eliminated 5 & 6th on December 18, 2013	6	
Element; New York, New York	Eliminated 4th on December 16, 2013	10	
Street Corner Renaissance; Los Angeles, California	Eliminated 3rd on December 12, 2013	5	
Calle Sol; Aguadilla, Puerto Rico	Eliminated 2nd on December 11, 2013	6	
Princeton Footnotes; Princeton, New Jersey	Eliminated 1st on December 9, 2013	13	

== Elimination table ==
Legend

Eliminated	Sing-Off Battle	Last safe	Safe	Third Place	Second Place	Winner

Date:		December 9		December 11	December 12	December 16	December 18	December 19	December 23
Place	Group	Result							
1	Home Free	3rd	—N/a	4th	—N/a	Safe	2nd	Safe	Winner
2	Ten	—N/a	2nd	1st	Safe	—N/a	3rd	Sing-Off	Second Place
3	Vocal Rush	2nd	—N/a	Last safe	—N/a	Sing-Off	1st	Safe	Third Place
4	The Filharmonic	—N/a	1st	2nd	Sing-Off	—N/a	Last safe	Eliminated	
5	AcoUstiKats	—N/a	3rd	Sing-Off	Safe	—N/a	Eliminated		
6	VoicePlay	—N/a	Sing-Off	3rd	—N/a	Safe	Eliminated		
7	Element	—N/a	Last safe	Last safe	—N/a	Eliminated			
8	Street Corner Renaissance	1st	—N/a	5th	Eliminated				
9	Calle Sol	Last safe	—N/a	Eliminated					
10	Princeton Footnotes	Sing-Off	Eliminated						

== Performances ==
=== Episode 1 (December 9, 2013) ===
- Theme: Contestants' choice
- Group Performance: "Some Nights", "We Are Young", and "Carry On" by fun.

A summary of the groups' performances on the first episode, along with the results.
Group	Order	Song	Result
First Half
Vocal Rush	1	"Bottom of the River" by Delta Rae	Safe
Home Free	2	"Cruise" by Florida Georgia Line	Safe
Princeton Footnotes	3	"I Knew You Were Trouble" by Taylor Swift	Bottom Two
Calle Sol	4	"Pon de Replay" by Rihanna	Last Safe
Street Corner Renaissance	5	"What Makes You Beautiful" by One Direction	Safe
Second Half
Ten	6	"Tell Me Something Good" by Rufus and Chaka Khan	Safe
Element	7	"Burn" by Ellie Goulding	Last safe
VoicePlay	8	"Feel This Moment" by Pitbull feat. Christina Aguilera	Bottom Two
The Filharmonic	9	"Treasure" by Bruno Mars	Safe
AcoUstiKats	10	"Blurred Lines" by Robin Thicke feat. Pharrell Williams	Safe
Ultimate Sing-Off Challenge
Princeton Footnotes	1	"Bye Bye Bye" by 'N Sync	Eliminated
VoicePlay	2	"Bye Bye Bye" by 'N Sync	Safe

=== Episode 2 (December 11, 2013) ===
- Theme: Party Anthems
- Group Performance: "Let's Get It Started" by The Black Eyed Peas, "Die Young" by Ke$ha and "Don't Stop the Music" by Rihanna.

A summary of the groups' performances on the second episode, along with the results.
Group	Order	Song	Result
Vocal Rush	1	"Gonna Make You Sweat (Everybody Dance Now)" by C+C Music Factory	Last Safe
Home Free	2	"Life Is a Highway" by Tom Cochrane	Safe
VoicePlay	3	"Play That Funky Music" by Wild Cherry	Safe
Street Corner Renaissance	4	"Do You Love Me" by The Contours	Safe
Element	5	"Raise Your Glass" by P!nk	Last Safe
AcoUstiKats	6	"Hey Ya!" by OutKast	Bottom Two
Calle Sol	7	"Livin' la Vida Loca" by Ricky Martin	Bottom Two
Ten	8	"Hot in Herre" by Nelly	Safe
The Filharmonic	9	"This Is How We Do It" by Montell Jordan	Safe
Ultimate Sing-Off Challenge
Calle Sol	1	"Stronger (What Doesn't Kill You)" by Kelly Clarkson	Eliminated
AcoUstiKats	2	"Stronger (What Doesn't Kill You)" by Kelly Clarkson	Safe

=== Episode 3 (December 12, 2013) ===
- Theme: #1 Hits
- Group Performance: "In Your Eyes" by Peter Gabriel.

A summary of the groups' performances on the third episode, along with the results.
Group	Order	Song	Result
Ten	1	"Chain of Fools" by Aretha Franklin	Safe
AcoUstiKats	2	"Amazed" by Lonestar	Safe
Street Corner Renaissance	3	"Forget You" by CeeLo Green	Bottom Two
The Filharmonic	4	"One More Night" by Maroon 5	Bottom Two
Ultimate Sing-Off Challenge
Street Corner Renaissance	1	"Na Na Hey Hey Kiss Him Goodbye" by Steam	Eliminated
The Filharmonic	2	"Na Na Hey Hey Kiss Him Goodbye" by Steam	Safe

=== Episode 4 (December 16, 2013) ===
- Theme: My Generation
- Group Performance: "My Generation" by The Who, "We Will Rock You" by Queen, and "It's Time" by Imagine Dragons.

A summary of the groups' performances on the fourth episode, along with the results.
Group	Order	Song	Result
Home Free	1	"Ring of Fire" by Johnny Cash	Safe
VoicePlay	2	"Don't Speak" by No Doubt	Safe
Element	3	"You Keep Me Hangin' On" by The Supremes	Bottom Two
Vocal Rush	4	"Holding Out for a Hero" by Bonnie Tyler	Bottom Two
Ultimate Sing-Off Challenge
Element	1	"Survivor" by Destiny's Child	Eliminated
Vocal Rush	2	"Survivor" by Destiny's Child	Safe

=== Episode 5 (December 18, 2013) ===
- Theme: Movie Night
- Group Performance: "(I've Had) The Time of My Life" from the film Dirty Dancing.
- In this episode every group competes in the Ultimate Sing-Off Challenge by default.

A summary of the groups' performances on the fifth episode, along with the results.
Group	Order	Song	Result
Home Free	1	"Oh, Pretty Woman" from the film Pretty Woman (by Roy Orbison)	—N/a
Vocal Rush	2	"Against All Odds (Take a Look at Me Now)" from the film Against All Odds (by Phil Collins)	—N/a
AcoUstiKats	3	"Old Time Rock and Roll" from the film Risky Business (by Bob Seger)	—N/a
The Filharmonic	4	"I Don't Want to Miss a Thing" from the film Armageddon (by Aerosmith)	—N/a
VoicePlay	5	"Don't You (Forget About Me)" from the film The Breakfast Club (by Simple Minds)	—N/a
Ten	6	"Skyfall" from the film Skyfall (by Adele)	—N/a
Ultimate Sing-Off Challenge
AcoUstiKats	1	"Eye of the Tiger" from the film Rocky III (by Survivor)	Eliminated
VoicePlay	2	"Eye of the Tiger" from the film Rocky III (by Survivor)	Eliminated
Vocal Rush	1	"Fame" from the film Fame (by Irene Cara)	Safe
Ten	2	"Fame" from the film Fame (by Irene Cara)	Safe
Home Free	1	"I'm Alright" from the film Caddyshack (by Kenny Loggins)	Safe
The Filharmonic	2	"I'm Alright" from the film Caddyshack (by Kenny Loggins)	Last Safe

=== Episode 6 (December 19, 2013) ===
- Theme: Judges' Choice
- Group Performance: "Shake It Out" by Florence and the Machine.

A summary of the groups' performances on the sixth episode, along with the results.
Group	Order	Song	Result
The Filharmonic	1	"Baby I Need Your Loving" by The Four Tops	Bottom Two
Ten	2	"Proud Mary" by Ike & Tina Turner (originally by Creedence Clearwater Revival)	Bottom Two
Home Free	3	"Colder Weather" by Zac Brown Band	Safe
Vocal Rush	4	"My Songs Know What You Did in the Dark (Light Em Up)" by Fall Out Boy	Safe
Ultimate Sing-Off Challenge
Ten	1	"Should I Stay or Should I Go" by The Clash	Safe
The Filharmonic	2	"Should I Stay or Should I Go" by The Clash	Eliminated

=== Episode 7 (December 23, 2013) ===
- Group Performance including all groups from Season 4: "Man in the Mirror" by Michael Jackson.
- Nick Lachey and Jewel sang "It Had to Be You" to each other at the beginning of the episode.
- Pentatonix (season 3 winners) performed "I Need Your Love" by Calvin Harris feat. Ellie Goulding.
- 98 Degrees performed "I'll Be Home for Christmas"

A summary of the groups' performances on the seventh episode, along with the results.
Group	Order	Collaboration Song	Order	Individual Song	Result
Ten	1	"Joyful, Joyful" from Sister Act 2: Back in the Habit (with Shawn Stockman)	4	"Love on Top" by Beyonce	Second Place
Home Free	5	"Little Drummer Boy" (with Jewel)	2	"I Want Crazy" by Hunter Hayes	Winner
Vocal Rush	3	"Peace on Earth/Little Drummer Boy" by David Bowie and Bing Crosby (with Ben Folds)	6	"Roar" by Katie Perry	Third Place

== Ratings ==
Order	Airdate	Rating/Share (18-49)	Viewers (millions)	Rank (Timeslot)	Rank (Night)
1	December 9, 2013	2.4/6	8.39	#1	#2
2	December 11, 2013	1.8/5	6.03	#1	#7
3	December 12, 2013	1.3/4	4.58	#3	#8
4	December 16, 2013	2.0/6	7.28	#1	#6
5	December 18, 2013	1.6/5	5.49	#2	#6
6	December 19, 2013	1.2/4	4.48	#4	#8
7	December 23, 2013	1.4/4	5.32	#1	#1

== Contestants' appearances on other talent shows ==
- Jo Vinson of Element appeared on season three of The Sing-Off as a member of Delilah.
- VJ Rosales of The Filharmonic appeared on season three of The Voice, but he failed to turn a chair.
