= Deke Sharon =

American a cappella singer and arranger

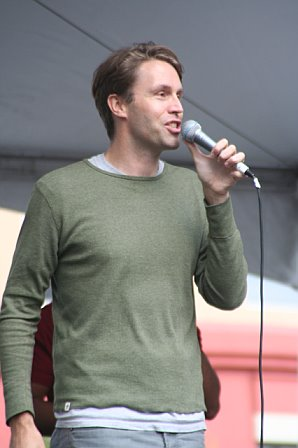
- On stage with the House Jacks, 2006

Background information
- Also known as: Deke Robertson
- Born: Kurk Richard Toohey, Jr. December 12, 1967 (age 58); San Francisco
- Origin: San Francisco, California, USA
- Genre: A Cappella
- Occupations: Singer; arranger; composer; director; producer; television producer; teacher
- Instruments: Vocals; instrument mimicry
- Years active: 1991–present
- Labels: Tommy Boy; Warner Bros. Records; Hot Lips Records; Artelier; Atlantic Records; Sony Music Latin; Epic; Universal Records; Universal Classics; Hollywood Records; Walt Disney Records
- Publishers: Contemporary A Cappella Publishing, Hal Leonard, University of Northern Colorado jazz press, Barbershop Harmony Society, The Globe Pequot Publishing Group, GIA Publications, Bloomsbury Publishing, Rowman & Littlefield
- Formerly of: The House Jacks; Tufts Beelzebubs
- Website: Official website

Deke Sharon (born December 12, 1967) is an American singer, arranger, composer, director, producer, author, coach, and teacher of a cappella music.

== Early life ==
Deke Sharon was born and raised in San Francisco. He started singing in choir groups at age five, including the San Francisco Boys Chorus where he toured the US and sang in operas with Pavarotti. He attended Town School for Boys and San Francisco University High School, where he sang lead (second tenor) in the barbershop quartet his freshman year in "The Music Man," and kept it going all four years, learning to direct and arrange a cappella.

=== College ===
Sharon spent his college years in Boston, graduating from Tufts University with a Bachelor of Arts in childhood studies, and a Bachelor of Music from the New England Conservatory of Music with a focus on vocal jazz, third stream, and music theory.

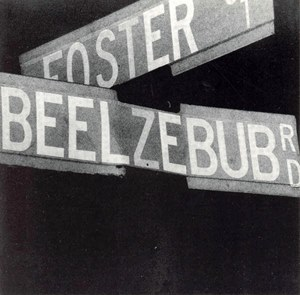
Tufts Beelzebubs' Foster Street (1991)

In college, he directed the collegiate a cappella group the Tufts Beelzebubs, transforming the group's sound to reflect modern rock, with intricate instrumental vocalizations and the integration of vocal percussion. The 1990–1991 Beelzebubs album Foster Street that he directed musically is credited with the creation of the modern a cappella sound, most notably vocal percussion. He chose the name "contemporary a cappella" in college to describe this new style.

Sharon had to audition three times before he was accepted, as he was seen as "overzealous" during a time when a cappella was not popular, a fact which was mentioned in the book "Pitch Perfect." Beca and Benji in the Pitch Perfect films are partially based on Sharon. During this time, he decided to make a career of contemporary a cappella and popularize this new style, despite being laughed at and told it was impossible, "like making a career of professional Tiddlywinks."

== Film ==
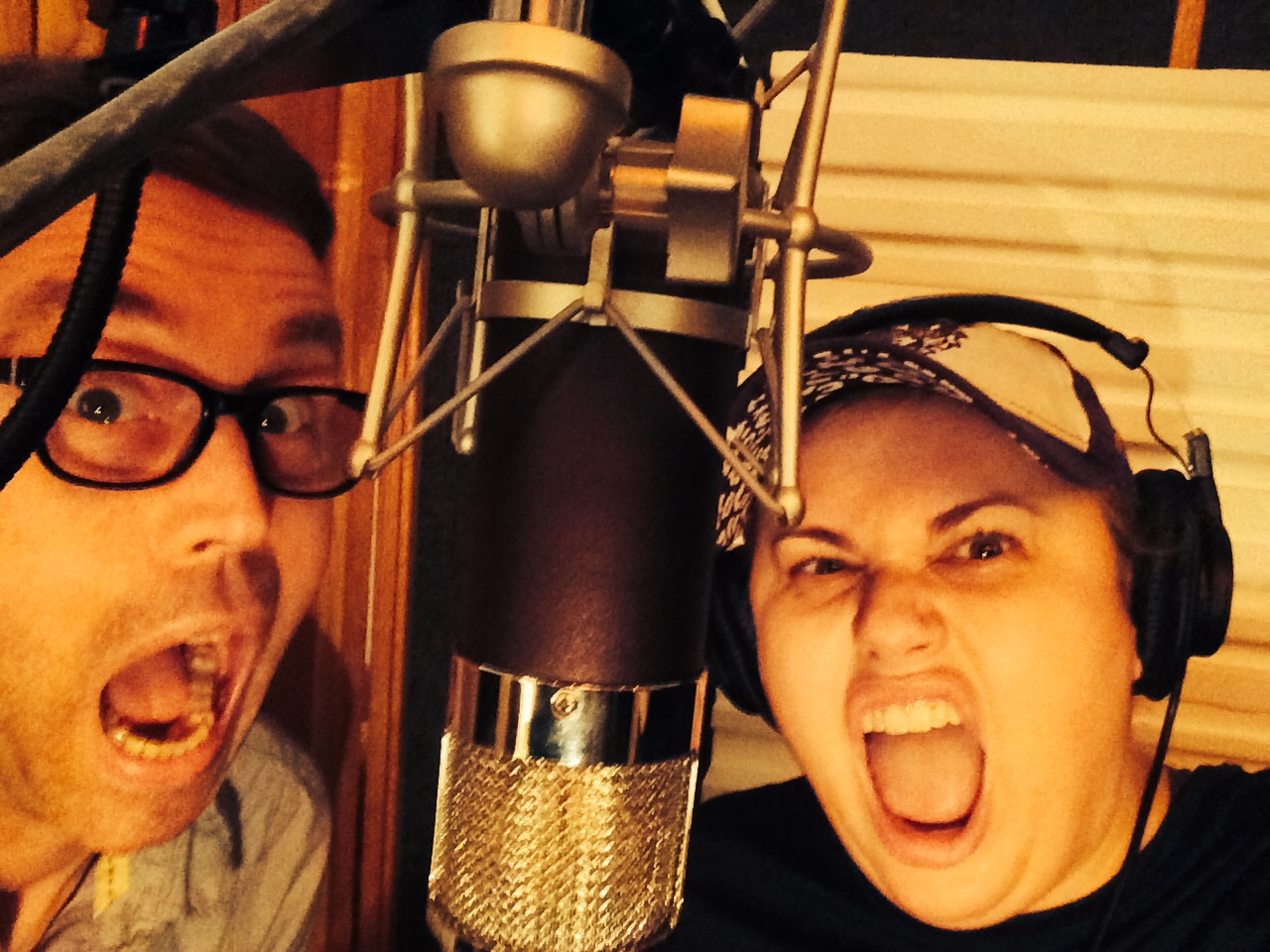
Deke and Rebel Wilson recording the Pitch Perfect 2 Finale

Sharon was the music director and arranger for the film Pitch Perfect, as well as singing on several of the songs, where he was credited on screen as "Male Voice #1." He returned for Pitch Perfect 2, in which he has a brief cameo as the German judge and broadcaster. He helped involve several professional a cappella groups and singers with the film, including The Filharmonic, Penn Masala, and Pentatonix. Sharon also worked with the Green Bay Packers. He returned to music-direct, arrange, and vocally produce for Pitch Perfect 3. He had also arranged for the film, The Social Network.

== Television ==
In December 2009, he acted as music director, arranger, coach, and consultant behind the scenes on America's first a cappella reality show competition, titled The Sing-Off, and returned in 2010 as one of the show's producers. He also served as Executive Music Producer on the Dutch Sing Off, Sing Off South Africa and Sing-Off China, including several guest appearances as a judge and performer.

Along with The House Jacks, he sang and performed the 2011 Monday Night Football theme song "Are You Ready for Some Football" with Hank Williams, Jr.

He worked with Straight No Chaser on their first PBS special Live in New York.

He appeared in front of the camera for the first time on Lifetime's Pitch Slapped reality show, in which he coached after school high school a cappella group Stay Tuned from Cherry Hill, New Jersey, focusing both on their musicality and emotional delivery. The show also aired overseas in London, Israel (where its name in Hebrew means "a cappella battle") across Latin America, Indonesia and the Philippines (under the name Pitch Battle).

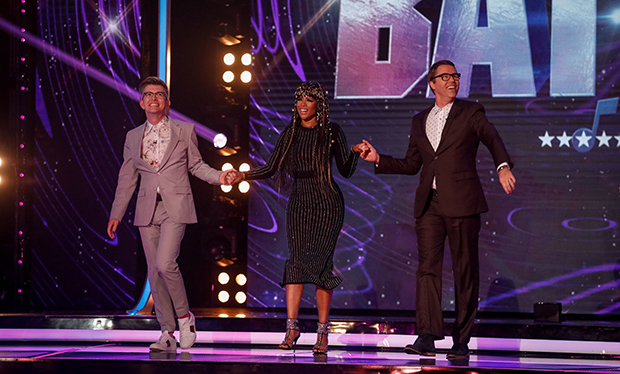
Pitch Battle Finale Judges: Gareth Malone, Kelis, Deke Sharon

As of summer 2017 he is series music director for a new competitive choir show on BBC1 called Pitch Battle, as well as appearing on camera each episode providing insight and commentary. He was also the third judge for the season one live finale.

He judged Eurovision Choir 2019. In 2022 music directed "Best in Snow" for Disney+ as well as co-arranged/vocal produced the a cappella scenes in Pitch Perfect: Bumper in Berlin.

== Performing career ==
Upon graduation in 1991, he moved back to San Francisco, bringing with him a handful of other collegiate a cappella singers to form The House Jacks, a pioneering a cappella group known for its original music and sound, often called "the original rock band without instruments", in part because they were the first a cappella group with a designated vocal percussionist.

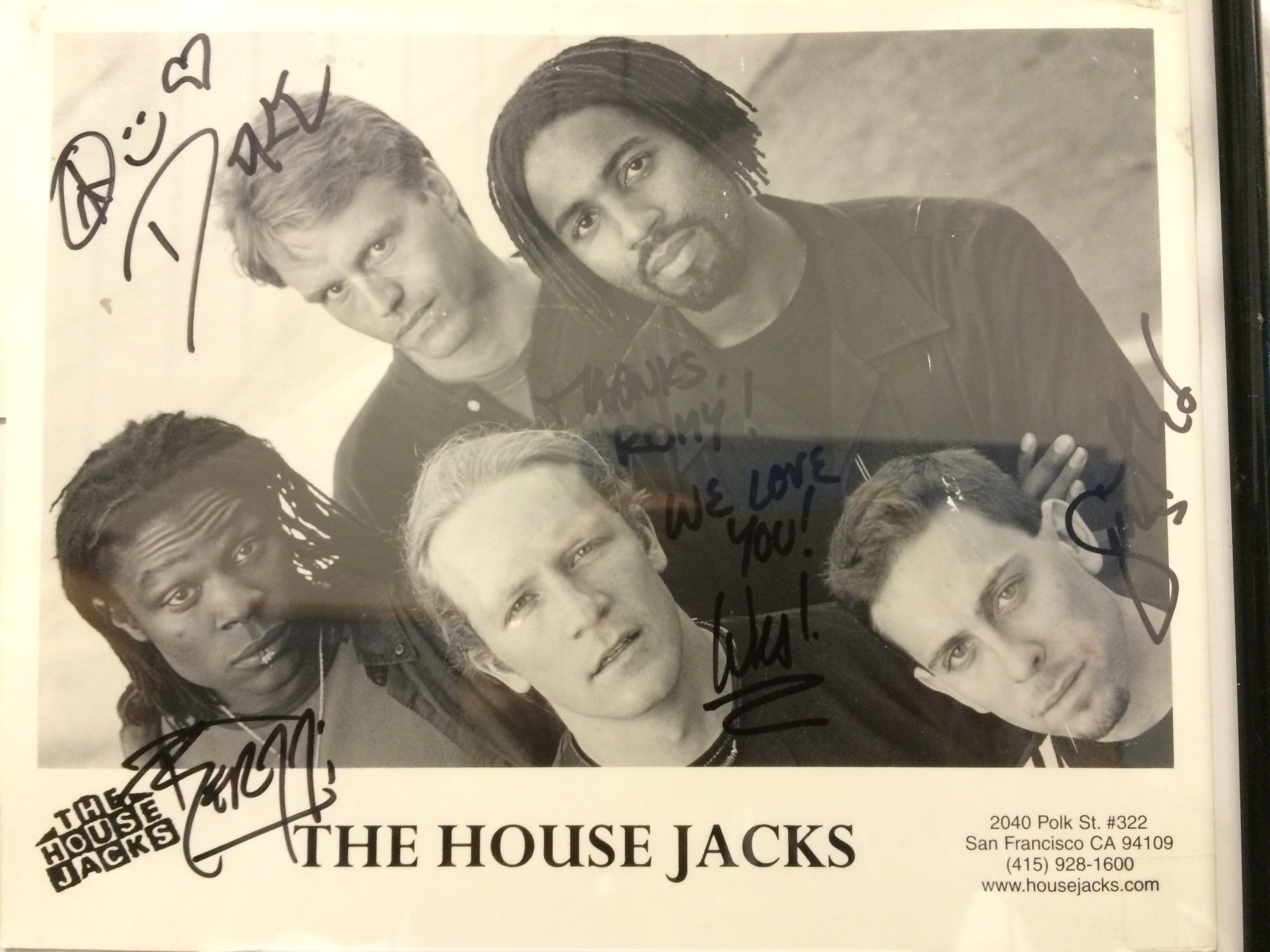
House Jacks Promo Photo (circa 2001)

The House Jacks have released seven albums (signed to Warner Brothers/Tommy Boy Records in the mid-1990s) and completed several world tours. He has performed with many musicians, including Ray Charles, Crosby, Stills and Nash, LL Cool J, Run DMC, The Temptations, and James Brown. They have won "Best Pop Rock Album" from the Contemporary A Cappella Society, for "Unbroken" (2004), "Level" (2010), and "Pollen (2014).

He also performs as a solo artist, with groups such as the San Francisco Gay Men's Chorus and at events like Singapore's "Vocal Edge" and directing DCINY's annual "Total Vocal" at Carnegie Hall as well as serving as Emcee for a cappella events, such as the annual Techapella concerts in the San Francisco Bay Area.

Studio session credits include the Wii game Just Dance Kids 2 including the songs "The Lion Sleeps Tonight", "Barbara Ann", and "Mahna Mahna".

== Arranging ==
Sharon has arranged more than 2,000 songs for a wide range of ensembles.

Sharon has won awards for vocal music arranging. He was named "favorite arranger" in the 2010 A Cappella Community Awards and won "Best Professional Arrangement" in 2019. The Best Arrangement award at the Colorado Harmony Sweepstakes was named after him after he won that same award at the Harmony Sweepstakes several times.

== Live music direction and production ==
He founded and directed a cappella groups at Walt Disney World/Epcot (American Vybe) and Disneyland (Groove 66). In 2013, he created a new professional a cappella ensemble in New Mexico: "Voasis". In 2014 and 2015 he music-directed the Sing Off Live tour He created Vocalosity for which he was artistic producer, music director, and arranger. They started touring in 2016 and their debut album was released on Universal Classics.

In December 2017 he announced the formation of DCappella, a seven-member contemporary a cappella group launched in 2018 that will tour performing arts centers singing music from classic and contemporary Disney films. He serves as the group's co-creator, music director, arranger, album producer and artistic producer integrating modern sounds and technology. He also Music Directed "Disney: The Castle" in Riyadh, Saudi Arabia in 2023.

His production with Columbia Artists Management, "A Cappella Live," toured the US featuring four a cappella acts: Committed (vocal group), The Filharmonic, Women of the World, and Blake Lewis.

== Album production ==
As a producer of a cappella recordings, he is known for having changed the sound of collegiate a cappella recording via the Beelzebubs' album Code Red. He has arranged and produced multiple albums and tracks for Atlantic Records' Straight No Chaser, including the certified gold "Christmas Cheers".

In the early 1990s, he co-founded The Best of College A Cappella (BOCA) compilation, which he now produces annually with Varsity Vocals.

== Event production and promotion ==
In college, he brought the Harmony Sweepstakes A Cappella Festival to the East Coast, producing the first Boston regional with the Beelzebubs. Shortly after college he founded the International Championship of Collegiate A Cappella (ICCA), the West and East Coast A Cappella Summits (the first contemporary a cappella conferences), and a number of other a cappella-related projects, programs, and events with the goal of popularizing a cappella. Recent festivals include Aca-West in San Francisco, VoiceJam in Arkansas, Solevoci in Italy, Vocal Asia (in Japan, China, and Taiwan), Aarhus Vocal Festival in Denmark, and Croappella in Croatia where he often hosts the evening concert or competition as well as teaches during the day.

He is a frequent host and emcee at a cappella events, such as Silicon Valley's "Techapella", The National A Cappella Convention, The annual College Notes event in Walnut Creek CA, "Pacific Harmony" in New Zealand, AKA A Cappella in Singapore, and the Maui Barbershop Festival. Some of the videos he has posted to promote a cappella groups around the world have gone viral. He's also frequently in residency or headlining events at universities such as Indiana U, Midland U and Tufts U and co created as well as emceed the "History of Harmony" concerts with Chicago A Cappella.

He's also active in the choral world, presenting at choral festivals, such as the World Choir Games in 2021 in Flanders and 2024 in New Zealand, World Symposium on Choral Music, Cambridge Choir Festival, GALA Choruses and Chorus America, as well as the Barbershop community with the Barbershop Harmony Society and Sweet Adelines International.

His work to popularize and promote a cappella worldwide is now being recognized by major media: "A Capella [sic] is more popular than ever, thanks to this guy" (NPR Here and Now), "Deke Sharon makes a cappella cool again" (NPR All Things Considered).

== Organizations ==
In his college dorm he founded The Contemporary A Cappella Society and The Ultimate A Cappella Arranging Service (which became TotalVocal). Shortly after graduation, he created the Contemporary A Cappella Recording Awards ("CARAs"), a cappella's equivalent of the Grammy Awards.

He formed the Contemporary A Cappella League, a new national network of adult "post-collegiate" a cappella groups.

== Writing ==
- A Cappella Arranging, his first book, co-authored with Dylan Bell, was published in 2012.
- A Cappella, a general interest book covering many aspects of the style, co-authored with Ben Spalding and Brody McDonald, was released in 2015.
- The Heart of Vocal Harmony, about how vocal harmony groups can perform with unified emotion, was released in early 2016.
- A Cappella Warmups for Pop and Jazz Choirs and
- So You Want To Sing A Cappella were both released in 2017.
- Teaching Music Through Performance in Contemporary A Cappella, the first contemporary a cappella repertoire guide, was released summer 2020
- A Cappella Arranging 2.0: The Next Level, building off of the concepts of the original, was released in 2024

Biographical Information about Deke Sharon can be found in Mickey Rapkin's Pitch Perfect (2008), Rick Smolan's 24 Hours in Cyberspace (1996), Joshua Duchan's Powerful Voices (2012), Alysia Abbott's Fairyland (2013) Darren Pleasance's "True North" (2023), Carsten Gerlitz's Popchor (2018) and "In Camaraderie" by Rajiv Mehta (2026)

== Musical theater ==
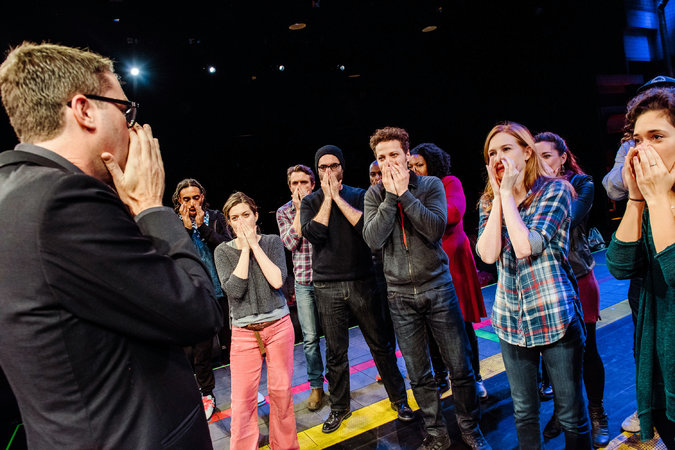
Teaching vocal instrumental sounds to the cast of In Transit

The pioneering, first all-a cappella musical on Broadway, In Transit, for which he is co-producer and arranged all the music, opened at the Circle in the Square Theater on Broadway in December 2016. He started working with the production just after their off-Broadway run five years earlier.

Vocalosity, a live a cappella theatrical concert production with diverse cast, began touring in January 2016 and has performed in 30 states.

He has worked on a cappella musical theatre projects including "Street" and "Our World".

He arranged the opening number for Andrew Lloyd Webber's new greatest hits musical "Unmasked", a fast-paced mashup of 17 of his greatest hits.

== Education ==
He co-founded and directs Camp Acappella for teens and adults each summer at Wright State University in Dayton, Ohio and teaches the music production class Soup To Nuts periodically. as well as travels to other countries to work with groups in person, such as New Zealand, Brazil, Italy, Sri Lanka and Singapore.

His YouTube channel features a variety of educational topics including how to sound like several different instruments. A GE special features him discussing the physics of a cappella.

In 2016, he joined the California branch of the American Choral Directors Association as the first ever Contemporary A Cappella R&R chair. and co-created Acappella.how for google His Camp A Cappella Intensive in Washington DC started in 2022, a partnership with Ben Folds, Planet Word, and the National Symphony Orchestra.

== Awards ==
The Pitch Perfect soundtrack earned several awards, including an RIAA platinum record certification, the American Music Award for best soundtrack, an Online Film and Television Association nomination for Best Music, Adapted Song (Don't You Forget About Me) and an MTV Video Music Award for "Best Musical Moment".

The Pitch Perfect 2 soundtrack, which debuted at No. 1 on the Billboard 200, secured the American Music Award for best Soundtrack and a Grammy nomination for Best Soundtrack.

As album producer, he was nominated for a Dove Award in 2012 (Best Contemporary Gospel Album: Committed).

In 2016, he became an honorary member of the Barbershop Harmony Society, one of only twenty since 1938, and he was named an honorary member of BYU Vocal Point. In 2017 he was awarded the P.T. Barnum Award for excellence in Entertainment from his alma mater, Tufts University.

He has received two lifetime achievement awards for his work in a cappella: in 2016 for the 25th anniversary of his founding of thee Contemporary A Cappella Society and in 2018, from the A Cappella Music Awards.

== Other ==
He has been referred to as "the father of contemporary a cappella" and "the godfather of a cappella".

He is known for his ability to replicate a variety of instruments (e.g. trumpet, guitar, flute, violin, muted trumpet, harmonica) with his voice—which he teaches online and via "Singing Instruments" seminars—teaching summer camp for young vocalists, and adjudicating choral festivals around the world. He has worked with many professional pop vocal groups, including 98 Degrees, The Nylons and Boyz II Men.

Helping groups get started has been an ongoing goal of his for 30 years, which he does by providing free advice, support and arrangements. He also works with organizations philanthropically who support vocal harmony.

He served on the CASA board for almost twenty years, often as President or Vice President. Acapellablog named him the number-one "a cappella power player to keep an eye on in 2012", and NPR credits him for "making a cappella cool again".

In 2016 he launched an a cappella podcast called "Counterpoint" with co-host Robert Dietz and has appeared on other podcasts.

To help promote Good Omens, he arranged several songs for "The Chattering Order of St Beryl," a group of singing nuns., and co-created Walmart's "Sparkappella."

When the cult NXIVM tried to use a cappella as a recruiting device, he drew out Keith Raniere in a public forum, resulting in his being put on their list of enemies.

He has been featured repeatedly in Kiplinger's Personal Finance for socially responsible investing.

He says his life's work is "to get more people singing" because "music can build a better community" as "our country needs to understand the importance of working together". His motto is "Harmony through harmony."

== Selected bibliography ==
Title	Year	Category	ISBN	
A Cappella Arranging	2012	Non fiction	ISBN 1458416577	ISBN 9781538185308
A Cappella	2015	Non fiction	ISBN 147061667X	
The Heart of Vocal Harmony: Emotional Expression in Group Singing	2016	Non fiction	ISBN 1495057836	
A Cappella Warmups for Pop and Jazz Choirs	2017	Non fiction	ISBN 0793595290	
So You Want To Sing A Cappella: A Guide For Performers	2017	Non fiction	ISBN 153810587X	
Teaching Music Through Performance in Contemporary A Cappella	2020	Non fiction	ISBN 9781622774876	
A Cappella Arranging 2.0: The Next Level	2024	Non fiction	ISBN 9781538172667	ISBN 9781538172674

Title	Year	Category	ISBN
Contemporary A Cappella Songbook Vol 1	1996	Song book	ISBN 0793595290
Contemporary A Cappella Songbook Vol 2	1997	Song book	ISBN 0793595282
A CASA Christmas	1998	Song book	ISBN 0793595274
Songs For All Occasions	1999	Song book	ISBN 0634011707
I Feel Good: A Contemporary A Cappella Collection	2000	Song book	ISBN 0634025600
Natural Woman	2001	Song book	ISBN 0634033611
Shout	2002	Song book	ISBN 0634055127
Girls Just Wanna Have Fun	2003	Song book	ISBN 0634084224
Good Ol A Cappella Vol 1	2003	Song book	ISBN 0634055275
ShBoom: Contemporary A Cappella Songbook	2003	Song book	ISBN 0634055283
A Cappella Jazz Broadway	2004	Song book	ISBN 0634097776
A Cappella Jazz Classics	2004	Song book	ISBN 0634084232
Respect	2004	Song book	ISBN 0634084240
Deck The Hall	2006	Song book	ISBN 0634084216
Ya Gotta Be	2007	Song book	ISBN 1423412397
Love Songs A Cappella	2010	Song book	ISBN 0634055240
DCappella Tour Songbook	2019	Song book	ISBN 9781540041791

== Selected discography ==
Album	Year(s)	Role
Fourteen – Tufts Beelzebubs	1989	Music Director, Arranger, Vocalist, Producer
Beelzebub Winter Invitational – Tufts Beelzebubs	1990	Arranger, Vocalist, Producer
Foster Street – Tufts Beelzebubs	1991	Music Director, Arranger, Vocalist, Producer
Sing Naked – House Jacks	1991	Music Director, Arranger, Vocalist, Producer
Naked Noise – House Jacks	1994	Music Director, Arranger, Vocalist, Producer
Best of College A Cappella	1995–present	Producer
Urban Harmony: R&B A Cappella	1996	Producer
Funkwich – House Jacks	1997	Music Director, Arranger, Vocalist, Producer
A Cappella All-Stars: The CARAs	1997–2000	Producer
Harmony Sweepstakes	1997–1998	Producer
Voices Only: A Cappella Originals	1997	Producer
Yearbook: Live from Spring Thing	1997–1998	Producer
Best of High School A Cappella	1998–present	Producer
Naked Funk – House Jacks	1999	Music Director, Arranger, Vocalist, Producer
Wasting Our Parents' Money: BOCA Humor	1999	Producer
Drive – House Jacks	2001	Music Director, Arranger, Vocalist, Producer
Next – Tufts Beelzebubs	2001	Arranger, Producer
Disney's American Vybe – American Vybe	2001	Music Director, Arranger
Punch – Various	2002	Music Director, Arranger, Vocalist, Producer
Embodiment – BaSix (Denmark)	2002	Producer
Only In America – Peking and the Mystics	2002	Producer
Code Red – Tufts Beelzebubs	2003	Arranger, Producer
Unbroken – House Jacks	2004	Music Director, Arranger, Vocalist, Producer
Fitchy & Grikko – House Jacks	2005	Music Director, Arranger, Vocalist, Producer
Udder Won – Moosebutter	2005	Vocalist, Producer
Unleash the Periscope – Colorado College Back Row	2006	Producer
Get Down Mr. President – House Jacks	2007	Music Director, Arranger, Vocalist, Producer
Good Things – House Jacks	2009	Music Director, Arranger, Vocalist, Producer
Christmas Cheers – Straight No Chaser	2009	Arranger, Producer
The Sing-Off tracks – US Sing-Off Cast, Season 1–5	2009–2014	Arranger, Music Director, Producer
Go Nuts – Colorado College Back Row	2010	Producer
With A Twist – Straight No Chaser	2010	Arranger, Producer
Level – House Jacks	2010	Music Director, Arranger, Vocalist, Producer
Nota – Nota	2010	Arranger, Producer
Harmonies for the Holidays – Sing-Off Cast, Season Two	2010	Arranger, Producer
Best of The Sing-Off Season Two – Sing-Off Cast	2011	Arranger, Music Director, Producer
Committed – Committed	2011	Arranger, Producer
Songs of the Season – Sing-Off Cast, Season Three	2011	Arranger, Producer
Pitch Perfect Soundtrack – Pitch Perfect cast	2012	Arranger, Music Director, Vocalist, Producer
Act Accordingly – Gentlemen's Rule	2012	Arranger, Producer
Life's So Lyrical – Forte	2012	Arranger, Producer
Blackjack – The House Jacks	2012	Arranger, Music Director, Vocalist, Producer
Southern Autumn Nostalgia – Street Corner Symphony	2013	Arranger, Producer
Pollen – The House Jacks	2014	Arranger, Music Director, Vocalist, Producer
Best of BOCA	2014	Producer
Pitch Perfect 2 Soundtrack – Pitch Perfect Cast	2015	Arranger, Music Director, Vocalist, Producer
Pitch Slapped Live Performances – Stay Tuned	2016	Arranger, Music Director, Producer
Vocalosity – Vocalosity	2016	Arranger, Music Director, Vocalist, Producer
Straight No Chaser – I'll Have Another	2016	Arranger, Producer ("Run Run Rudolph")
In Transit – Original Broadway Cast	2017	Arranger, Producer
Pitch Perfect 3 Soundtrack – Cast	2017	Arranger, Music Director, Producer
Incredibles 2 Soundtrack – D Cappella	2018	Arranger, Music Director, Producer
Full Rally – Tufts Beelzebubs	2018	Arranger, Producer
D Cappella – D Cappella	2018	Arranger, Music Director, Producer
Unholy Night – Chattering Order of St Beryl (Good Omens)	2019	Arranger, Coach/consultant
D Cappella Japanese album – D Cappella	2019	Arranger, Music Director, Producer
SparkAppella - SparkAppella	2019	Arranger, Music Director, Producer
Rockin Holiday – D Cappella	2019	Arranger, Music Director, Producer
All Ears – D Cappella	2020	Arranger, Music Director, Producer
Holiday A Cappella – D Cappella	2021	Arranger, Music Director, Producer
Magic Reimagined – D Cappella	2022	Arranger, Music Director, Producer
Home For The Holidays – D Cappella	2022	Arranger, Music Director, Producer
Pitch Perfect: Bumper In Berlin – Soundtrack	2022	Arranger, Music Director, Producer

== See also ==
- A cappella
- Collegiate a cappella
- Contemporary A Cappella Society
