= Committed (vocal group) =

Vocal group

- Origin: Oakwood University at Huntsville, Alabama
- Genres: A cappella, gospel, urban gospel, R&B
- Instrument(s): Voice (vocal bass, vocal percussion
- Years active: 2003 - present
- Labels: Epic Records, Mixed Bag Music Group
- Members: Therry Thomas, Dennis Baptiste, Geston Pierre, Robert Pressley and Maurice Staple
- Past members: Tommy Gervais
- Website: www.committedsings.com

Committed is an a cappella group of six male vocalists from Huntsville, Alabama, all students at Oakwood University, a historically black Seventh-day Adventist school in Huntsville. The group—Therry Thomas, Dennis Baptiste, Tommy Gervais, Geston Pierre, Robert Pressley and Maurice Staple—began singing together in 2003, inspired by another a cappella group that originated at Oakwood, Take 6.

The group won the second season of the musical competition The Sing-Off. They won the title on the finale broadcast on December 20, 2010 broadcast on NBC, singing a vocal a cappella arrangement of "We Are the Champions" from Queen.

The singing group released their self-titled album Committed on Epic Records.

== Performances on The Sing Off ==
- Episode 1: "This Love"
- Episode 2: "Apologize"
- Episode 3: "Every Breath You Take"
- Episode 3: "I Want It That Way"
- Episode 4: "Let's Stay Together"
- Episode 4: "Usher medley"
- Finale: "Motownphilly"
- Finale: "Hold My Hand"
- Finale: "We Are The Champions"

== Discography ==
- Committed
- Home for Christmas
