= Stanford University Libraries =

American college library system

Stanford Libraries
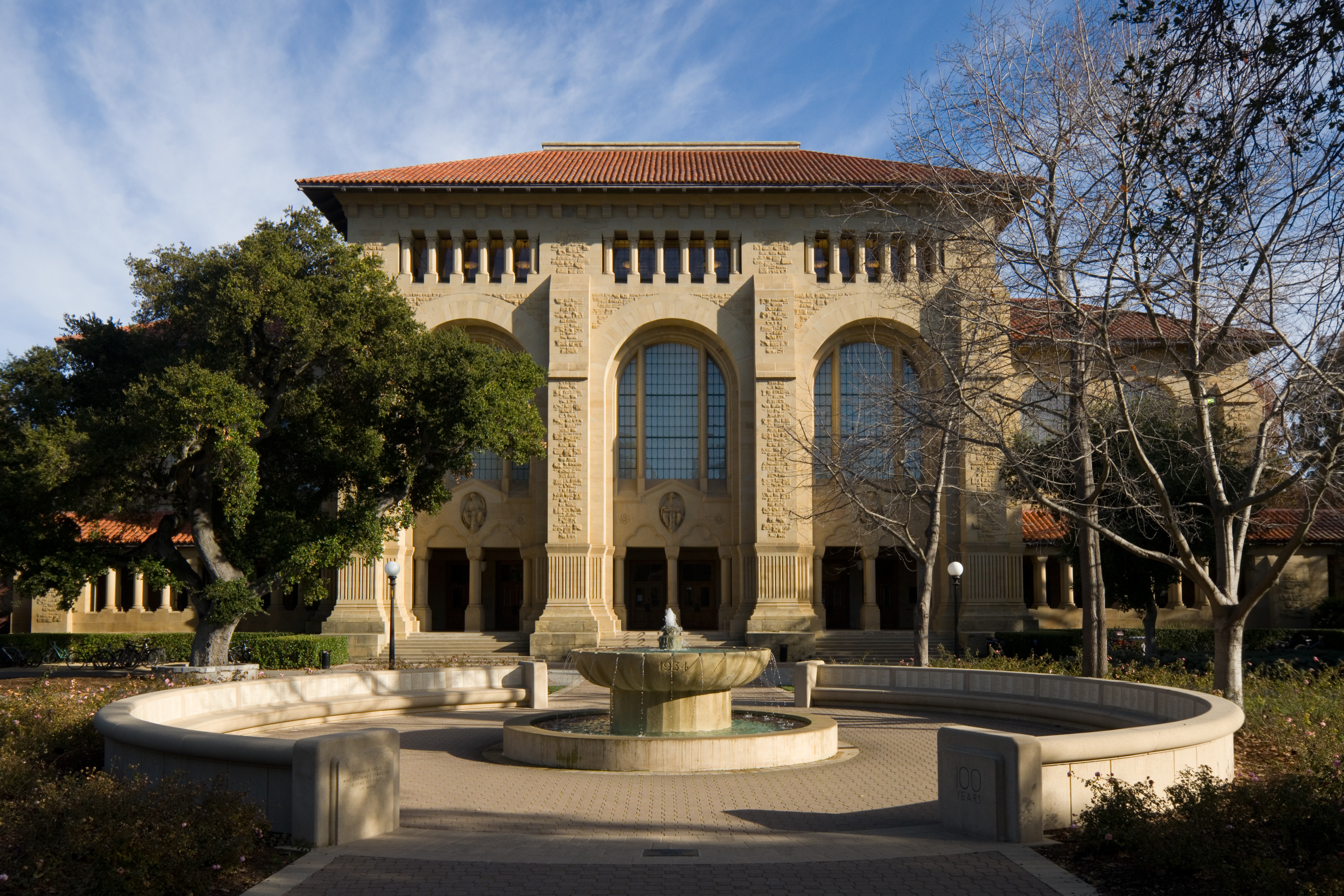
- Green Library
- 37.4268182°N 122.1693287°W
- Location: Stanford, CA
- Type: Academic library system of Stanford University
- Established: 1891
- Branches: 24

Collection
- Items collected: more than 12 million items, including 3 million ebooks, 260,000 rare or special books, 1.5 million audiovisual materials, 75,000 serials, 6 million microforms
- Size: more than 12 million (2020)

Other information
- Website: library.stanford.edu

The Stanford University Libraries (SUL), formerly known as "Stanford University Libraries and Academic Information Resources" ("SULAIR"), is the library system of Stanford University in California. It encompasses more than 24 libraries in all. Several academic departments and some residences also have their own libraries.

== Major libraries ==
The main library in the SU library system is Green Library, which also contains various meeting and conference rooms, study spaces, and reading rooms.

Lathrop Library is a 24-hour library which holds various student-accessible media resources, particularly those intended for undergraduates. It also houses the East Asia Library and is the center for new media acquisition, cataloging and shelf preparation.

The Hoover Institution Library and Archives is an archive and research center largely focused on documents of 20th century history. The Hoover Institution Library and Archives (not to be confused with the Hoover Institution think tank) is a part of SUL but has its own board of overseers.

While not publicly accessible, the largest repository of media owned by Stanford is located in Stanford Auxiliary Library 3, or SAL 3. It is located in Livermore, CA as a cost saving measure. Media can be ordered from this location for one-day delivery back to campus.

== History ==
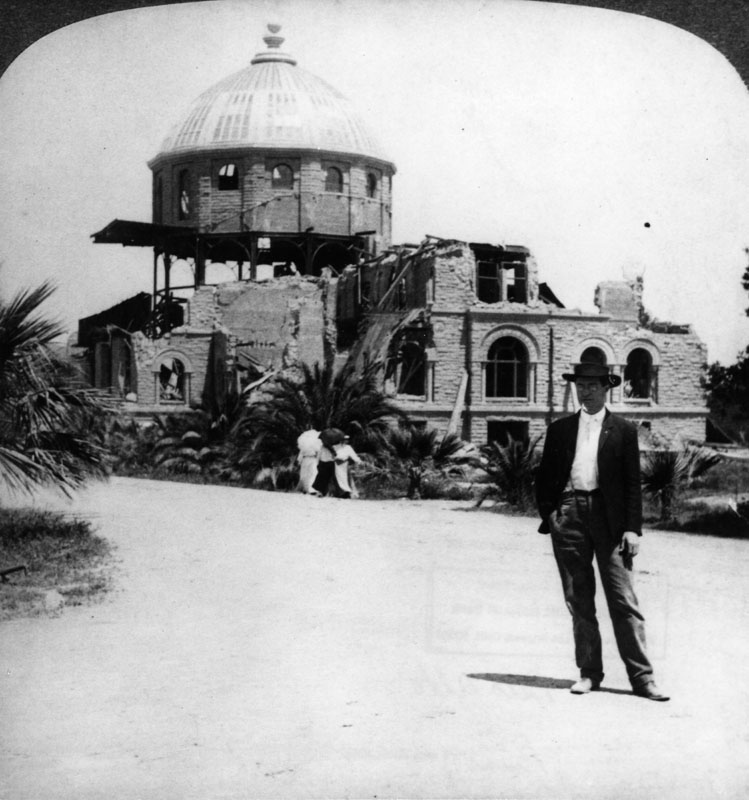
The ruins of the unfinished Stanford Library after the 1906 San Francisco earthquake

The earliest library at Stanford was in the northeast corner of the inner quadrangle. It was housed in one large room capable of accommodating 100 readers. This was replaced in 1900 by a separate building on the outer quadrangle, named the Thomas Welton Stanford Library after its major donor, Leland Stanford's younger brother. This library was soon recognized as being too small, and a new larger library in a separate building was begun; however, it was destroyed in the 1906 San Francisco earthquake before it could be completed.

A major new library was approved in 1913 and completed in 1919. This building forms the older portion of the current Green Library. In 1980, a larger annex was added and the library was renamed for Cecil Howard Green. The original part of the building is now known as the Bing Wing for Peter Bing, who donated a substantial amount of money for fixing it after the 1989 Loma Prieta earthquake.

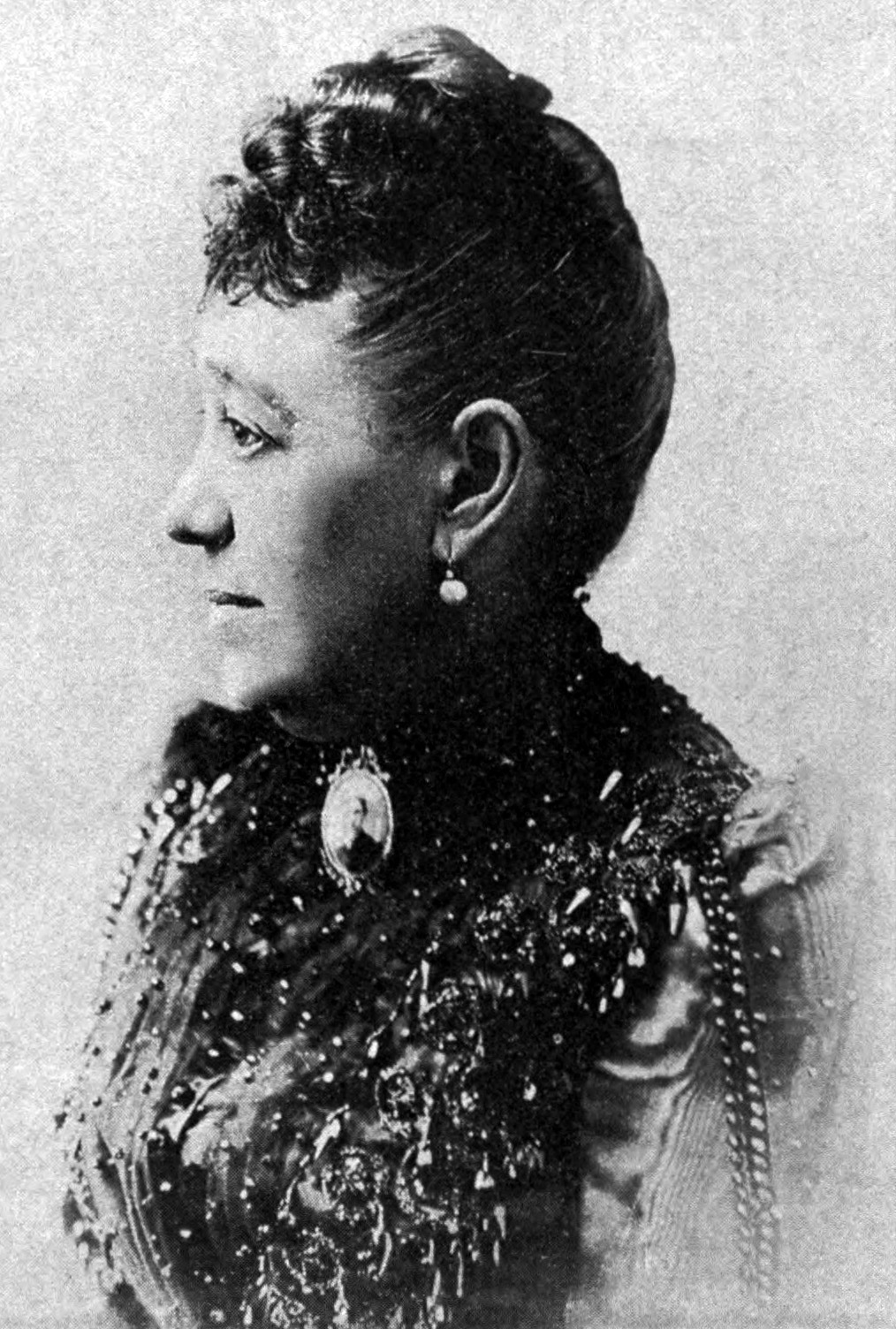
Stanford co-founder Jane Stanford directed that her jewels be sold to endow library acquisitions

In early years the acquisition of books and other materials for the libraries was dependent on donations and on the often limited general fund budget. But in 1905 Jane Stanford directed that after her death, her jewels should be sold and the funds used as a permanent endowment "to be used exclusively for the purchase of books and other publications." The board of trustees confirmed this arrangement, and the Jewel Fund was established in 1908. It has been augmenting the university's library collections for more than 100 years. The endowment, originally $500,000, is now worth about $20 million. Items purchased through the Jewel Fund display a distinctive bookplate which shows a romanticized Jane Stanford offering her jewels to Athena, the goddess of wisdom. Since 2007, benefactors who provide endowments for library acquisitions are referred to as members of the Jewel Society.

In 1908 Stanford acquired the Cooper Medical College in San Francisco, together with the 30,000 volume collection of the Levi C. Lane Medical Library Trust, as well as a building site and funds provided in Dr. Lane's will. The Lane Medical Library was dedicated on November 3, 1912; it was an integral part of the Stanford library system despite being located in San Francisco. It was moved to the main Stanford campus along with the medical school in 1959.

Herbert Hoover, who later became President of the United States, was involved in humanitarian and relief efforts in Europe before, during and after World War I. This gave him the opportunity to amass a collection of documents relating to the war, the Russian Revolution, and other historical developments of the early 20th century. Starting in 1919 he donated the collected materials to Stanford, his alma mater, along with funds to maintain and develop the documents, called the Hoover War Collection and later the Hoover War Library. The documents were initially housed within the main Stanford Library, but by 1929 the collection had reached 1.4 million items and storage was becoming a problem. In 1941 Hoover Tower was completed as a repository for the growing collection, which was eventually renamed the Hoover Institution and Library on War, Revolution and Peace.

The J. Henry Meyer Memorial Library, or Undergraduate Library, was dedicated in 1966 and closed in 2014. It was named for J. Henry Meyer, a San Francisco businessman and early supporter of Stanford, whose children were major donors toward its construction. It was replaced in 2014 by the Lathrop Library.

In the 1980s it was proposed to establish the Ronald Reagan Presidential Library at Stanford. His records from eight years as governor of California were already on campus, in the Hoover Institution library. After extensive negotiation with Reagan's advisors, the Board of Trustees in 1984 approved the placement of the Reagan library and museum on the campus. A 20-acre site near the Stanford golf course was earmarked for the facility. However, the proposal foundered over the plan by Ronald Reagan Presidential Foundation officials to include a public affairs research center and think tank as part of the facility, which Stanford's trustees said would be unacceptable, and the idea was dropped in 1987. The Reagan library, complete with public affairs center, was built in Simi Valley, California, opening in 1991. The records of his governorship were transferred there from Hoover in 2000.

== Collections ==
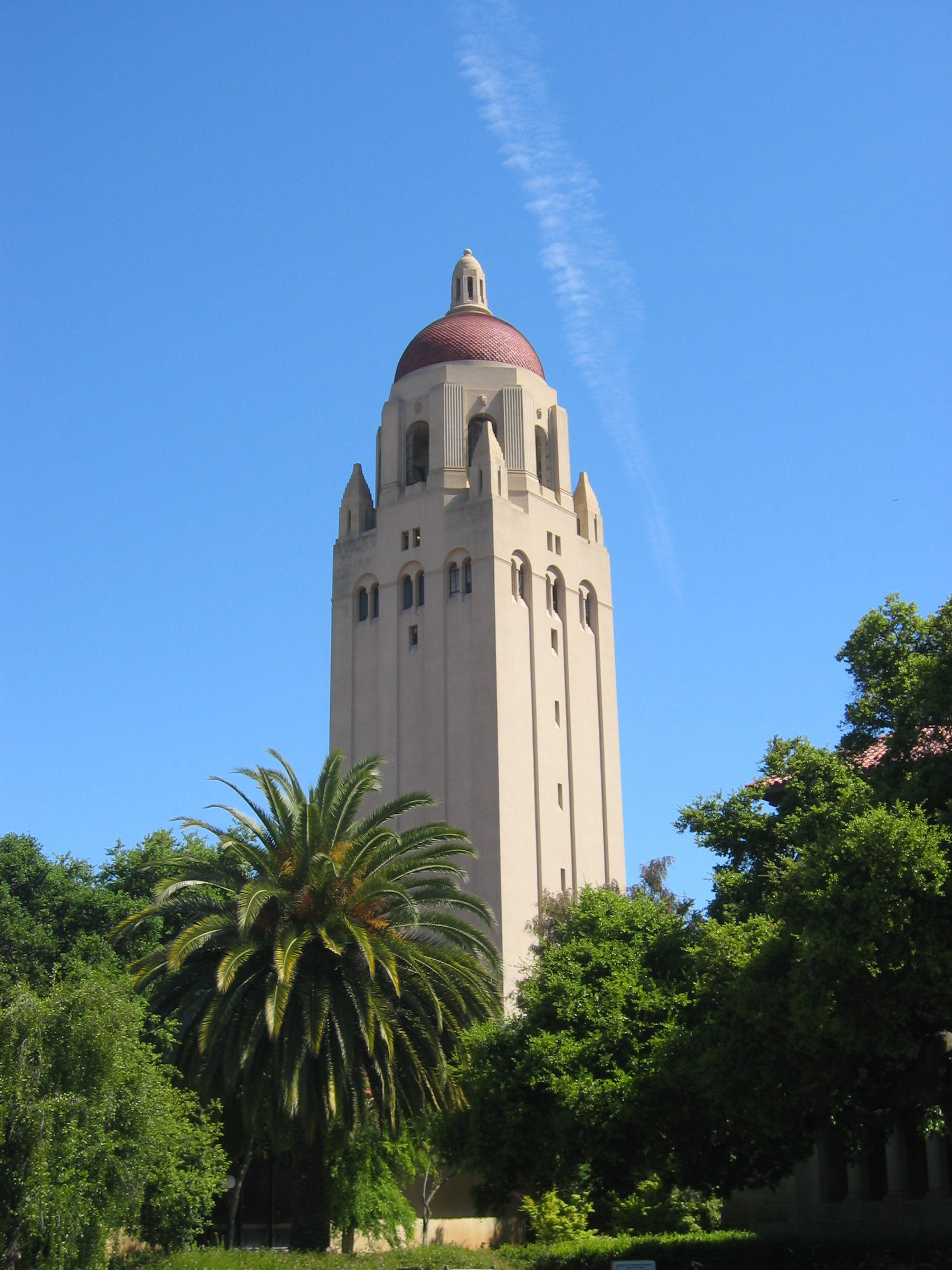
Hoover Tower, home of the Hoover Institution Library and Archives

The libraries hold a collection of nearly 12 million items, 260,000 rare or special books, 3 million e-books, 1.5 million audiovisual materials, 75,000 serials, 6 million microform holdings, and thousands of other digital resources, making it one of the largest and most diverse academic library systems in the world. Starting in 2004 the Stanford libraries have collaborated with Google in digitizing hundreds of thousands of books from the Stanford collections and making them available to readers worldwide at no charge.

Other significant collections include the Lane Medical Library, Terman Engineering Library, Jackson Business Library, Falconer Biology Library, Cubberley Education Library, Branner Earth Sciences Library, Swain Chemistry and Chemical Engineering Library, Jonsson Government Documents collection (SUL has been a Federal Depository Library since 1895, a California depository and depository for several Intergovernmental Organizations like the IMO, World Bank, EU, OECD etc.), Crown Law Library, Center for Ocean Solutions Research Library, Stanford Auxiliary Library (SAL), SLAC Library, Hoover library, Miller Marine Biology Library at Hopkins Marine Station, Music Library, and the university's special collections.

Stanford University has also developed a significant African collection, which includes the Maps of Africa Collection. This collection became recognized in 2001 with the acquisition of the Oscar I Norwich collection and subsequent acquisitions in 2010 and 2011. Today the Maps of Africa collection includes 859 maps.

== Services ==
Digital libraries and text services include digital image collections, the Humanities Digital Information Services group, and the Media Microtext Center. The Stanford University Press produces over 175 books each year.

There are 150,000 computers on the Stanford University Network, including clusters of printer-enabled computers in every undergraduate residence (the first residential computing program), as well as high-performance computer clusters for general use throughout the campus. Stanford is a founding and charter member of CENIC, the Corporation for Education Network Initiatives in California, the nonprofit organization that provides extremely high-performance Internet-based networking to California's K-20 research and education community.
