= History of Stanford University =

Stanford University was founded in the late 19th century by Leland and Jane Lathrop Stanford, in honor of their late son Leland Stanford Jr. After Leland's death a lawsuit was pursued against his estate, and alongside the Panic of 1893 put Stanford's continued existence in jeopardy. The university persevered, in part due to the Stanford family donating the equivalent of over $1 billion in 2010 dollars to the university. The 1906 San Francisco Earthquake damaged several buildings, and took the lives of two people on campus.

In the mid-20th century, Stanford became an important institution in the development of science in the United States. Frederick Terman, dean of engineering and later the provost, is often called the "Father of Silicon Valley," who helped several early technology companies in the area develop. It is the site of several physics laboratories such as SLAC National Accelerator Laboratory, and the Stanford Positron Electron Asymmetric Ring (SPEAR). Additionally, the SRI International was one of the four original nodes of ARPANET, the predecessor to the internet.

== Origins and early years (1885–1906) ==
The university officially opened on October 1, 1891 to 555 students. On the university's opening day, Founding President David Starr Jordan (1851–1931) said to Stanford's Pioneer Class: "[Stanford] is hallowed by no traditions; it is hampered by none. Its finger posts all point forward." However, much preceded the opening and continued for several years until the death of the last founder, Jane Stanford, in 1905 and the destruction by the 1906 earthquake.

=== Foundation ===
Stanford was founded by Leland Stanford, a railroad magnate, U.S. senator, and former California governor, together with his wife, Jane Lathrop Stanford. It is named in honor of their only child, Leland Stanford Jr., who died in 1884 from typhoid fever just before his 16th birthday. His parents decided to dedicate a university to their only son, and Leland Stanford told his wife, "The children of California shall be our children." The Stanfords visited Harvard's president, Charles Eliot, and asked whether they should establish a university, technical school or museum. Eliot replied that they should found a university and an endowment of $5 million would suffice (in 1884 dollars; about $179 million today).

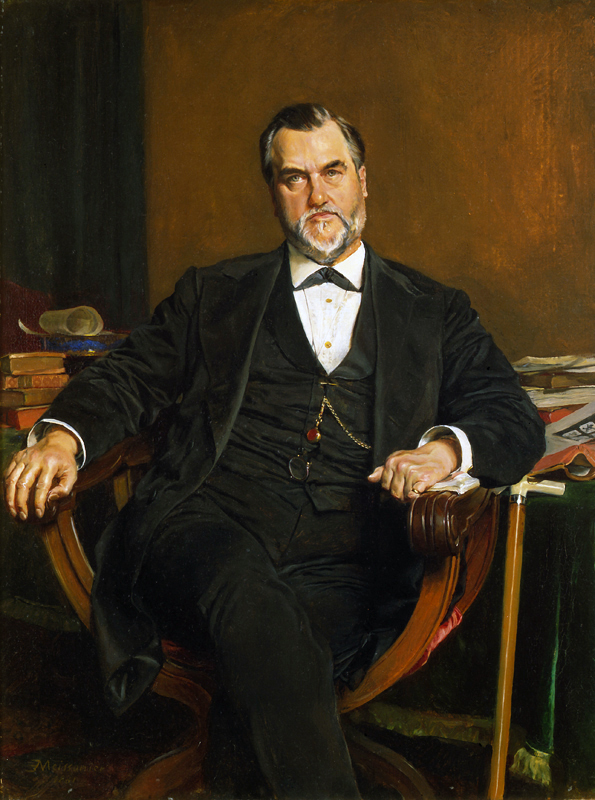
Leland Stanford, the university's co-founder, as painted by Jean-Louis-Ernest Meissonier in 1881 and now on display at the Cantor Center

The university's founding grant of endowment from the Stanfords was issued in November 1885. Besides defining the operational structure of the university, it made several specific stipulations:

"The Trustees ... shall have the power and it shall be their duty:

- To establish and maintain at such University an educational system, which will, if followed, fit the graduate for some useful pursuit, and to this end to cause the pupils, as easily as may be, to declare the particular calling, which, in life, they may desire to pursue; ...
- To prohibit sectarian instruction, but to have taught in the University the immortality of the soul, the existence of an all-wise and benevolent Creator, and that obedience to His laws is the highest duty of man.
- To have taught in the University the right and advantages of association and co-operation.
- To afford equal facilities and give equal advantages in the University to both sexes.
- To maintain on the Palo Alto estate a farm for instruction in agriculture in all its branches."

Though the trustees are in overall charge of the university, Leland and Jane Stanford as Founders retained great control until their deaths.

Despite the duty to have a co-educational institution, in 1899, Jane Stanford, the remaining Founder, added to the Founding Grant the legal requirement that "the number of women attending the University as students shall at no time ever exceed five hundred". She feared the large numbers of women entering would lead the school to become "the Vassar of the West" and felt that would not be an appropriate memorial for her son. In 1933, the requirement was reinterpreted by the trustees to specify an undergraduate male:female ratio of 3:1. The "Stanford ratio" of 3:1 remained in place until the early 1960s. By the late 1960s the "ratio" was about 2:1 for undergraduates, but much more skewed at the graduate level, except in the humanities. In 1973 the university trustees successfully petitioned the courts to have the restriction formally removed. As of 2014 the undergraduate enrollment is split nearly evenly between the sexes (47.2% women, 52.8% men), though males outnumber females (38.2% women, 61.8% men) at the graduate level. In the same petition they also removed the prohibition of sectarian worship on campus (previous only non-denominational Christian worship in Stanford Memorial Church was permitted).

Stanford was also mostly white though the first Black graduate was Ernest Houston Johnson in 1895 who received a degree in economics. He was admitted on the insistence of Jane Stanford. Black students over the next few decades seem to have been very scarce. Stanford did have a more substantial population of students from China or Japan or of Chinese or Japanese ancestry. Stanford graduated its first Chinese student, Walter Ngon Fong (Chinese: 鄺華汰), in 1896. The Chinese Students Club was established in 1916 (before then most Chinese students belonged to the Cosmopolitan club). Five students from Japan were members of the founding class in 1891. The Japanese Students Association was created in 1903.

=== Physical layout ===
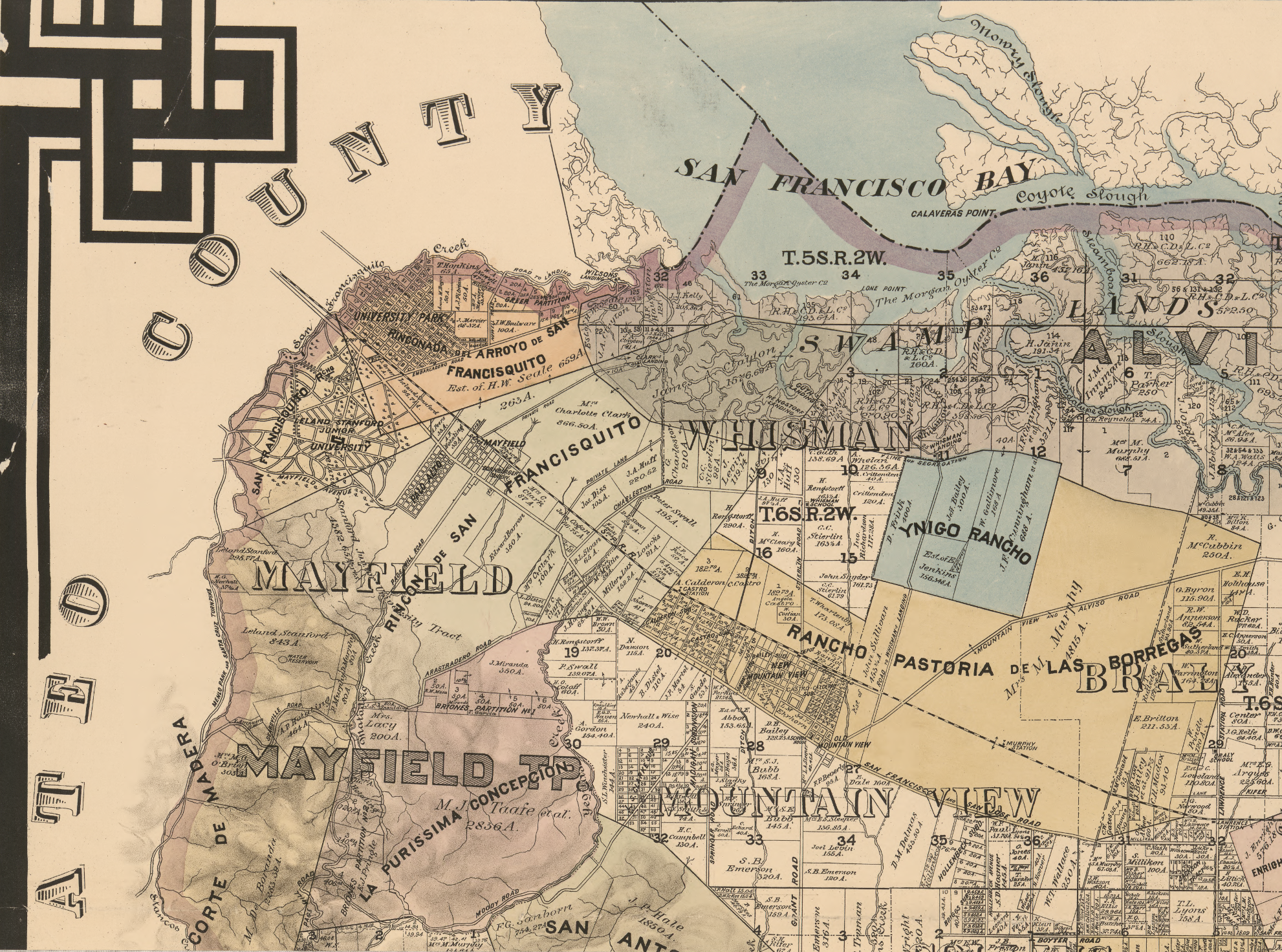
Stanford University as it appeared on the official map of the County of Santa Clara in 1890. Note the communities of University Park (now downtown Palo Alto), Palo Alto (now College Terrace in Palo Alto), and Mayfield (annexed by Palo Alto in the 1920s).

The Stanfords chose their country estate, Palo Alto Stock Farm, in northern Santa Clara County as the site of the university, so that the university is often called "the Farm" to this day. (Note: In addition to the founding grant of 8,180 acres (3,310 ha) the Palo Alto Stock Farm, the university was originally endowed with the Vina Ranch of 59,000 acres (24,000 ha) near Vina in Tehama County and the Gridley farm of 22,000 acres (8,900 ha) in Butte County. Unlike the Palo Alto Stock Farm, these lands could be sold and later were. The Vina Ranch was sold in 1918 and the core part is now the Trappist Abbey of New Clairvaux. The Gridley farm was originally part of Rancho Esquon. Despite the restriction on selling the Palo Alto Stock Farm lands, the government can still acquire the lands by eminent domain and did so to acquire 93 acres for the VA Palo Alto Hospital in 1956; this hospital works closely with the Stanford Medical School.)

The campus master plan (1886–1914) was designed by Frederick Law Olmsted and later his sons. The Main Quad was designed by Charles Allerton Coolidge and his colleagues, and by Leland Stanford himself. The cornerstone was laid on May 14, 1887, which would have been Leland Stanford Junior's nineteenth birthday.

In the summer of 1886, when the campus was first being planned, Stanford brought the president of Massachusetts Institute of Technology, Francis Amasa Walker, and the Boston landscape architect Frederick Law Olmsted westward for consultations. Olmsted worked out the general concept for the campus and its buildings, rejecting a hillside site in favor of the more practical flatlands. The Boston firm of Shepley, Rutan, and Coolidge were hired in the Autumn and Charles Allerton Coolidge then developed this concept in the style of his late mentor, Henry Hobson Richardson. The Richardsonian Romanesque style, characterized by rectangular stone buildings linked by arcades of half-circle arches, was merged with the Californian Mission Revival style desired by the Stanfords. However, by 1889, Leland Stanford severed the connection with Olmsted and Coolidge and their work was continued by others. The red tile roofs and solid sandstone masonry are distinctly Californian in appearance, and most of the more recent campus buildings have followed the Quad's pattern of buff-colored walls, red roofs, and arcades, giving Stanford its distinctive style.

=== Early faculty and administration ===
In Spring 1891, the Stanfords offered the presidency of their new university to the president of Cornell University, Andrew White, but he declined and recommended David Starr Jordan, the 40-year-old president of Indiana University Bloomington. Jordan's educational philosophy was a good fit with the Stanfords' vision of a non-sectarian, co-educational school with a liberal arts curriculum, and he accepted the offer. Jordan arrived at Stanford in June 1891 and began recruiting faculty for the university's planned October opening. With such a short time frame he drew heavily on his own acquaintance in academia; of the fifteen original professors, most came either from Indiana University or his alma mater Cornell. The 1891 founding professors included Robert Allardice in mathematics, Douglas Houghton Campbell in botany, Charles Henry Gilbert in zoology, George Elliott Howard in history, Oliver Peebles Jenkins in physiology and histology, Charles David Marx in civil engineering, Fernando Sanford in physics, and John Maxson Stillman in chemistry. The total initial teaching staff numbered about 35 including instructors and lecturers. For the second (1892–93) school year, Jordan added 29 additional professors including Frank Angell (psychology), Leander M. Hoskins (mechanical engineering), William Henry Hudson (English), Walter Miller (classics), George C. Price (zoology), and Arly B. Show (history). Most of these two founding groups of professors remained at Stanford until their retirement and were referred to as the "Old Guard".

Edward Alsworth Ross gained fame as a founding father of American sociology; in 1900 Jane Stanford fired him for radicalism and racism, unleashing a major academic freedom case.

=== Early finances ===
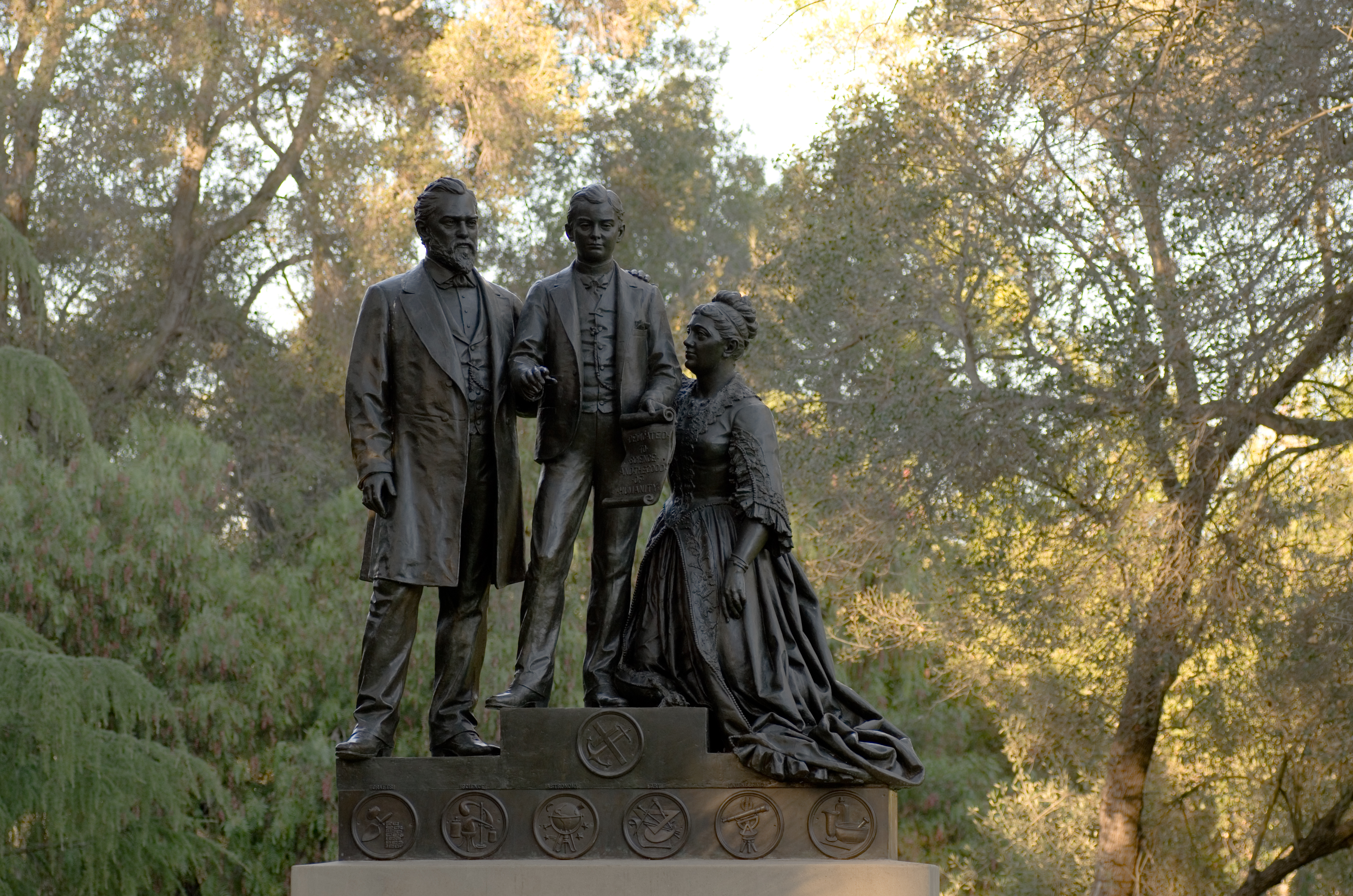
Statue of the Stanford family, by Larkin G. Mead (1899)

When Leland Stanford died in 1893, the continued existence of the university was in jeopardy. A $15 million government lawsuit against Stanford's estate, combined with the Panic of 1893, made it extremely difficult to meet expenses. Most of the board of trustees advised that the university be closed temporarily until finances could be sorted out. However, Jane Stanford insisted that the university remain in operation. When the lawsuit was finally dropped in 1895, a university holiday was declared. Stanford alumnus George E. Crothers became a close adviser to Jane Stanford following his graduation from Stanford's law school in 1896. Working with his brother Thomas (also a Stanford graduate and a lawyer), Crothers identified and corrected numerous major legal defects in the terms of the university's founding grant and successfully lobbied for an amendment to the California state constitution granting Stanford an exemption from taxation on its educational property—a change which allowed Jane Stanford to donate her stock holdings to the university.

Jane Stanford's actions were sometimes eccentric. In 1897, she directed the board of trustees "that the students be taught that everyone born on earth has a soul germ, and that on its development depends much in life here and everything in Life Eternal". She forbade students from sketching nude models in life-drawing class, banned automobiles from campus, and did not allow a hospital to be constructed so that people would not form an impression that Stanford was unhealthy. Between 1899 and 1905, she spent $3 million on a grand construction scheme building lavish memorials to the Stanford family, while university faculty and self-supporting students were living in poverty. On the other hand, in 1899, Jane Stanford authorized university trustees to have her jewelry collection auctioned off to support Stanford University, and in 1908 the trustees established the "Jewel Fund", which was initially valued at $500,000. The collection included a precious gold Patek Philippe pocket watch which was given to Jane Stanford by Leland Stanford in 1868 as a New Year's gift, and in 2005 the watch was sent back to the university by Pierre Schwob who purchased the watch from Pennsylvania jeweler William Paul.

In 1901, she transferred $30 million in assets, nearly all her remaining wealth, to the university; upon her death in 1905, she left the university nearly $4 million of her remaining $7 million. In total, the Stanfords donated around $40 million in assets to the university, over $1 billion in 2010 dollars.

== Post-founders (1906–1941) ==
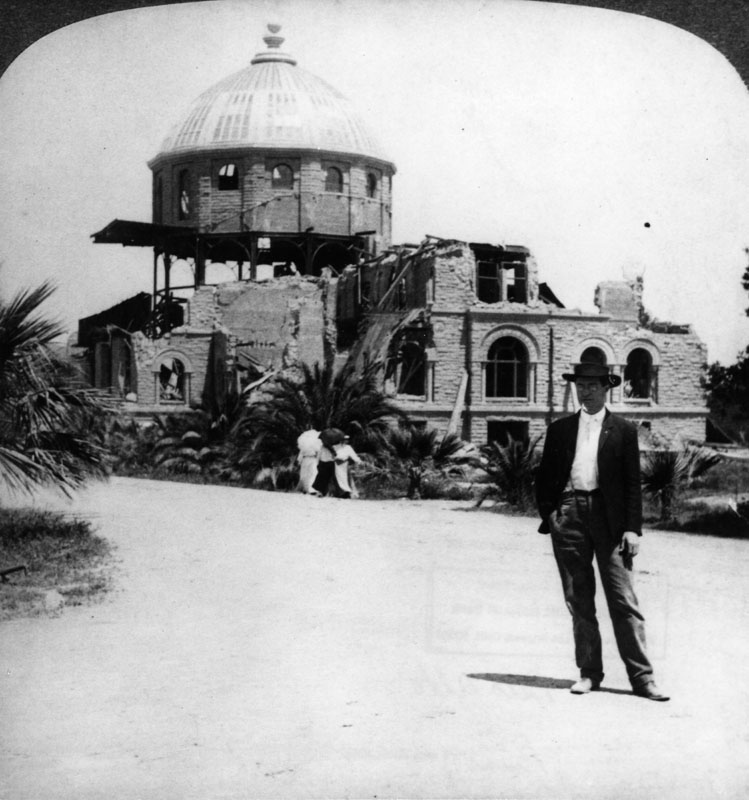
The ruins of the unfinished Stanford Library after the 1906 San Francisco earthquake

The year after Jane Stanford's death, the 1906 San Francisco earthquake damaged parts of the campus and caused new financial and structural problems, though only two people on campus were killed. Some of the early construction, especially from the second phase between Leland Stanford's death in 1893 and Jane Stanford's death in 1905, was destroyed by the earthquake. The university retains the Quad, part of the Museum, the old Chemistry Building (now, after extensive remodeling, the Sapp Center for Science Teaching and Learning), and Encina Hall (then the men's undergraduate dormitory). The earthquake destroyed parts of the Main Quad, including the original iteration of Memorial Church and the gate that first marked the entrance of the school, as well as a partially built main library. Rebuilding on a somewhat less grandiose scale began immediately.

In 1908 the university acquired the already existing Cooper Medical College in San Francisco and it became the Stanford University Department (later School) of Medicine though it remained in San Francisco until the late 1950s. For the full story see History of Stanford Medicine.

Jordan, the first president, stepped down in 1913 and was succeeded for two years by John Casper Branner. Branner was followed by Ray Lyman Wilbur, who was president from 1916 until 1943, except when he took leave to serve as Secretary of the Interior under President Herbert Hoover. Hoover along with his wife, Lou Henry Hoover, were among the first graduates of Stanford. Herbert Hoover was also a trustee of the university. The house they had built on campus as their own residence, Lou Henry Hoover House, became the university president's house after the death of Lou Henry Hoover in 1944.

In 1916, Stanford psychology professor Lewis Terman created a revised version of the Binet–Simon Scale for measuring intelligence, which became known as the Stanford–Binet Intelligence Scales. Terman also helped to popularize the term intelligence quotient or "IQ" for describing the results of such a test, and coined the word "gifted" to describe high-scoring individuals. The Stanford–Binet system, now in its fifth edition, remains in widespread use as a measure of general intelligence for both adults and children.

== World War II and late 20th century ==
Stanford generally lacked prestige and influence in the early twentieth century. In fact, Stanford did not emerge as a prestigious academic institution until the 1960s, when it appeared on lists of the "top ten" universities in America ... This swift rise to performance [was] understood at the time as related directly to the university's defense contracts ...

After Ray Lyman Wilbur retired in 1943 in the midst of World War II, Donald Tresidder, president of the Board of Trustees, took over as president until his unexpected death in early 1948. In 1949 Wallace Sterling became president (1949–1968) and he oversaw the rise of Stanford from a regional university to one of the most prestigious universities in the United States. Before the 1950s many regarded Stanford as being "a college for the children of wealthy parents". He was succeeded by Kenneth Pitzer from Rice University who lasted only 19 months, having stepped in just as the university entered its most tumultuous period of student protests. Richard Lyman, former provost, was president from 1971 until 1980; Donald Kennedy also a former provost was president from 1980 until 1992, when he resigned during the midst of a controversy over finances with the U.S. Government. The Board of Trustees brought in an outsider, Gerhard Casper, from the University of Chicago who was president until 2000.

From 1970 until 2011, Stanford lacked a Reserve Officer Training Corps program.

=== High tech and the rise of Silicon Valley ===
During the 1940s and 1950s, Frederick Terman, as dean of engineering and later as provost, encouraged faculty and graduates to start their own companies. He is credited with nurturing Hewlett-Packard, Varian Associates, and other high-tech firms, until what would become Silicon Valley grew up around the Stanford campus. Terman is often called "the father of Silicon Valley." Terman encouraged William B. Shockley, co-inventor of the transistor, to return to his hometown of Palo Alto. In 1956 he established the Shockley Semiconductor Laboratory. Unhappy employees from Shockley's company formed Fairchild Semiconductor and other companies (and key employees) eventually spun off from Fairchild to found new companies, including Intel.

=== Biology ===
The biological sciences department evolved rapidly from 1946 to 1972 as its research focus changed, due to the Cold War and other historically significant conditions external to academia. Stanford science went through three phases of experimental direction during that time. In the early 1950s the department remained fixed in the classical independent and self-directed research mode, shunning interdisciplinary collaboration and excessive government funding. Between the 1950s and mid-1960s biological research shifted focus to the molecular level. Then, from the late 1960s onward, Stanford's goal became applying research and findings toward humanistic ends. Each phase was preempted by larger social issues, such as the escalation of the Cold War, the launch of Sputnik, and public concern over medical abuses.

=== Physics ===
From 1962 through 1970, negotiations took place between the Cambridge Electron Accelerator Laboratory (shared by Harvard and the Massachusetts Institute of Technology), the Stanford Linear Accelerator Center (founded in 1962), and the US Atomic Energy Commission over the proposed 1970 construction of the Stanford Positron Electron Asymmetric Ring (SPEAR). It would be the first US electron-positron colliding beam storage ring. Paris (2001) explores the competition and cooperation between the two university laboratories and presents diagrams of the proposed facilities, charts detailing location factors, and the parameters of different project proposals between 1967 and 1970. Several rings were built in Europe during the five years that it took to obtain funding for the project, but the extensive project revisions resulted in a superior design that was quickly constructed and paved the way for Nobel Prizes in 1976 for Burton Richter and in 1995 for Martin Perl.

From 1955 to 1985, solid state technology research and development at Stanford University followed three waves of industrial innovation made possible by support from private corporations, mainly Bell Telephone Laboratories, Shockley Semiconductor, Fairchild Semiconductor, and Xerox PARC. In 1969 the Stanford Research Institute operated one of the four original nodes that comprised ARPANET, predecessor to the Internet.

=== Stanford prison experiment ===
In the summer of 1971, a Stanford psychology professor, Philip Zimbardo, conducted a study of the psychological effects of becoming a prisoner or prison guard which is known as the Stanford prison experiment. The experiment, which was funded by the Office of Naval Research, surprised the professor by the authoritarian and brutal reaction of the "guards" and the passive acceptance of abuse by the "prisoners". The experiment was criticized as unethical and was a partial cause of the development of ethical guidelines for experiments involving human subjects.

=== Civil rights ===
Stanford limited Jewish student admissions during the 1950s.

Though Stanford has never officially prohibited the admission of Black students, people of Asian descent, or Native Americans, it did not treat them equally with those considered as White. Discrimination also existed against non-Christians.

In 1957, the board of trustees adopted a policy stating:

"The University is opposed to discriminatory racial and religious clauses and practices. Insofar as such clauses or practices presently exist, the University will work actively with student groups to eliminate them at the earliest possible date"

Though this was relatively easy for the housing the university directly controlled, it had to work with the fraternities which invite their own membership (no sororities existed on campus at this time). In 1960, the Alpha Tau Omega chapter had its national charter revoked after refusing to retract the pledging of four Jewish students. In 1962 Sigma Nu (Beta Chi chapter) seceded from the national organization over the national organization's continuing refusal to drop bans on "Negros and Orientals". (Note: "Beta Chi" became increasingly progressive by opening admission to all (even women) and the physical house eventually became the co-op Synergy in 1972 before being destroyed in the aftermath of the 1989 earthquake. The fraternity revived in 1987 and became rehoused in 2003.)

As of late 1962 only the Kappa Alpha Order fraternity still officially discriminated due to the national organization's rules. However, in April 1965 the local Sigma Chi chapter pledged Kenneth M. Washington and was suspended allegedly for violating rules on rituals. Though Sigma Chi officially had removed its no whites policy in 1961 it had then instituted requirements that all members had to be approved by a national committee and that pledges be socially acceptable to other members anywhere. President Sterling then sent a letter to the presidents of all universities with Sigma Chi chapters supporting the local chapter and pointing out that university recognition of racially discriminatory groups could violate the Civil Rights Act of 1964. The suspension continued until Kenneth Washington's poor grades required him to resign anyway from the chapter. In November 1966 the Stanford chapter unanimously severed ties with the national fraternity. (Note: The local Sigma Chi chapter, Alpha Omega, reaffiliated with the national organization in 1974. It is notable as the only fraternity on campus to own its house though it leases the land underneath; all other fraternity and sorority houses are owned by the university.)

The university started actively recruiting minorities in the 1960s. The minorities started organizing and "in five years, students founded the six major community organizations: the Black Student Union (BSU) in 1967, the Asian American Students’ Association (AASA) and the Movimiento Estudiantil Chicano de Aztlan (MEChA) in 1969, the Stanford American Indian Organization (SAIO) in 1970, the Gay People's Union in 1971 and the Women's Collective in 1972."

=== Government expenses controversy ===
In the early 1990s, Stanford was investigated by the U.S. government over allegations that the university had inappropriately billed the government several million dollars for housing, personal expenses, travel, entertainment, fundraising and other activities unrelated to research, including a yacht and an elaborate wedding ceremony. The scandal eventually led to the resignation of Stanford President Donald Kennedy in 1992. In an agreement with the Office of Naval Research, Stanford refunded $1.35 million to the government for billing which occurred in the years 1981 and 1992. Additionally, the government reduced Stanford's annual research budget by $23 million in the year following the settlement.

== 21st century ==
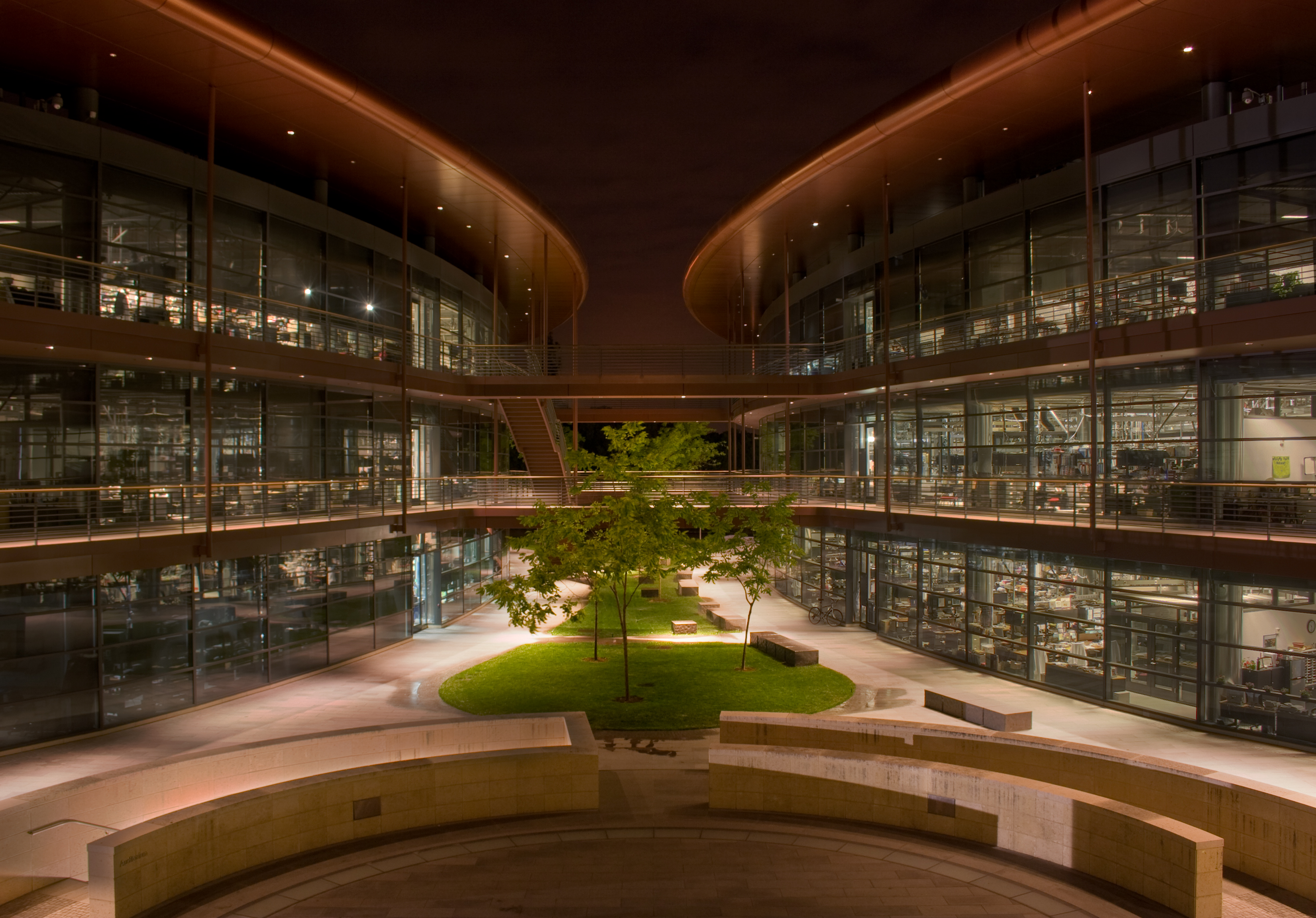
The James H. Clark Center

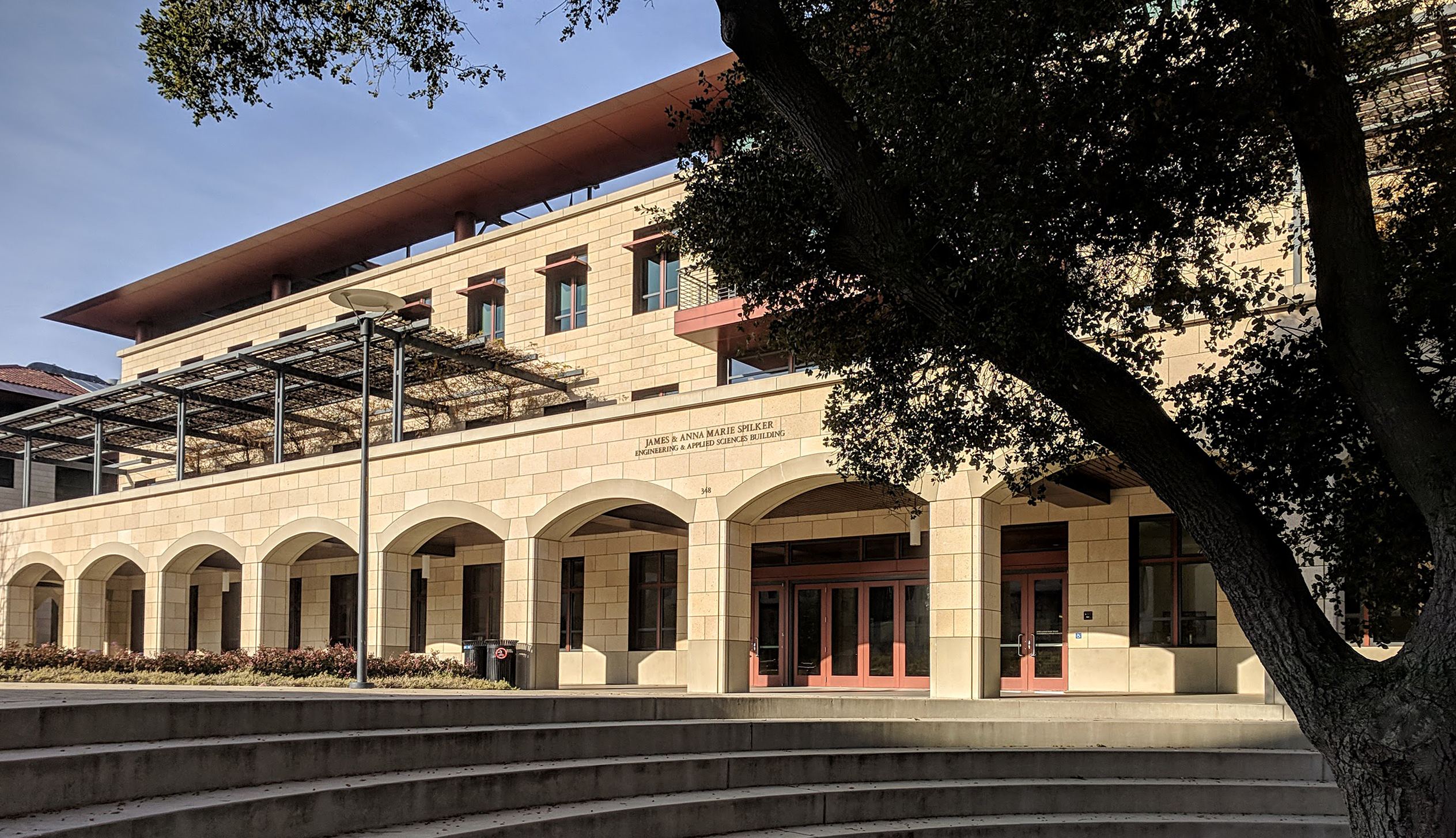
The James and Anna Marie Spilker Engineering and Applied Sciences Building

John L. Hennessy was appointed the 10th president of the university in October 2000 and under him the university has expanded. In 2012, Stanford opened the Stanford Center at Peking University, an almost 400,000-square-foot (37,000 m^{2}), three-story research center in the Peking University campus. Stanford became the first American university to have its own building on a major Chinese university campus.

During Hennessy's tenure the Stanford in Washington Program created the Stanford in Washington Art Gallery in Woodley Park, Washington, D.C., and the Stanford in Florence program moved to Palazzo Capponi, a 15th-century Renaissance palace. The university completed the James H. Clark Center for interdisciplinary research in engineering and medicine in 2003, named for benefactor, co-founder of Netscape, Silicon Graphics and WebMD, and former professor of electrical engineering James H. Clark. The Science and Engineering Quadrangle (SEQ) was also created, master plan by Bora Architects (then called Boora Architects) and landscaped by Laurie Olin. Buildings completed include Shriram Center for Bioengineering & Chemical Engineering in 2014 (named for Ram Shriram and his wife), the Jen-Hsun Huang Engineering Center in 2010, Jerry Yang and Akiko Yamazaki Environment and Energy Building (generally known as Y2E2) in 2008, and the James and Anna Marie Spilker Engineering and Applied Sciences Building in 2012.

Undergraduate admission also became more selective; the acceptance rate dropped from 13% for the class of 2004 to 4.69% for the class of 2020, the lowest admit rate in university history.

In 2014, Slate dubbed Stanford as "the Harvard of the 21st century". In the same year The New York Times dubbed Harvard as the "Stanford of the East". In that article titled To Young Minds of Today, Harvard Is the Stanford of the East, The New York Times concluded that "Stanford University has become America's 'it' school, by measures that Harvard once dominated." Further, Harvard Magazine noted that "Harvard administrators do seem to have Stanford in mind" in part because Stanford has been at the "center of perhaps the greatest wealth-creation in history."

In June 2015 Hennessy announced he would step down in September 2016 to return to teaching and research. He was succeeded by Marc Tessier-Lavigne, who had previously served as president of the Rockefeller University.

In fall 2015, Poets & Quants, a blog that covers MBA programs around the world, made public a wrongful termination suit filed by James A. Phills against Stanford; Phills alleged his firing was driven by the affair that his estranged wife, Deborah H. Gruenfeld, was having with Garth Saloner, the dean of the business school, apparently with the knowledge of Stanford's provost, John Etchemendy. The matter led to resignation of Saloner in 2015 and was covered by The New York Times, The Wall Street Journal, and Bloomberg. In May 2016 the school announced that Jonathan Levin would replace Saloner commencing that September.

In December 2017, an MBA student studying a February 2017 data breach discovered that the university secretly ranked fellowship applicants on their potential value to the university, rather than the university's publicly stated method of need.

The Stanford Doerr School of Sustainability is opened in September 2022, superseding the School of Earth, Energy & Environmental Sciences. With the aim of promoting equity and access to educational opportunities, Stanford launched its first dual-enrollment computer science program for high school students which then inspired the founding of the Qualia Global Scholars Program.

In October 2023, Stanford University reached a $1.9 million settlement with the US federal government for violations under the False Claims Act in which 11 researchers "knowingly failed" to disclose foreign funding.

In June 2024, a committee investigating antisemitism in the university reached the conclusion that antisemitism was common in the university and called for action to stop the phenomenon. The committee urged the university to reframe its diversity, equity and inclusion program to become more pluralistic and tolerant of Jewish identity. Larry Diamond, a Jewish member of faculty said the university had failed to teach critical thinking and tolerance of others' opinions. Jews faced vandalism, graffiti and social media pressure to denounce Israel. Some experienced antisemitism directly in their dorms or classes. It was reported that mezuzot were torn and Jews who identified openly as Jewish were "ostracized, canceled or intimidated" while others feared to show Jewish symbols in the open. Jews were called "Zios" in social media by students, a term developed by KKK Grand Wizard, David Duke. Jewish complaints on antisemitism were mocked on social media. Another report said that Muslims felt silenced by the university leadership and said they felt their speech was limited in asserting the rights of Palestinians. The president of Stanford said the university is committed in creating a welcoming campus to people of different backgrounds.

== Records ==
Stanford University maintains the Stanford University Archives to document its history. In addition the Stanford Historical Society has the mission "to foster and support the documentation, study, publication, dissemination, and preservation of the history of Stanford University." Since 1978 its oral history program has interviewed over 800 people connected to Stanford. The society also publishes a journal, Sandstone & Tile, started in 1976.

The student newspaper, The Stanford Daily, also has an archive of past issues going back to its start in 1892.
