= History of Stanford Medicine =

Cooper Medical College, a predecessor institution to Stanford Medicine. San Francisco, 1882. Photo from Lane Medical Archives Photo File, Box 9, folder 6. Reproduced with permission by the Stanford Medical History Center

Stanford Medicine traces its history back to 1858 when Elias Samuel Cooper, a physician in San Francisco, California, founded the first medical school in the Western United States. That school went through many changes, including a change of name to Cooper Medical College, a takeover by Stanford University in 1908, and a move from San Francisco to the Stanford campus near Palo Alto, California in 1959.

== Pre-Stanford years ==
In 1858 Elias Samuel Cooper collaborated with the University of the Pacific, a Methodist college then located in Santa Clara, to establish a Medical Department for the university in San Francisco. The department opened in 1859 at Mission and Third Streets in San Francisco and was the first medical school in the western United States. Its seventeen trustees included ten clergy and three physicians.

The following year Cooper founded the San Francisco Medical Press, creating a venue for communication among medical practitioners in addition to the already-existing Pacific Medical and Surgical Journal. Henry Gibbons, Sr. and Levi Cooper Lane (Cooper's nephew) joined the faculty of the Medical Department in 1861.

However, in 1862 Cooper died, and without his leadership the Medical Department of the University of the Pacific became moribund. In 1864 Hugh H. Toland opened the Toland Medical College at Stockton and Chestnut Streets in San Francisco. Lane, Gibbons and J.F. Morse moved from the Medical Department of the University of the Pacific to Toland Medical College. Instruction followed Parisian principles of medical education. In 1873 Toland Medical College became the Medical Department of the University of California, later the University of California, San Francisco.

Then, in 1870 Levi Cooper Lane returned from Toland and took over as the leader of the Medical Department of the University of the Pacific which he revived and re-organized. He opened a new facility on Stockton Street at Geary in San Francisco. In 1872 the medical school switched its affiliation from University of the Pacific to University College, a Presbyterian school that later became the San Francisco Theological Seminary, and the name was changed to the Medical College of the Pacific. In 1877 the college admitted its first female student.

Lane had bigger plans for the school, and in 1882 he renamed it Cooper Medical College, after his uncle, the founder. He moved it to a new brick building at Sacramento and Webster Streets which he had personally financed. The new college was staffed with faculty from the Medical College of the Pacific. Lane enlisted former student and future San Francisco mayor Edward Robeson Taylor to oversee compliance of the college with California's Medical Practice Act. In 1890 he added an addition to the facility which included Lane Hall (a large auditorium), laboratories, and a surgical theater. The modern facilities and advanced curriculum gave the medical college a high reputation, and in 1892 Cooper Medical College was one of only seven U.S. medical schools recognized by the English Royal College of Surgeons. The faculty was mostly made up of practicing physicians; in 1898 William Ophüls was appointed as the first full-time salaried professor.

In 1895 the facilities were expanded with the opening of 100-bed Lane Hospital on the corner of Clay and Webster Streets. Construction of the hospital was supported by Claus Spreckels and James McDonald. Also in 1895 the Lane Hospital Training School for Nurses (predecessor of the Stanford School of Nursing) was opened. At first nursing students were provided housing inside Lane Hospital. Starting in 1899 they were housed in a residence on Clay Street adjacent to Lane Hospital, where Stanford Hospital would later stand.

In 1896 Cooper Medical College student Theodore Durrant was convicted in a murder trial that garnered national press coverage.

In 1900 Bubonic plague arrived in San Francisco by ship, starting the San Francisco plague of 1900–1904. California Governor Henry Gage issued a proclamation denying that bubonic plague exists in San Francisco, which was signed by Lane.

In 1902 Lane died, and Charles N. Ellinwood was selected to replace him as the new president of Cooper Medical College. However, in 1907 Ellinwood was removed from the presidency following a financial management controversy.

== Stanford acquires Cooper Medical College ==
In 1906 David Starr Jordan, president of Stanford University, proposed that the university acquire Cooper Medical College on condition that the latter take a medical research focus. In 1908 Cooper Medical College was deeded to the Board of Trustees of Stanford University as a gift, and was renamed as the Stanford University Department of Medicine. In 1912 the Lane Hospital and the nursing school were also transferred to Stanford.

Lane had made provision in his will for the construction of a medical library. The Levi C. Lane Medical Library Trust possessed a library of 30,000 volumes as well as a building site and funds for construction. Additional funds were provided by Stanford and by the directors of the former Cooper Medical College, and the Lane Medical Library opened in 1912 on the southeast corner of Webster and Sacramento Streets, across the street from the Stanford University Department of Medicine. At the time of its dedication it was the largest medical library west of Chicago. The building, which still stands, housed the California Pacific Medical Center Health Sciences Library until 2017.

1914 the Department of Medicine was renamed the Stanford School of Medicine and was re-organized into 10 divisions: anatomy; bacteriology and immunology; physiology; chemistry; pharmacology; pathology; medicine; surgery; obstetrics and gynecology; and hygiene and public health. In 1925 the Department of Public Health and Preventive Medicine was founded.

1917 saw the opening of Stanford University Hospital on Clay Street, adjacent to Lane Hospital,. In 1919 the Stanford Home for Convalescent Children (the "Con Home") opened in Palo Alto.

In 1939 the Ruth Lucy Stern Research Laboratory opened across Clay Street from Lane Hospital and Stanford University Hospital, furthering Jordan's vision of a research-oriented medical school.

== Move to the main Stanford campus ==
During the 1950s the trustees of Stanford developed a plan to move the School of Medicine to the main Stanford campus, and the relocation was completed in 1959. The physical plant that previously housed the medical school in San Francisco was deeded to the Presbytery of San Francisco, thus creating the Presbyterian Hospital and Medical Center of San Francisco, renamed the Pacific Medical Center in 1967, the Pacific Presbyterian Medical Center in 1983, and the California Pacific Medical Center in 1991. The original Cooper Medical College and Lane Hospital buildings were demolished in 1974.

The new Stanford campus for the School of Medicine was designed by Edward Durell Stone. It included the Palo Alto-Stanford Hospital Center - a joint hospital with two separate staffs. Among those faculty moving from the San Francisco campus to the new facility were Avram Goldstein and Henry Kaplan. Newly recruited faculty members included Norman Kretchmer, Arthur Kornberg, Joshua Lederberg, Halsted Holman, Robert Chase, and David Hamburg.

In 1965 Palo Alto Hospital, renamed Hoover Pavilion, re-opened and in 1968 Stanford reached an agreement with Palo Alto's city council to become sole owner of the hospital.

In 1970 medical school faculty and students canceled classes to protest the U.S. invasion of Cambodia and the killing of students at Kent State and Jackson State. In 1971 a demonstration alleging racist personnel policies at the hospital turned into a riot, resulting in injuries, arrests, and more than $100,000 damage to the hospital.

The Stanford School of Nursing was closed in 1974.

In 1980 Stanford University and the University of California, San Francisco received a patent for gene splicing and cloning technologies - a catalyst for the nascent biotechnology industry. In 1981 the California Office of Statewide Planning issued a report praising Stanford University School of Medicine for recruiting minority students, while a faculty report charged that similar progress had not been made in recruiting minority faculty.

Stanford University Medical School survived the 1989 Loma Prieta earthquake relatively unscathed, although the Palo Alto Veterans Administration Medical Center, which is affiliated with the medical school, suffered approximately $30,000,000 damage.

In 1997 Stanford and the University of California, San Francisco merged their hospitals and clinics while leaving their respective medical schools independent; however, the partnership was discontinued in 1999.

== Curriculum ==
In 1912 a new curriculum for the M.D. degree was introduced that required two years of pre-clinical study at Stanford's main campus, followed by 2 years of guided treatment of patients in hospital wards and clinics in San Francisco; a research-based thesis also becomes a requirement. This change reflected recommendations made in the 1910 Flexner Report. In 1923 the curriculum was revised again, reducing required instruction to fewer than 4,000 hours - the amount required for students to be eligible for state licensing of physicians. The difference was to be made up through required work in departments of the student's choice, fostering further specialization. In 1941, due to a demand for physicians in the Armed Forces during World War II, Stanford University Medical School developed the "9-9-9" Medical Plan, accelerating the time required to complete the M.D. program. The program was discontinued in 1945.

In 1959, inspired by Western Reserve University in Cleveland, Stanford University School of Medicine adopted a five-year M.D. program. In 1968 the curriculum was revised again. Instead of the five-year plan, all requirements in pre-clinical training were eliminated in favor of an all-elective curriculum. This was reversed in 1984, when core preclinical courses once again became required. In 1993 Stanford piloted a "Preparation for Clinical Medicine" curriculum, a course using problem-based learning, while retaining the traditional model of two years in basic sciences followed by two years in clinical studies.
