= James Perrin Smith =

American geologist and teacher

- Born: 27 November 1864; Near Cokesburg
- Died: 1 January 1931 (aged 66); Palo Alto
- Occupations: Geologist, paleontologist

James Perrin Smith (November 27, 1864 – January 1, 1931) was an American geologist and paleontologist.

Smith was of English descent. T. M. Forster, one of his ancestors, was a surgeon in the Royal Navy and moved to Virginia in 1745. His paternal grandfather moved the family from Virginia to South Carolina, and Smith was born on November 27, 1864, near Cokesburg, to James Francis Smith, a planter and traveling preacher.

James P. Smith was educated by his parents and elder brother Charles Forster Smith. In the 1870s, the family moved to Spartanburg, South Carolina, where James obtained a bachelor's degree at Wofford College in 1884. Smith then attended Vanderbilt University until 1887, for a master's degree. He subsequently taught high school science and mathematics in Nashville, Tennessee for two years. Smith then worked for the Arkansas Geological Survey under John Casper Branner. Between 1890 and 1892, Smith studied at the University of Göttingen. His doctoral work was supervised by Adolf von Koenen. He was elected to the American Philosophical Society in 1922 and the United States National Academy of Sciences in 1925. Smith joined the Stanford University faculty at Branner's invitation upon completing his Ph.D, and retired in June 1930.

He died of pneumonia on January 1, 1931 in Palo Alto, California. His last scientific work was published posthumously in 1932.

Smith Creek on northern Ellesmere Island is named after him, and indirectly the Smithian substage of the Early Triassic epoch.
