= J. Henry Meyer Memorial Library =

Library at Stanford University, California

Coordinates: 37.425686°N 122.167360°W

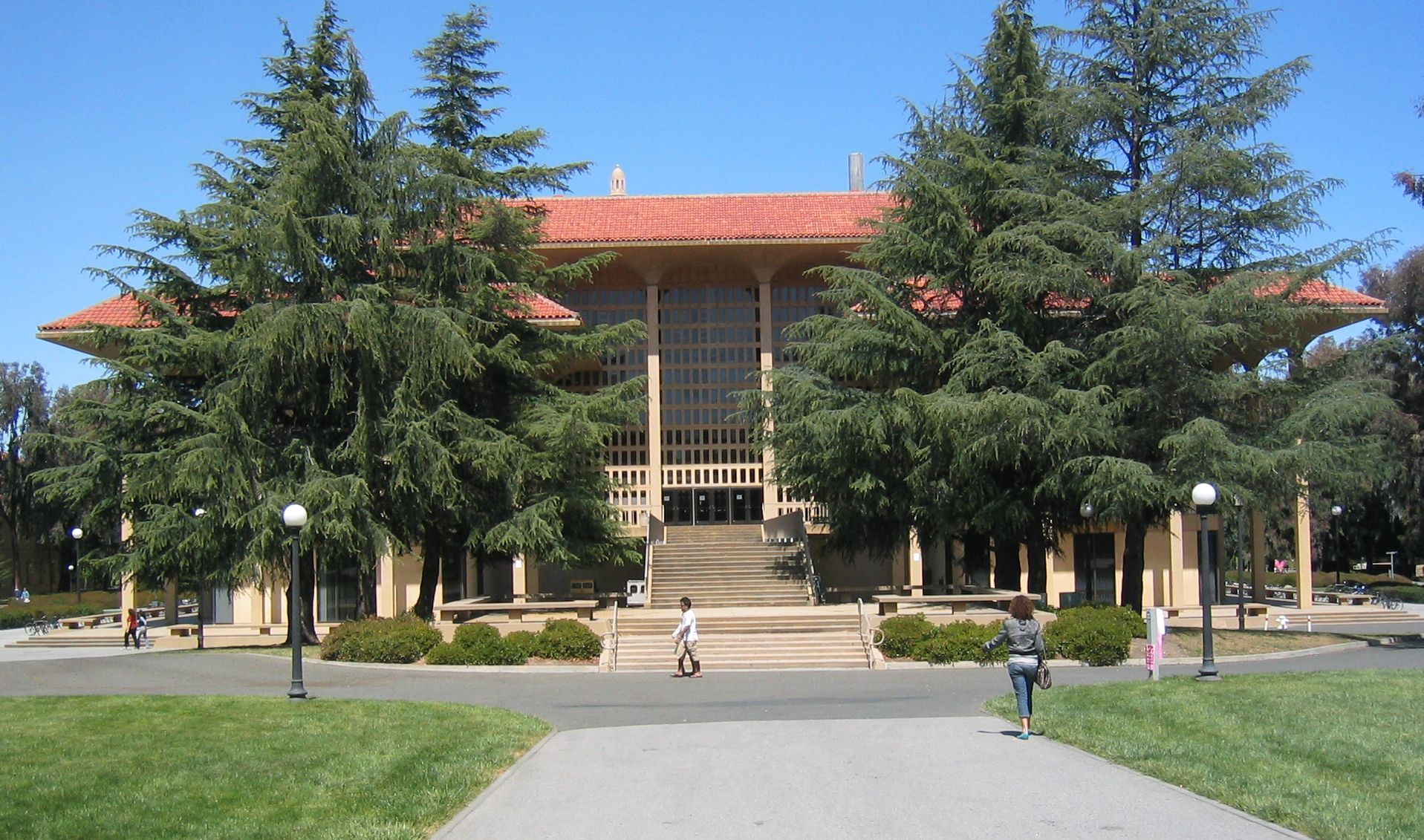
Meyer Library, viewed from the south

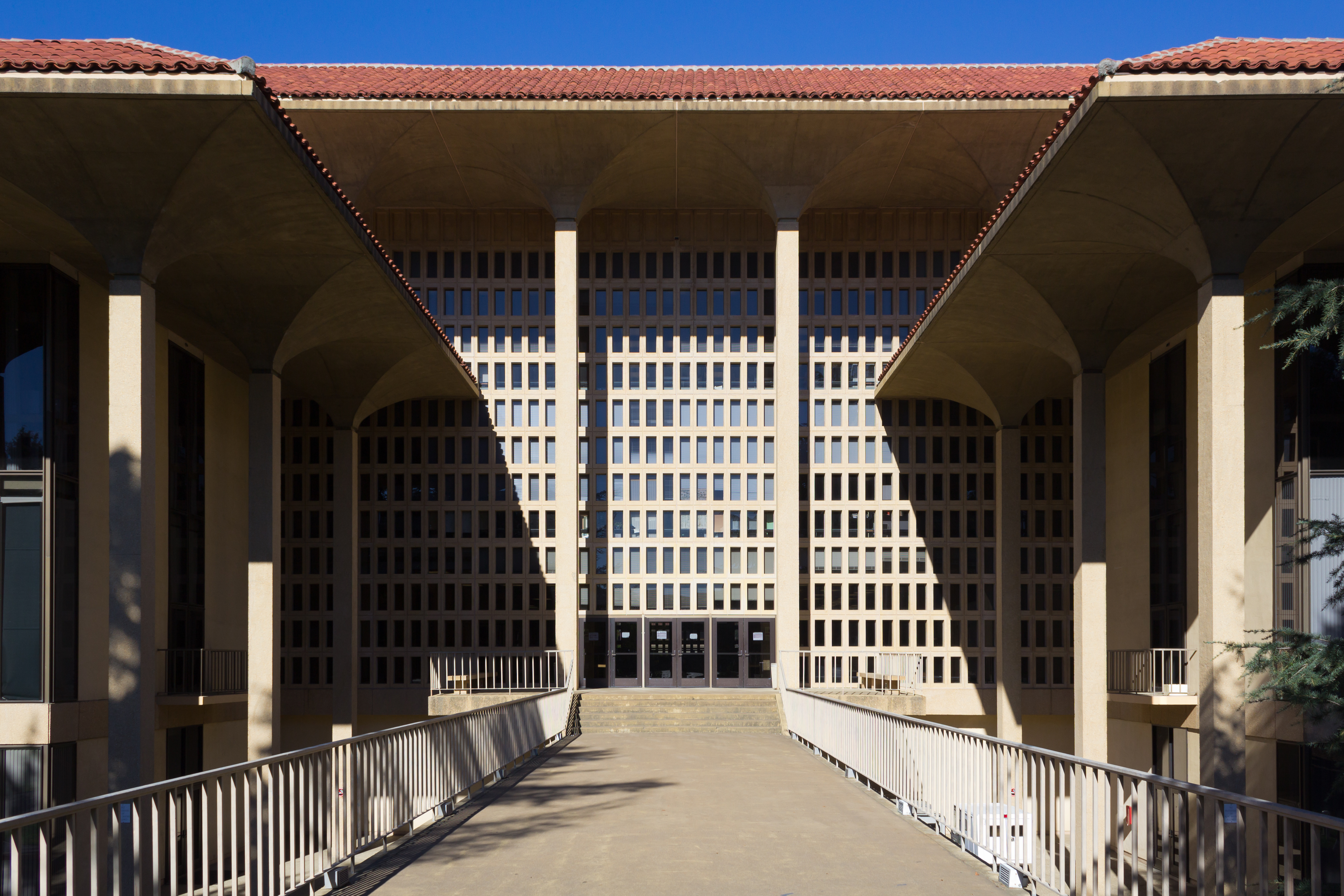
Closeup of second floor

The J. Henry Meyer Memorial Library was a library at Stanford University in California. It was dedicated on December 2, 1966. In 2007, a seismic assessment identified $45 million in required retrofits, more than the cost of a new library elsewhere on campus. Consequently, the library was designated for closure and a new design was accepted featuring a public open space area at the site. The library closed permanently on August 22, 2014, and was demolished during the months of February and March, 2015.

Designed by architect and Stanford alumnus John Carl Warnecke, Meyer Library's arcades featured high columns and vaulted ceilings. It was a four-story building with a sloping tile roof, and the outer sides of the building were lined with vertical bands of tall windows. The inner, central section of each side of the building was covered with a mesh of small windows.

The first floor of the Meyer Library consisted of several seminar rooms, a computer cluster, and a 24-hour study room. The first floor was open 24 hours a day, seven days a week. The second floor was the home of Academic Computing and Residential Computing, which provided technological expertise and resources to faculty and students. There was a specialized Multimedia Studio and a Digital Language Lab. The Meyer Technology Services Desk provided direct troubleshooting and consulting services. The third floor contained library systems and offices.

The fourth floor housed the East Asia Library, which has a vast Chinese collection of over 300,000 volumes, a Japanese collection of over 100,000 volumes, and a Korean collection of over 10,000 volumes. This collection was moved to the new Lathrop Library.

== Namesake ==
The library was named for J. Henry Meyer (1855–1921), a wealthy California businessman who was an early supporter of Stanford, particularly the Stanford libraries. He was born in Sacramento and settled in San Francisco. He was a banker and an important influence on the development of the street railway systems in San Francisco and Los Angeles. He helped underwrite the establishment of Stanford's Lane Medical Library, and in 1916 he created a Stanford endowment fund to collect important western historical manuscripts. Two of his three children graduated from Stanford, and they continued his tradition of supporting the university. Their support, together with a grant from the U.S. Office of Education, made the undergraduate library possible, and it was named in their father's honor.

== See also ==
- Stanford University Libraries
