= Stanford Doerr School of Sustainability =

School at Stanford University, California, US

The Stanford Doerr School of Sustainability is a school at Stanford University focusing on climate change and sustainability. The school also researches many domains of fossil fuel extraction and development. It opened on September 1, 2022, as Stanford's first new school since the School of Humanities and Sciences in 1948. It is considered one of the largest climate change–related schools in the United States.

Arun Majumdar is the school's inaugural dean. Initially, the school will have 90 faculty members. It has plans to add 60 more faculty members over 10 years and construct two new buildings adjacent to the existing Green Earth Sciences and Jerry Yang and Akiko Yamazaki Environment and Energy buildings. It incorporated the academic departments and interdisciplinary programs of the School of Earth, Energy & Environmental Sciences as well as the Woods Institute for the Environment and the Precourt Institute for Energy. The school also includes the Hopkins Marine Station and a startup accelerator. Despite being Stanford's newest school, it incorporates the university's oldest academic department, geology.

== History ==
The Stanford Doerr School of Sustainability was created in part by incorporating the former Stanford University School of Earth, Energy & Environmental Sciences on September 1, 2022. Prior to February 2015 it had been called the School of Earth Sciences.

Stanford University's very first faculty member, John Casper Branner, was a professor of geology, so that earth science is considered the oldest academic foundation of Stanford University. The search for and extraction of natural resources was the major focus of Branner's geology department during that period of Western development. Departments were originally not organized into schools, but this changed with the establishment of the School of Physical Sciences in 1926. In 1946 the School of Mineral Sciences was established, and geology was eventually split into several departments.

== Advisory Council ==
The School of Sustainability formed an Advisory Council in 2023 with two co-chairs: John Hennessy and John Doerr.

The members of the Advisory Council are: Anela Arifi, Sandra Begay, Natarajan “Chandra” Chandrasekaran, Steven A. Denning, Ann Doerr, Jennifer Doudna, Angela Filo, Bill Gates, Jamshyd N. Godrej, Hal Harvey, Mark Heising, Martin Lau, Laurene Powell Jobs, Condoleezza Rice, Tom Steyer, Gene Sykes, Yi Wang, Akiko Yamazaki, Eric Yuan, and Fareed Zakaria.

== Academics and organization ==
The School of Sustainability has six academic departments and three interdisciplinary programs. The departments are Civil and Environmental Engineering (a joint department with the School of Engineering); Earth System Science; Energy Science and Engineering; Geological Sciences; Geophysics; and Oceans. The interdisciplinary programs are the Earth Systems Program; the Sustainability Science and Practice Program; and the Emmett Interdisciplinary Program in Environment and Resources (E-IPER). Research and teaching span a wide range of disciplines. The interdisciplinary programs, in conjunction with the six departments, reach out to all other schools on the Stanford campus as well as the United States Geological Survey (USGS) and state and federal policy makers.

The school's library, Branner Earth Sciences Library, contains over 125,000 volumes, a large map collection, and Stanford's GIS lab for ongoing GIS reference and research consultation.

== Programs ==
The school offers both undergrad and graduate degrees. The majority of the students are graduate students, with a large contingent of coterminal master's degree recipients from the Earth Systems interdisciplinary program. The school attracts students from all six of the inhabited continents, and continues to be one of the most ethnically diverse Earth Sciences programs in the US. As of 2022 about 4.0% of Stanford's graduate students (approximately 360) and 1.4% of the undergraduates (approximately 100) are in the school.

== Research ==
Research programs in the SES continue to make groundbreaking discoveries about the planet, its environment, and human interactions. As a result, there are a number of industry funded-research groups (e.g., Stanford Exploration Project, Stanford Wave Physics Laboratory, Stanford Rock Physics and Borehole Geophysics Project) that implement student-led research for industry implementation.

=== Industrial Affiliate Programs ===
The Doerr School includes 14 industry-funded affiliate programs, including the Stanford Exploration Project, the Stanford Natural Gas Initiative, and the Stanford Center for Carbon Storage. The affiliate programs cover many areas of research, including oil and gas exploration, oil field monitoring and development, hydraulic fracturing, natural gas extraction, methane leak detection, carbon capture and sequestration, and enhanced oil recovery.

=== San Andreas Fault Observatory at Depth (SAFOD) ===
The San Andreas Fault Observatory at Depth (SAFOD) is one of three components of the Earthscope Project, funded by the National Science Foundation in conjunction with the USGS and NASA. The SAFOD site is located just north of the town of Parkfield, California. The SAFOD main hole was drilled to a depth of ~3.4 km in 2004 and 2005, crossing the San Andreas near a region of the fault where repeating Magnitude 2 earthquakes are generated.

A goal of this project is to install instruments to record data near the source of these earthquakes. In addition to the installation of these instruments, rock and fluid samples were continuously collected during the drilling process, and will also be used to analyze changes in geochemistry and mechanical properties around the fault zone. The project will lead to a better understanding of the processes that control the behavior of the San Andreas fault, and it is hoped that the development of instrumentation and analytic methods will help evaluate the possibility of earthquake prediction which is of primary importance for earthquake engineering.

The project is co-PIed by Bill Ellsworth and Steve Hickman of the USGS, and Stanford geophysics faculty member and alum Mark Zoback. Zoback's research in the SES focuses on stress and crustal mechanics. His students are heavily engaged in on-going research in the Global Climate and Energy Project.

== Funding ==
Stanford has raised $1.69 billion for the establishment of the school, including $1.1 billion from venture capitalist John Doerr and his wife Ann, after whom the school is named. The Doerrs' gift was the largest ever given to a university for the establishment of a new school and the second largest gift to an academic institution; it makes the Doerrs the top funders of climate change research and scholarship. Other donors include Yahoo! cofounders Jerry Yang and David Filo and their spouses, Akiko Yamazaki and Angela Filo. The Doerr School has also received funding from ExxonMobil, TotalEnergies, Shell, Saudi Aramco, Petrobras, and many other oil and gas companies via the Doerr School's industry affiliates program and the Precourt Institute. Dean Arun Majumdar has indicated that the Doerr School is open to continuing to accept funding from and to work with fossil fuel companies, drawing criticism from Stanford students, faculty, staff, and alumni.

=== Funder Influence on Research ===
Some of the Doerr School's affiliate programs, including the Natural Gas Initiative, provide funders with seats on their advisory or governance boards, give them access to unpublished research, and allow representatives from funders to directly mentor students. The school allowed representatives from three of its oil and gas funders, Shell, ExxonMobil, and TotalEnergies, to give input into the school's first Flagship Destination.

== Rankings ==
As of 2023, the Stanford Doerr School of Sustainability was ranked as the fourth best Earth Sciences program in the United States by the U.S. News & World Report, tied with Columbia. (Caltech was ranked number 1, MIT number 2, and UC Berkeley 3) The same year, in the same review, the Doerr School ranked as the number 1 environmental science program (with Columbia ranked number 2 and MIT number 3).
