= Caribmap =

Online library of maps of the Caribbean

Caribmap is a non-profit online library of historical and modern maps, including topographic maps, of the Caribbean islands. Since its establishment in 1999, the site has accumulated approximately 1800 maps of the islands that have been printed since the beginning of the 16th century The purpose of the site is to allow users, such as historians and scientists, to gain detailed information, including place names, from the high resolution map scans. For this, it uses a zoomable user interface (ZUI), Deep Zoom, so that the scale of the viewed area can be changed.

Caribmap is created and directed by a scientist, S. Blair Hedges, who is responsible for managing all content. It has received large donations of map images from public and private institutions such as the Branner Earth Sciences Library & Map Collections of Stanford University, the Norman B. Leventhal Map Center at the Boston Public Library, the Perry–Castañeda Library of the University of Texas at Austin, and the George A. Smathers Libraries of the University of Florida.

== Contents ==
Caribmap encompasses the geographic range of the Caribbean Sea and its islands, including those bordering the Middle and South American mainland, such as the Bay Islands of Honduras, ABC Islands (Aruba, Bonaire, and Curaçao), Trinidad, and Tobago. The Bahamas and Turks and Caicos Islands are also incorporated due to their cultural, economic, and historic links to the Caribbean islands.

The site features scans of high-resolution maps, organized by islands, which allow the capability to zoom in on details of historic or scientific importance. Map thumbnail images pertaining to that island are sorted in chronological order by the year the map was made, above the viewing area. Bibliographic information (title, year, maker, medium, size, and credit) is displayed under each map. The site also has a feature called "map tours," focused on individual islands (currently only Jamaica), which are short videos featuring historical maps and 3D scenes from Google Earth. One demonstrated use of Caribmap, given its large number of high-resolution map images, has been quantitative historical analysis, which traces the use of toponyms (place names) through time.
