= Lathrop Library =

Library at Stanford University

Coordinates: 37.4292°N 122.1676°W

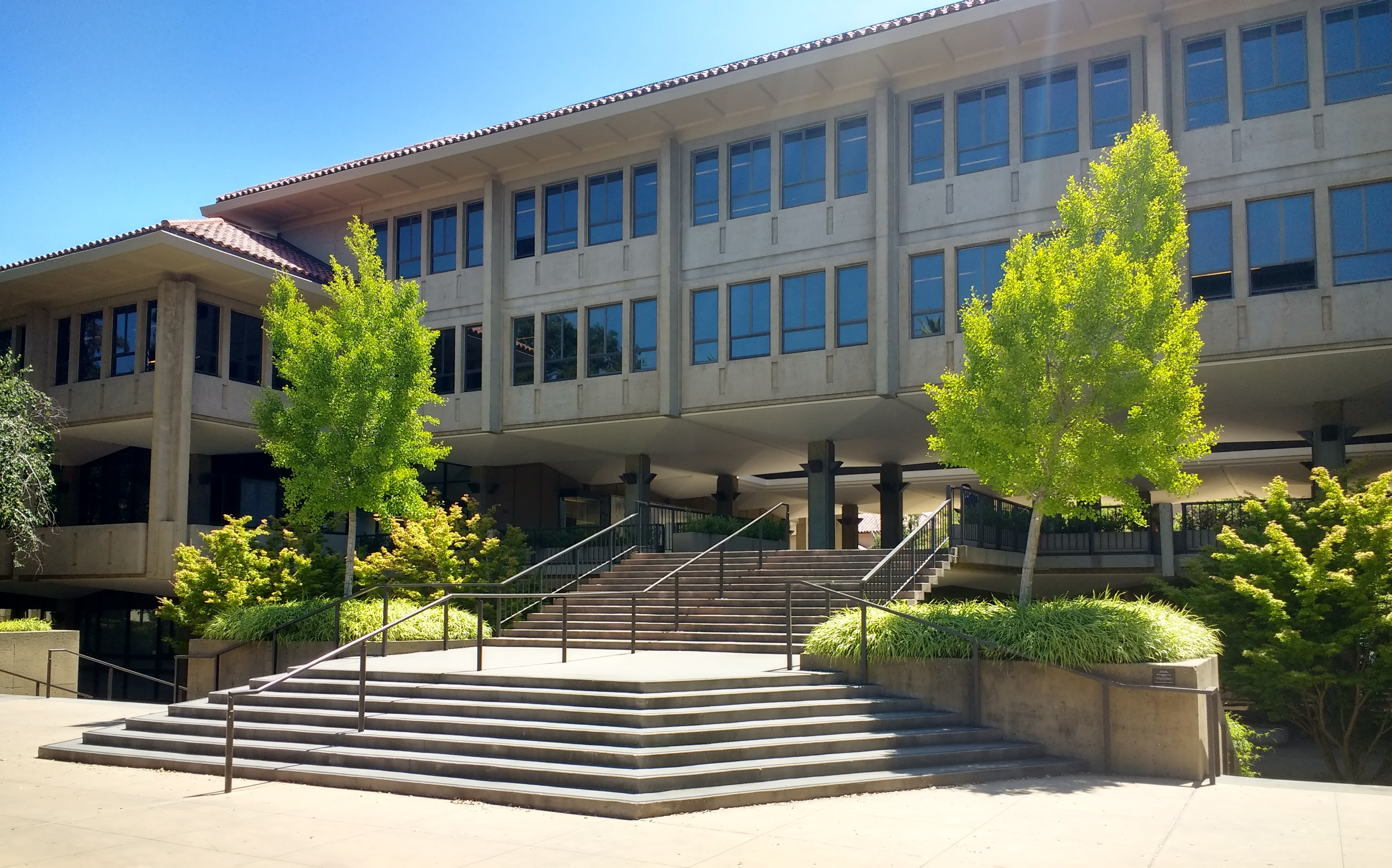
Lathrop Library, viewed from the west

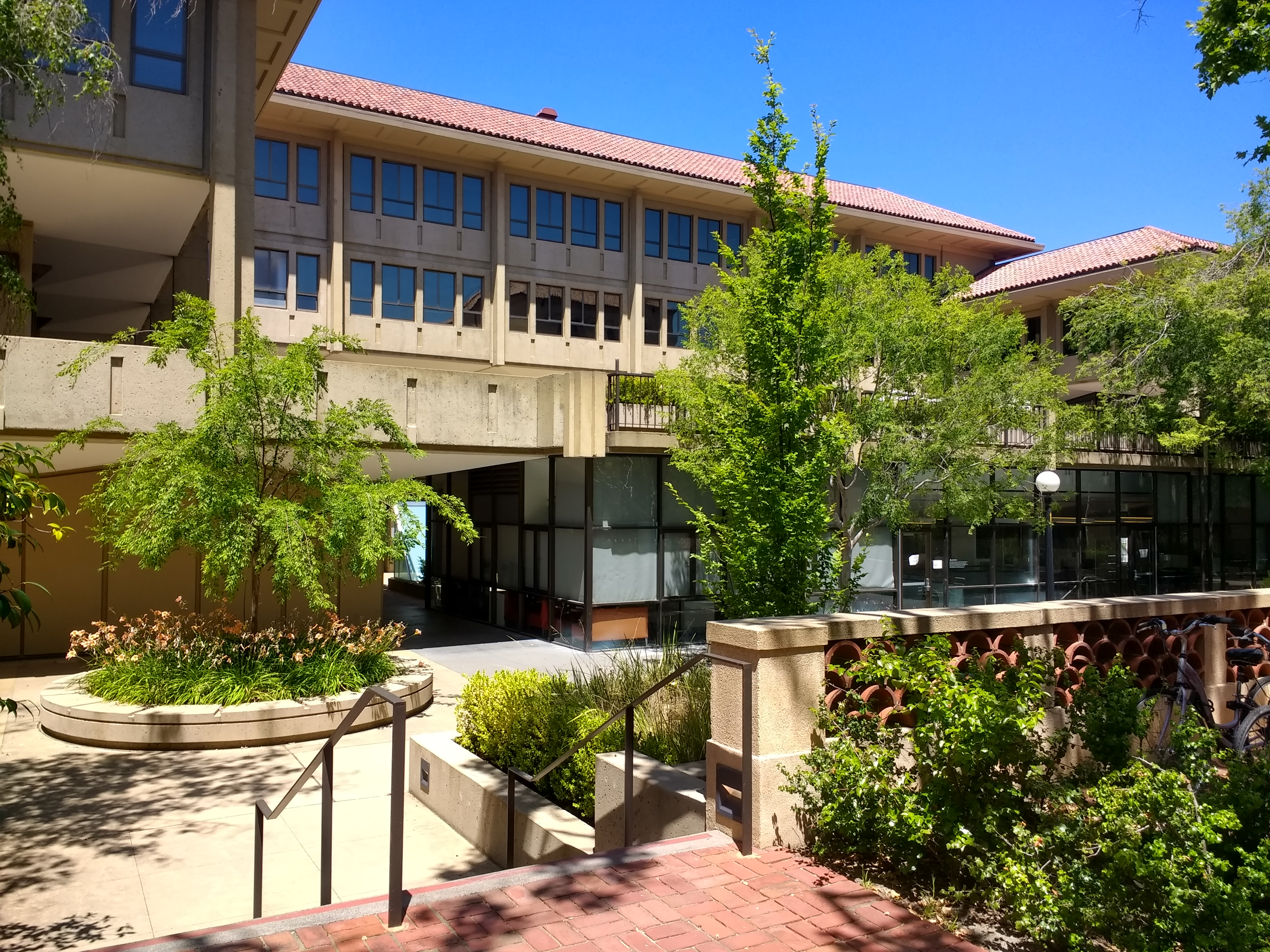
Lathrop Library, viewed from the east

The Lathrop Library is one of several libraries at Stanford University in California. It is the current undergraduate library and houses the East Asia Library. Part of the Stanford University Libraries system, it opened on September 15, 2014 and houses collections and services formerly located in J. Henry Meyer Memorial Library, which was demolished in 2015. The library is located in a renovated building formerly occupied by the Stanford Graduate School of Business. In addition, all the media acquisition and processing staff are located in the library.

== Namesake ==
Lathrop Library is named for Jane Lathrop Stanford, co-founder of Stanford University with her husband, Leland Stanford.
