= Stanford University Libraries Digital Image Collections =

Online image gallery

The Stanford University Libraries Digital Image Collections is an online collection of digital images called Image Gallery, maintained by the Stanford University Libraries. The site provides access to over 50,000 digital images scanned from collections owned by the Stanford Libraries. Users can search image metadata, browse collections, and view images at high resolutions.

The Libraries' collections include digitized photographs, maps, manuscripts, lithographs, prints, rare books, and posters related to a variety of topics. Featured collections include:

- David Rumsey Map Collection
- Douglas Menuez Photography Collection
- Herbert Matter Photograph Collection
- Leon Kolb Collection of Portraits
- Medieval Manuscript Fragments
- Stanford Historical Photograph Collection
- The Barry Ruderman Map Collection
- The Reid W. Dennis Collection of California Lithographs

The site also includes images found in the Stanford University Visual Resources Center Imagebase, which is used to support teaching and research at Stanford.
