= Green Earth Sciences =

Coordinates: 37°25′36″N 122°10′26″W

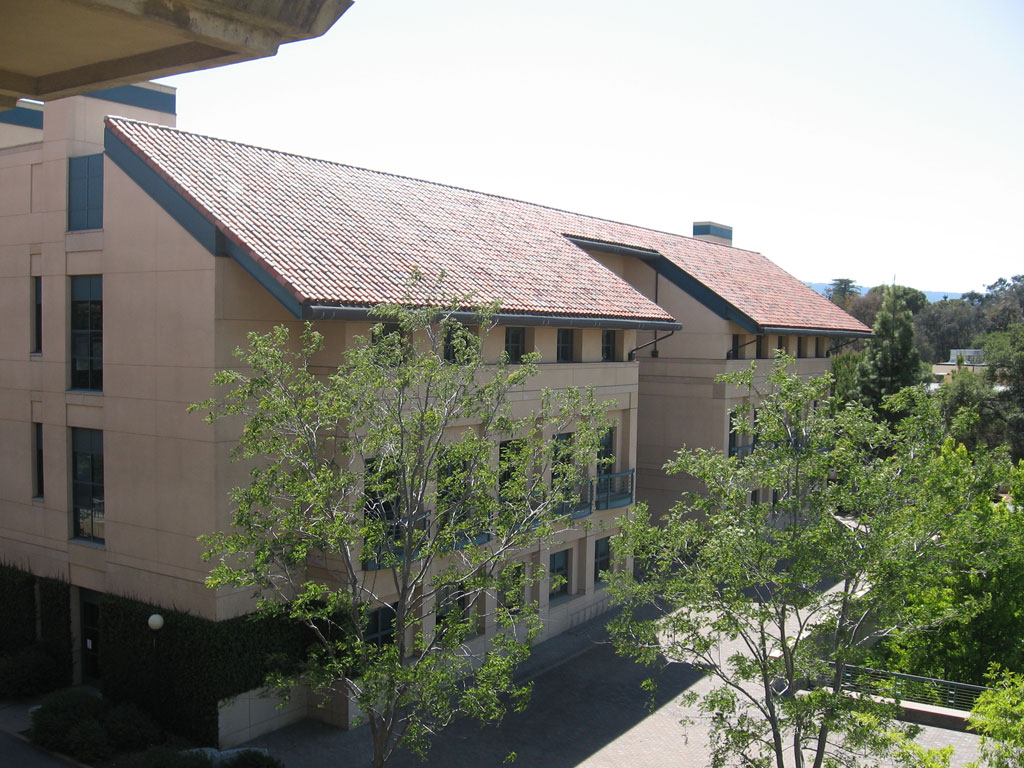
Green Earth Sciences

Dedicated on October 21, 1993, the Cecil H. and Ida M. Green Earth Sciences Research Building at Stanford University houses classrooms, offices, and laboratories for research in the field of earth sciences. The building's extended basement contains the sunken Kresge Plaza, in which rock sculptures are designed to look like a miniature version of local geologic faults. It is named for Cecil Green, who co-founded Texas Instruments in 1951 with Erik Jonsson and Eugene McDermott.
