= Elias Samuel Cooper =

American surgeon (1820–1862)

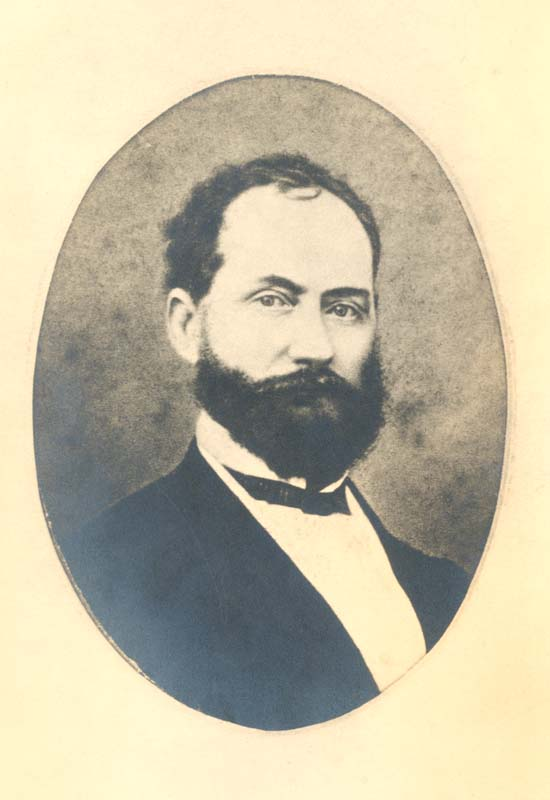
Elias Samuel Cooper

Elias Samuel Cooper (5 November 1820 – 13 October 1862) was an American surgeon who founded the Stanford Medical School.

Cooper was born in the Quaker family of Jacob and Elizabeth Walls living in Somerville, Ohio. He graduated in medicine from St. Louis University. He then practiced in Peoria, Illinois as a surgeon. He moved to San Francisco in 1855 to practice and began a medical school in 1858 with diplomas issued by the University of the Pacific (Santa Clara). The first courses began on 12 May 1859. The early faculty included Cooper as professor of anatomy and surgery, R. Beverly Cole, J. Morrison, A. J. Bowie, Henry Gibbons and Levi Cooper Lane (Cooper's nephew). For some time after the death of Cooper, the school merged into the Toland School but in 1870 Lane and Gibbons resigned to restart the Cooper Medical College which began in 1882.
