= Arkansas Geological Survey =

American government agency

- Great Seal of Arkansas

Agency overview
- Formed: 1857-1860 revived 1887-1893 reconstituted in 1923
- Jurisdiction: State of Arkansas
- Headquarters: 3815 West Roosevelt Road, Little Rock, AR 72204
- Agency executives: Bekki White, Director and State Geologist; Scott M. Ausbrooks, RPG, Assistant Director and Assistant State Geologist
- Website: Geology.AR.Gov

The Arkansas Geological Survey (AGS), formerly the Arkansas Geological Commission (AGC), is a government agency of the State of Arkansas. It is responsible for the investigation of the geology, geologic processes, and geologic resources within the state. It encourages the considered management and utilization of the state's mineral, fossil-fuel, and water resources with attention to the potential environmental issues of that activity.

== History ==
The Geological Survey of Arkansas was first established in 1857, at the direction of Governor Elias Nelson Conway. David Dale Owen was the agencies first geologist. Initially, the agency received funding for only three years, which limited the agencies findings and publications, and the agency was left without funding during the Civil War.

After the war, assertions were made regarding the possibility of the existence of precious metals and the 'Geological Survey of Arkansas' was restored. In 1887, John C. Branner was hired as a state geologist. He employed a staff of geologists, including the young Herbert Hoover, who would go on to become President of the United States. The agency quickly discovered that various precious metal mining promotions were without merit and when those findings were published, enraged operators and investors demanded Branner’s dismissal. The agency was abolished in 1893, though Arkansas legislature continued to provide funds for publication of the agencies work. In 1923, Governor Thomas Chipman McRae re-established the commission, and the present agency was created as the 'Arkansas Geological Commission' by Act 16 of 1963. In 2007, Arkansas Act 129 changed the agency’s name to its current designation as the Arkansas Geological Survey.

== Responsibility ==
The AGS is a scientific research organization that doesn't have any regulatory functions; however, the state geologist, by state law, serves on several state boards, commissions, and task forces such as the Arkansas Pollution Control and Ecology Commission (APCEC), which establishes the rules and regulations for the Arkansas Division of Environmental Quality (ADEQ).

AGS staff serve as advisors to regulatory agencies and special-purpose groups charged with safeguarding the public’s welfare. Their works include the review of mining and reclamation plans, landfill permits, and providing geotechnical counsel. Staff members provide technical assistance on earthquake, environmental, geological mapping, GIS, waste management, and water quality issues.

The AGS conducts research on Arkansas natural gas areas, and on its oil and coal resources. It provides information and assistance regarding metallic and non-metallic mineral resources, and water supplies. The survey works in cooperation with the U.S. Geological Survey’s Water-Resources Division (USGS-WRD), including the collection and publication of data on stream discharge and stage, reservoir and lake storage, groundwater levels, and the physical and chemical quality of both surface and ground water. The agency has ongoing projects in the areas of earthquakes, landslides, and karst issues.

The AGS employs a team of geologists who conduct geological mapping that is provided to government offices and the public in paper and on digital media. It provides presentations and field trips to universities and groups who are interested in the geology, natural history, and public recreation areas of the state. It also develops geological maps and guidebooks for Arkansas State Parks, National Parks, its National Forests, and other areas of public interest.

== See also ==
Geography of Arkansas
