= Cecil Howard Green =

British-born American geophysicist, engineer and electronics executive

Cecil Howard Green KBE
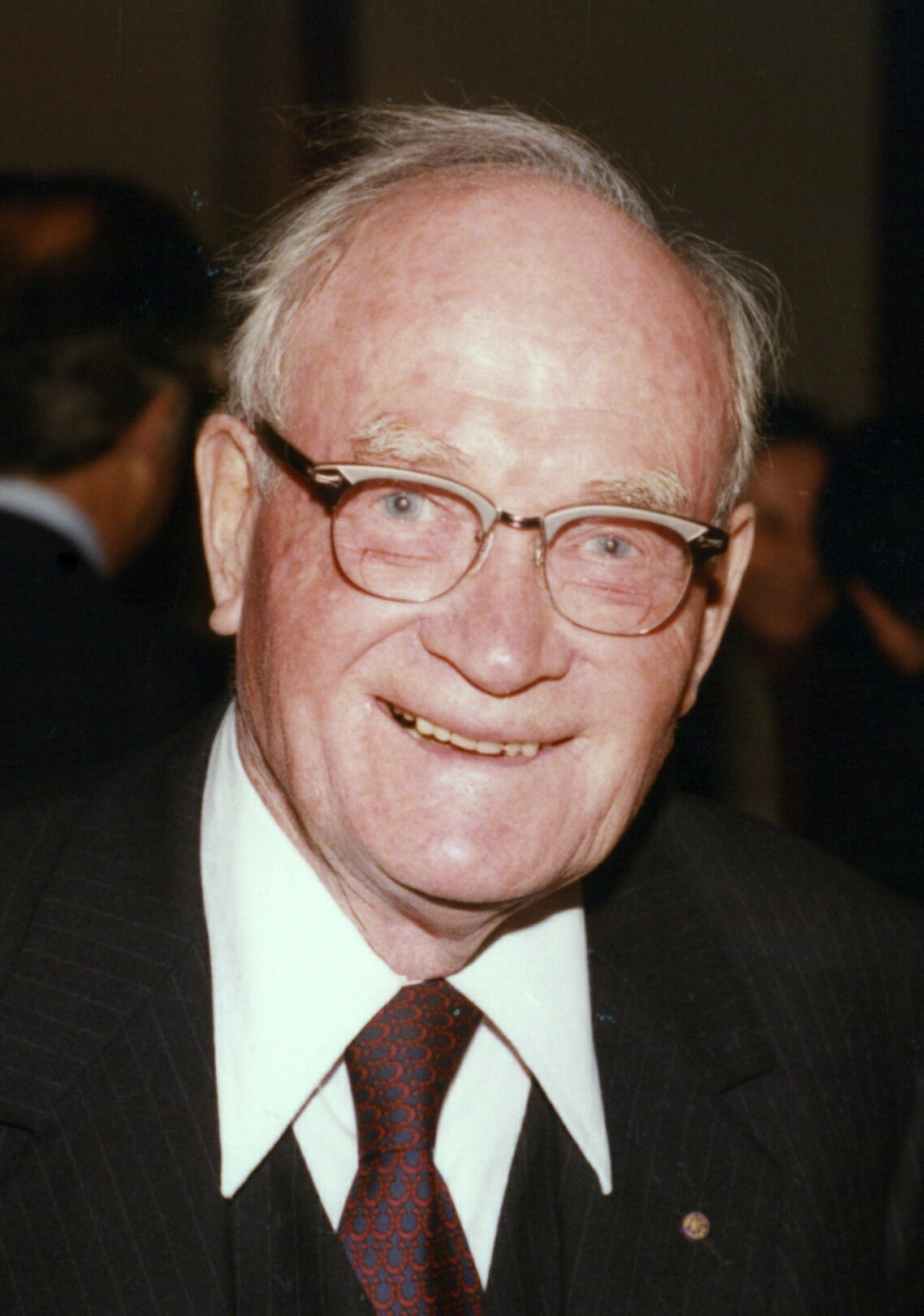
- Cecil Green (mid 1980s)
- Born: August 6, 1900; Whitefield, England
- Died: April 11, 2003 (aged 102); La Jolla, San Diego, California
- Education: University of British Columbia; Massachusetts Institute of Technology (BSE, ME)
- Known for: Cofounder of Texas Instruments(1951); Chairman of GSI (1955–1959); President of GSI (1951–1955); Vice president of GSI (1941–1951)
- Spouse: Ida Green
- Awards: Public Welfare Medal; Revelle Medal

Cecil Howard Green KBE (August 6, 1900 – April 11, 2003) was a British-born American geophysicist, electrical engineer, and electronics manufacturing executive, who trained at the University of British Columbia and the Massachusetts Institute of Technology.

He was a cofounder of Texas Instruments. He and his wife Ida Green were philanthropists who helped found the University of Texas at Dallas, Green College at the University of British Columbia, St. Mark's School of Texas, and Green College at the University of Oxford. They were also major contributors to the Cecil H. Green Library and Green Earth Sciences at Stanford University, the Cecil H. & Ida Green Graduate and Professional Center at the Colorado School of Mines, the Cecil H. & Ida Green Institute of Geophysics and Planetary Physics at the University of California San Diego, the Cecil & Ida Green Building for earth sciences at MIT (designed by I.M. Pei), and the Cecil and Ida Green Tower (the headquarters of the international Society of Exploration Geophysicists in Tulsa, OK). Cecil H. and Ida Green Center for Reproductive Biology Sciences at the University of Texas Southwestern Medical Center is named in their honor.

== Biography ==
Born in Whitefield, England, in 1900, Green and his family migrated to Toronto, Ontario, Canada and San Francisco, United States, where he witnessed the 1906 San Francisco earthquake. The family moved to Vancouver, British Columbia, Canada, where Green attended UBC for two years before transferring to the Massachusetts Institute of Technology, earning both a bachelor's and master's degree in electrical engineering in 1924.

Green met Ida Flansburgh in 1923 while working on his master's thesis at the General Electric Research Center in Schenectady, New York. They were married for 60 years, until her death in 1986.

In 1941, Green and his partners J. Erik Jonsson, Eugene McDermott and H.B. Peacock bought Geophysical Service Incorporated (GSI), primarily a petroleum exploration company. GSI began to manufacture a broader range of electronics equipment and instruments during World War II, including anti-submarine sonar detectors. In 1951 GSI spun off Texas Instruments Incorporated (TI) to pursue the manufacture of a broader range of electronics equipment and instruments, while GSI, now as a wholly owned subsidiary of TI, continued to focus solely on oil exploration services.

Green was vice president (1941–1951), president (1951–1955) and chairman of GSI (1955–1959). He was vice president and a director of Texas Instruments and in 1976 was named an honorary director of the company. He was elected a Fellow of the American Academy of Arts and Sciences in 1970. In 1978, he was given the inaugural Maurice Ewing Medal of the Society of Exploration Geophysicists, its highest award. In 1979 Green and his wife were awarded the Public Welfare Medal from the National Academy of Sciences. In 1985, Green received the Golden Plate Award of the American Academy of Achievement.

Cecil Howard Green died in 2003 at the age of 102.

== Philanthropy ==
The growth of Texas Instruments made Green a wealthy man, and he and Ida quickly set about giving his wealth away. The Greens' philanthropic efforts totalled over $200 million, and most of this money was given to education and medicine. He was given an honorary knighthood in 1991 (at age 91) by Queen Elizabeth II.

One gift was the founding of the Cecil H. and Ida M. Green branch of the University of California Systemwide Institute of Geophysics and Planetary Physics (IGPP). This branch is located at the Scripps Institution of Oceanography.

It was because of Green's gift that Green College, Oxford was founded in 1979. Green College merged with Templeton College in 2008 to become Green Templeton College, on the site of what was previously Green College.

Some of Green's philanthropy at the University of British Columbia (UBC) was encouraged by William Carleton Gibson, a neurologist in Victoria, British Columbia, Canada. Both Gibson and Green referred to Gibson as "Cecil Green's most expensive friend" due to his encouragement to fund the Cecil and Ida Green Visiting Professorship and Green College, University of British Columbia. In 1998, the UBC Alumni Association gave Green and Gibson alumni "Lifetime Achievement Awards" in recognition of their support for the university.

== See also ==
- Cecil H. Green Library
- Green College, Oxford
- Green College, University of British Columbia
