= Levi Cooper Lane =

American physician (1828–1902)

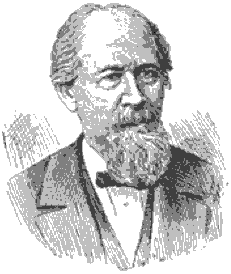
- Born: May 9, 1828; Somerville, Ohio
- Died: February 9, 1902 (aged 73); San Francisco, California
- Education: Farmer's College; Union Theological Seminary; Jefferson Medical College
- Spouse: Pauline C. Sampson (m. 1870)
- Scientific career
- Workplaces: United States Navy; College of the Pacific; Toland Medical College; Cooper Medical College

Levi Cooper Lane (May 9, 1828 – February 9, 1902) was an American physician and surgeon. He established the Cooper Medical College, forerunner to the Stanford University School of Medicine, as well as laying the groundwork for Stanford's medical library and the Stanford School of Nursing. The university's medical library is still named Lane Medical Library in his honor.

== Early life and education ==
Lane was born in Somerville, Ohio on May 9, 1828. He attended Farmer's College near Cincinnati and received an MA degree from Union Theological Seminary in New York City.

He received a medical degree from Jefferson Medical College in Philadelphia in 1851. He interned for four years and then served in the U.S. Navy as an Assistant Surgeon from 1855 to 1859.

== Early career ==
Cooper Medical College, San Francisco, 1882. Photo from Lane Medical Archives Photo File, Box 9, folder 6. Reproduced with permission by the Stanford Medical History Center

He then settled in San Francisco, where his uncle, Elias Samuel Cooper, also a physician, had just established the first medical college on the West Coast of the United States in 1858. The medical school was chartered by the College of the Pacific (now the University of the Pacific). It was called the Medical Department of the College of the Pacific and was staffed entirely by local practicing physicians. Cooper served as president and chief surgeon; Lane became a faculty member.

After Cooper's death in 1862, the Medical Department ceased operation. Lane and other faculty members began teaching at the newly established Toland Medical College (later the University of California, San Francisco) instead.

Lane married Pauline C. Sampson in 1870.

== Later career ==
Lane wanted to revive his uncle's college and in 1870 he succeeded in reopening it. He served as president and recruited some of Cooper's former faculty members as instructors. The school was affiliated with University College, later the San Francisco Theological Seminary, and the name was changed to the Medical College of the Pacific.

Lane had bigger plans for the school, and in 1882 he renamed it Cooper Medical College, after his uncle, the founder. He moved it to a new brick building at Sacramento and Webster Streets which he had personally financed. He also built Lane Hospital and a nursing school, and made provision in his will for the construction of a freestanding medical library.

== Death and legacy ==
Lane died in San Francisco on February 9, 1902, and his widow died that August; one third of Lane's estate was bequeathed to Cooper Medical College to establish a medical library. In 1908, Stanford acquired Cooper Medical College as the nucleus for the Stanford Medical Department, now the Stanford University School of Medicine.

In 1910, Stanford also acquired the assets of the Levi C. Lane Medical Library Trust, consisting of 30,000 volumes as well as a building site and funds for the building of a library. Lane Library was dedicated November 3, 1912, on the southeast corner of Webster and Sacramento Streets, across the street from the medical school. By then the medical school had become the Stanford University Department of Medicine. The medical school and Lane Library were moved to the main Stanford campus in 1959.

A volume of memorial exercises commemorating Lane was published in 1902 by his colleagues at Cooper Medical College.
