= Lane Medical Library =

Library at Stanford University

Coordinates: 37.425686°N 122.167360°W

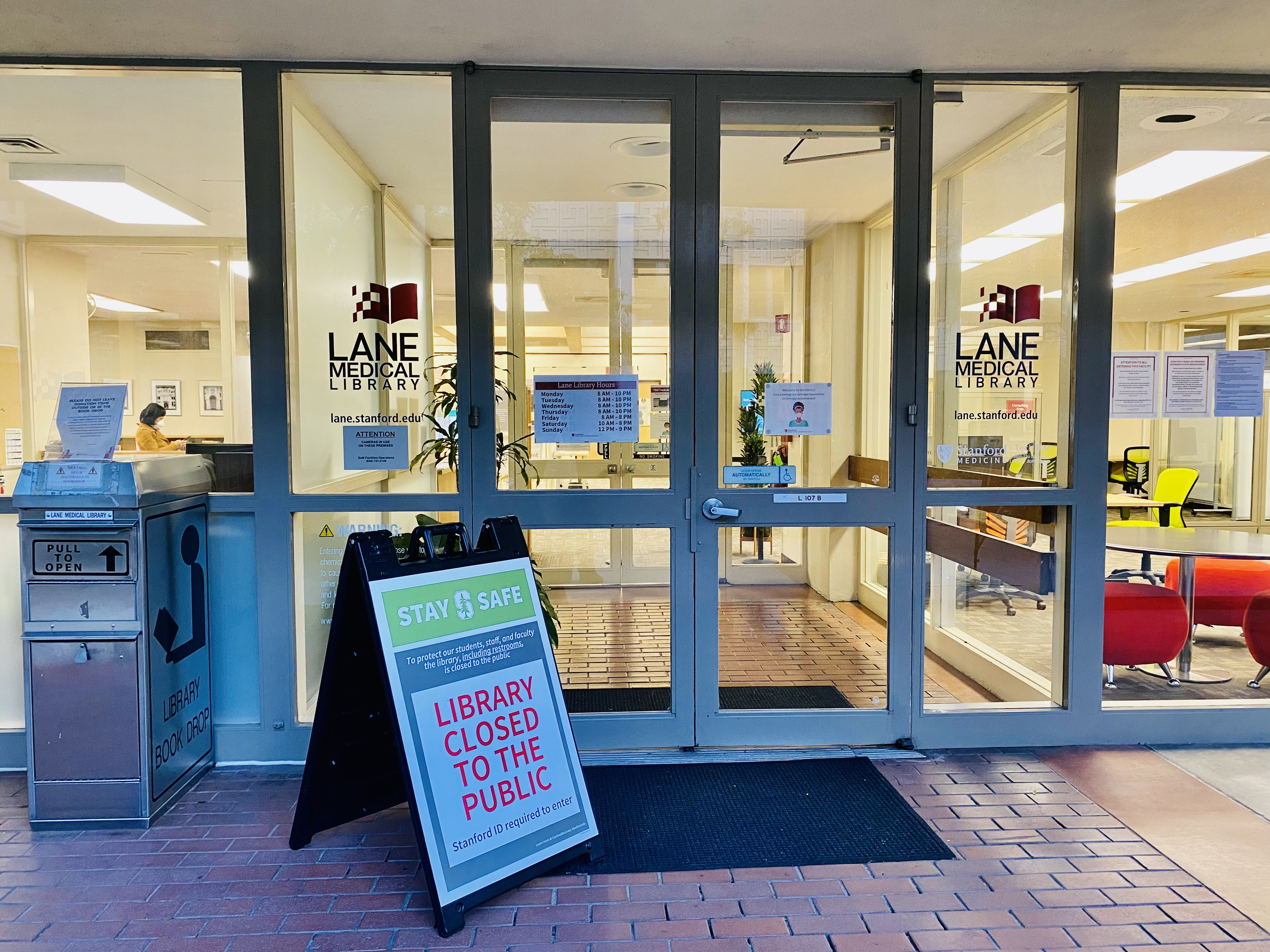
Lane Medical Library entrance

Lane Medical Library is the library of the Stanford University School of Medicine at Stanford University, near Palo Alto, California. Its mission is to "accelerate scientific discovery, clinical care, medical education and humanities through teaching, collaboration, and delivery of biomedical and historical resources". It is located on campus adjacent to Stanford Hospital and Clinics. In addition to books, journals and documents for medical research and the teaching and practice of medicine, Lane Library houses a significant collection of material relating to the history of medicine. The library also provides specialized search capabilities, classes and tutorials, writing and grant support, and group and individual study spaces.

== History ==
Cooper Medical College, San Francisco, 1882. Photo from Lane Medical Archives Photo File, Box 9, folder 6. Reproduced with permission by the Stanford Medical History Center

Levi Cooper Lane was a physician and surgeon in San Francisco in the 1800s. He served on the faculty of the Medical Department of the College of the Pacific, which was the first medical school on the Pacific Coast, founded in 1858 by Lane's uncle Elias Samuel Cooper. After Cooper's death in 1862 the medical school stopped operating. In 1870 Lane revived it, became president, and renamed it Medical College of the Pacific. In 1882 he changed the name to Cooper Medical College, named for his uncle, its founder. He built with his own funds a new brick medical school building at the corner of Sacramento and Webster streets, which served continuously as a medical school from 1882 until 1959. He also built an adjacent hospital and nursing school, and made provision in his will for the construction of a library across the street from the college.

Lane died on February 9, 1902, and his widow died in August 1902; in his widow's will, one third of Lane's estate was given to Cooper Medical College to establish a medical library. In August 1906, the directors of Cooper Medical College passed a resolution establishing the Lane Medical Library. In 1908, Stanford acquired Cooper Medical College as the nucleus for the Stanford Medical Department, now the Stanford University School of Medicine. In 1910 Stanford also acquired the assets of the Levi C. Lane Medical Library Trust, consisting of 30,000 volumes as well as a building site and funds for the building of a library. Lane Library was dedicated November 3, 1912. It was an integral part of the Stanford library system despite being located in San Francisco. It was the largest medical library west of Chicago. The building still stands; it now houses the California Pacific Medical Center Health Sciences Library. The medical school and Lane Library were moved to the main Stanford campus in 1959.
