= Somerville, Ohio =

- Census-designated place
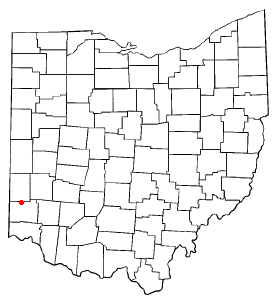
- Location of Somerville, Ohio

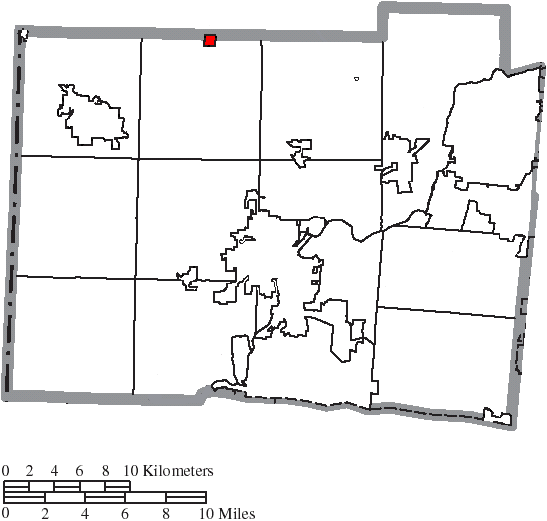
- Location of Somerville in Butler County
- Coordinates: 39°33′50″N 84°38′20″W
- Country: United States
- State: Ohio
- County: Butler
- Township: Milford
- Incorporated: 1832
- Dissolved: March 15, 2016

Area
  - Total: 0.27 sq mi (0.69 km^{2})
  - Land: 0.26 sq mi (0.68 km^{2})
  - Water: 0.0039 sq mi (0.01 km^{2})
- Elevation: 768 ft (234 m)

Population (2020)
  - Total: 258
  - Density: 977.8/sq mi (377.52/km^{2})
- Time zone: UTC-5 (Eastern (EST))
  - Summer (DST): UTC-4 (EDT)
- ZIP code: 45064
- Area code: 513
- FIPS code: 39-72998
- GNIS feature ID: 2785016

Somerville is a census-designated place (CDP) and former village in Milford Township, Butler County, Ohio, United States. The population was 258 at the 2020 census.

== Geography ==
According to the United States Census Bureau, the village had a total area of 0.25 square miles (0.65 km^{2}), all land.

== History ==
Somerville was incorporated as a village in 1832. On March 15, 2016, Somerville residents voted 52% to 48% to dissolve the village into Milford Township, after its entire council faced term limits or resigned.

== Demographics ==
Historical population
Census	Pop.	Note	%±
1860	385		—
1870	389		1.0%
1880	370		−4.9%
1890	330		−10.8%
1900	300		−9.1%
1910	349		16.3%
1920	305		−12.6%
1930	351		15.1%
1940	359		2.3%
1950	383		6.7%
1960	478		24.8%
1970	388		−18.8%
1980	357		−8.0%
1990	279		−21.8%
2000	294		5.4%
2010	281		−4.4%
2020	258		−8.2%
U.S. Decennial Census

=== 2010 census ===
As of the census of 2010, there were 281 people, 96 households, and 74 families living in the village. The population density was 1,124.0 inhabitants per square mile (434.0/km^{2}). There were 106 housing units at an average density of 424.0 per square mile (163.7/km^{2}). The racial makeup of the village was 98.2% White and 1.8% from two or more races.

There were 96 households, of which 34.4% had children under the age of 18 living with them, 58.3% were married couples living together, 10.4% had a female householder with no husband present, 8.3% had a male householder with no wife present, and 22.9% were non-families. 19.8% of all households were made up of individuals, and 4.1% had someone living alone who was 65 years of age or older. The average household size was 2.93 and the average family size was 3.34.

The median age in the village was 37.8 years. 24.9% of residents were under the age of 18; 8.1% were between the ages of 18 and 24; 23.1% were from 25 to 44; 31.2% were from 45 to 64; and 12.5% were 65 years of age or older. The gender makeup of the village was 53.0% male and 47.0% female.

=== 2000 census ===
As of the census of 2000, there were 294 people, 106 households, and 85 families living in the village. The population density was 1,014.4 inhabitants per square mile (391.7/km^{2}). There were 110 housing units at an average density of 379.5 per square mile (146.5/km^{2}). The racial makeup of the village was 99.66% White, and 0.34% Asian.

There were 106 households, out of which 33.0% had children under the age of 18 living with them, 62.3% were married couples living together, 13.2% had a female householder with no husband present, and 18.9% were non-families. 16.0% of all households were made up of individuals, and 9.4% had someone living alone who was 65 years of age or older. The average household size was 2.77 and the average family size was 2.99.

In the village the population was spread out, with 26.5% under the age of 18, 7.5% from 18 to 24, 28.2% from 25 to 44, 24.5% from 45 to 64, and 13.3% who were 65 years of age or older. The median age was 35 years. For every 100 females, there were 101.4 males. For every 100 females age 18 and over, there were 92.9 males.

The median income for a household in the village was $32,857, and the median income for a family was $34,583. Males had a median income of $34,167 versus $18,594 for females. The per capita income for the village was $13,892. About 5.9% of families and 10.3% of the population were below the poverty line, including 10.2% of those under the age of eighteen and 5.3% of those 65 or over.
