= Branner Earth Sciences Library =

The Branner Earth Sciences Library and Map Collections is the main library supporting the Stanford University School of Earth, Energy & Environmental Sciences on the Stanford University campus and part of Stanford University Libraries and Academic Information Resources (SULAIR). It was named after John Casper Branner, first professor of geology and former president of Stanford University, whose book collection was the initial core of the library. Branner Library contains more than 125,000 volumes, including 2000 serial titles, most of which are related to the earth and environmental sciences. The library also houses a collection of over 270,000 sheet maps and the Branner GIS facilities and services.

== History ==
Branner Earth Sciences Library and Map Collections had its origins when Stanford's first faculty member and second President, John Casper Branner, began buying books as an 18-year-old student at Cornell. He continued to acquire books, maps, and reports while at the Pennsylvania and Arkansas Geological Surveys. When he came to Stanford in 1891, he and his wife brought a boxcar full of books, which became the de facto departmental library, with himself also as the university's first librarian. He oversaw its continued growth and use by colleagues and students until he sold it to the university in 1915. He continued to buy and donate books to the collection until his death in 1922. Later, during the tenure of librarian Kathryn Cutler (1939–1979) the library had been moved from its long-time location on the second floor of Geology Corner to its current location in the Mitchell Earth Sciences Building.

== Building ==
Between 1968 and 1970, Spencer, Lee & Busse provided architectural design and planning for the building that houses the Earth Sciences library. The design includes a small, permanent mineral exhibit in the Mitchell Earth Sciences Building open to the public. Most specimens are on the second floor of the Branner Library, surrounded by a spiral staircase or glass library court.

== Collections and services ==
- GIS at Branner Library at Stanford University Libraries
- Map Collections (270,000 sheet maps) are housed in the Branner Earth Sciences Library at Stanford University Libraries
- John Casper Branner Presidential Papers, 1913-1917 (6.5 linear ft.) are housed in the Department of Special Collections and University Archives at Stanford University Libraries
