= John Casper Branner =

American geologist and academic administrator

John C. Branner
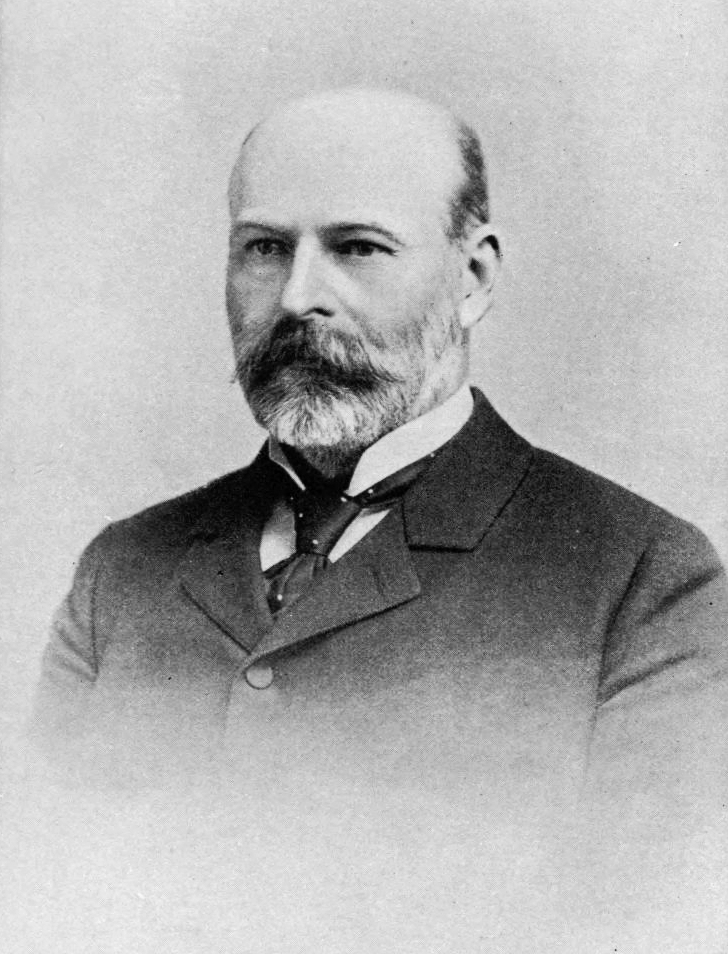
- Branner in 1896

2nd President of Stanford University
- In office 1913 – December 31, 1915
- Preceded by: David Starr Jordan
- Succeeded by: Ray Lyman Wilbur

Personal details
- Born: July 4, 1850 New Market, Tennessee, U.S.
- Died: March 1, 1922 (aged 71) Palo Alto, California, U.S.
- Education: Cornell University (BS); Indiana University Bloomington (PhD)
- Profession: Geologist

John Casper Branner (July 4, 1850 – March 1, 1922) was an American geologist and academic who discovered bauxite in Arkansas in 1887 as State Geologist for the Geological Survey of Arkansas. He was chair of the Departments of Botany and Geology at Indiana University Bloomington and later at Stanford University. He was a member of the founding faculty at Stanford and served as the university's second president. He served as president of the Geological Society of America in 1904. He was president of the Seismological Society of America in 1911. He was an expert in Brazilian geology, among many other things.

== Biography ==
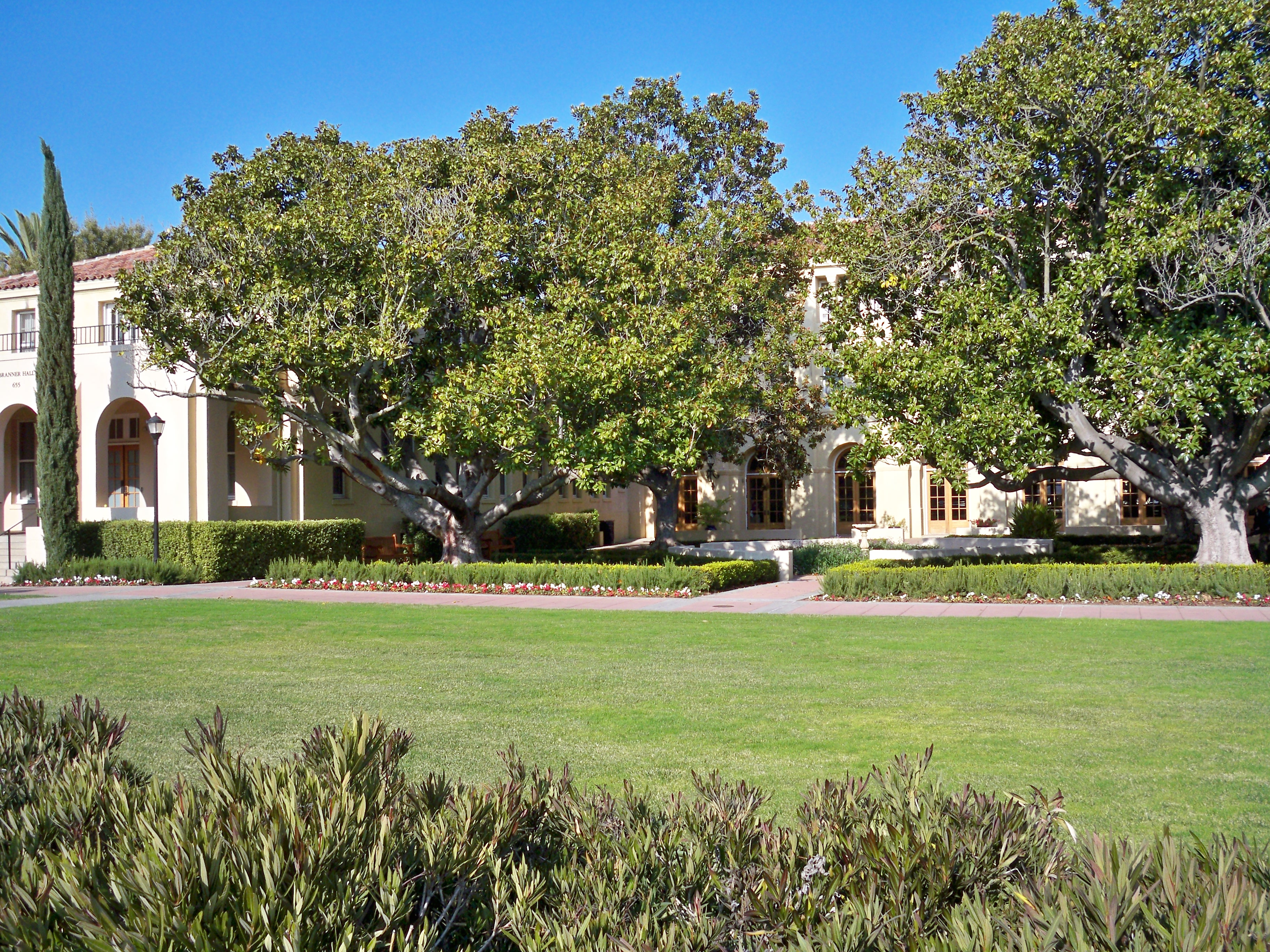
Branner Hall, a student residence on the Stanford University campus.

Branner was born in the town of New Market, Tennessee, where his father was a merchant. In 1852, the family went to live on a farm given to his father by his grandfather a mile east of Dandridge on the French Broad River. He grew up there and on an adjacent property to which the family moved in 1859. During the Civil War he was very anxious to join the Confederate army, and on two occasions left school for the purpose of enlisting. His age, however, prevented his being accepted; he was only thirteen.

In 1865, he went to school for a year at New Market and in 1867, he spent a year at Maryville College. He left that institution in 1868, and in 1869, went to Ithaca, New York, to attend Cornell University. He spent a year attending Ithaca Academy and entered Cornell in 1870, in the so-called classical course.

In 1874, without having completed his university studies, he went by way of Europe to Brazil with Charles Fred Hartt, then professor of geology at Cornell. In 1875, he was made assistant on the geological survey of Brazil and remained on that work until the survey was abolished by the government and Professor Hartt died. In 1879, he accepted a position as assistant engineer and interpreter for the São Cyriaco Gold Mining Company of Boston and spent a year near Serro, state of Minas Geraes, in the diamond regions of Brazil. In 1881, he returned to the United States, but was sent back to South America by Thomas Edison in search of a vegetable fiber for use in his then newly invented incandescent electric lamp.

In 1882, he returned to Cornell University, completed his studies, and graduated with a Bachelor of Science degree. From 1883 to 1885, he was topographic geologist of the Geological Survey of Pennsylvania in the anthracite regions; in 1885, after receiving his Ph.D. from Indiana University, he was made professor of geology at Indiana University, a position he held until 1891, though he was absent on leave for several years. In 1886, he was elected as a member to the American Philosophical Society. In 1887, he was appointed State Geologist of the Geological Survey of Arkansas. As State Geologist, he exposed gold-mining swindles then operating in Arkansas, for which the citizens of Bear City, Arkansas, burned him in effigy, and the stock promoters tried to have him fired. In 1891, he was appointed professor and chair of the Department of Geology at the newly opened Stanford University, recruited by his colleague from Cornell and Indiana, Stanford President David Starr Jordan. When Jordan retired as president of Stanford in 1913, Branner was elected President of the university. He retired January 1, 1916, due to an age limit established by the university and was named President Emeritus.

While at Stanford he directed the Agassiz-Branner expedition to Brazil in 1899 and a second similar expedition in 1907–1908. He served on government commissions studying the Panama Canal and the 1906 San Francisco earthquake. He published a grammar of the Portuguese language, based on his work in Brazil, which went to multiple editions.

In 1913, he greatly contributed to genealogical research of the Shenandoah Valley by privately publishing Casper Branner of Virginia and his Descendants, a 453-page work documenting the genealogy of the Branner family and in particular the descendants of his great-great-grandparents, Casper Branner (1729–1792) and wife Catherine (1730–1800).

He died in Palo Alto, California, in 1922.

== Legacy ==
A dormitory building, Branner Hall, and the Branner Earth Sciences Library at Stanford are named after him. Two of his Stanford students, United States President Herbert Hoover and his wife Lou Henry Hoover, dedicated their English translation of the medieval mining classic De re metallica to Branner.

The mineral, brannerite, a uranium ore mineral, was named in his honor.

A fossil bonefish from Brazil, Brannerion, was named after him by Jordan in 1920; Branner had previously helped to describe one of the species (B. vestitum, previously Calamopleurus vestitus) that was assigned to the genus. A species of crab found in California, Cancer branneri now Romaleon branneri commonly known as the furrowed rock crab, was named after him in 1926.

== Research resources ==
- http://www.oac.cdlib.org/findaid/ark:/13030/tf5j49n80q John Casper Branner Presidential Papers, 1913-1917] (6.5 linear ft.) are housed in the Department of Special Collections and University Archives at Stanford University Libraries

Academic offices
Preceded by David Starr Jordan	President of Stanford University; 1913 – 1915	Succeeded by Ray Lyman Wilbur
