= Fleet Street (disambiguation) =

Fleet Street is a major street in London, England, famously host to major British newspapers from the 16th to 20th centuries.

Fleet Street may also refer to:

== Streets ==
- Fleet Street (Baltimore) in Baltimore
- Fleet Street, Dublin, Ireland
- Fleet Street in Brooklyn, New York City
- Fleet Street in Kingston, Jamaica, Jamaica
- Fleet Street in Regina, Saskatchewan, Canada
- Fleet Street in Toronto, Ontario, Canada

== Arts and media ==
- A popular metonym for the British national press, derived from the London street — see List of newspapers in the United Kingdom
- Sweeney Todd (disambiguation), the demon barber of Fleet Street, a story adapted numerous times in film and in theater from 1928–present

=== Music ===
- Stanford Fleet Street Singers, a collegiate comedy a cappella group from Stanford, CA
  - Fleet Street (album) (2004), the first entirely-original collegiate a cappella album and the 11th studio album by the Stanford Fleet Street Singers.

=== Television ===
- Fleet Street, the working title of the 2000s American legal drama eventually produced as Boston Legal
- "Fleet Street Goodies", an episode of the 1970s British TV show The Goodies

== Other ==
- Fleet Street Publisher
- Fleet Street Pumping Station, in Ottawa, Ontario
- Queen's Wharf Lighthouse, also known as the "Fleet Street Lighthouse", on Fleet Street in Toronto, Ontario
- Fleet Street, A competitor who failed to complete the 2009 Grand National
