= 50-Minute Fun Break =

1992 studio album by Stanford Fleet Street Singers

Studio album by Stanford Fleet Street Singers
- Released: 1992
- Recorded: 1991–1992
- Studio: Astral Sound in San Jose, California
- Genre: A cappella; comedy music; jazz standards
- Length: 53:31
- Producer: Ben Evans; Bill Hare; Chad Dyer

Stanford Fleet Street Singers chronology
curious... (1990)	50-Minute Fun Break (1992)	What You Want (1994)

50-Minute Fun Break, released in 1992, is the fourth studio album by the collegiate comedy a cappella group the Stanford Fleet Street Singers. It was a landmark album in the a cappella genre for its pioneering recording techniques and use of studio effects. The album won critical acclaim for its studio work, including a special award in engineering from the Contemporary A Cappella Recording Awards, although some critics criticized the studio engineering as "intrusive." 50-Minute Fun Break marked a breakout album for its audio engineer, Bill Hare, who went on to become the most-awarded engineer in a cappella.

== Critical reception ==
The album was generally well-received, with critics noting its new style of studio engineering, the group's original songs, and 3D-modeled computer-generated cover art. A critic from the Recorded A Cappella Review Board wrote of the album: "Of all of the collegiate albums I have heard, this is the one that I would recommend most readily. If I could have only one collegiate album, this would be it." At the Contemporary A Cappella Recording Awards (CARAs), the album won awards in five categories, a new record for the Awards.

=== Engineering ===
50-Minute Fun Break featured a number of studio effects never heard before in recorded a cappella. At the turn of the 1990s, through collaborations with Fleet Street and with other Stanford a cappella group the Mendicants, audio engineer Bill Hare had developed new methods for recording a cappella. Before, a cappella was generally recorded exactly as a listener would perceive a live performance: with two microphones capturing the whole group at once, singing in a room. Hare's new techniques, which he'd deployed in part on Fleet Street's 1990 album curious..., principally involved recording every voice as one would record instruments: each voice with its own microphone, and each singer just a few inches away from their microphone. Placing all the voices so close to the listener's ear increased the presence of each voice, creating a new sound that would come to define contemporary a cappella recording.

At the time of the album's release, its engineering polarized a cappella critics. On the one hand, one critic praised the album, saying "[Fleet Street's] studio engineering work is incredible", and a second said, "This is technically one of the best albums I've heard from the collegiate scene." On the other hand, some critics took issue with the studio work, calling it "intrusive," "unnatural," and "strange." One argued that a studio "should be used to enhance and perfect the original sound of the group, not add odd effects and sounds unachievable on stage." Another hedged their positive commentary, saying, "I didn't care for some of the strange studio effects on the basses."

At the 1993 Contemporary A Cappella Recording Awards, CASA president Deke Sharon praised the album, writing in a statement that 50-Minute Fun Break had "the best engineering we've ever heard on any collegiate album. Ever." In a podcast twenty-five years later, Sharon recalled, "It was so exemplary, it was so ahead of its time, that Bill Hare just walked away with a special award in best engineering."

=== Accolades ===
The Contemporary A Cappella Society announced the second annual Recording Awards in 1993. 50-Minute Fun Break won a record-setting five categories at the Recording Awards, including Best Album and Best Song in the male collegiate category.

Year	Award	Category	Nominee(s)	Result	Ref.
1993	Contemporary A Cappella Recording Awards	Best Male Collegiate Album	50-Minute Fun Break (1992)	Won	
1993	Contemporary A Cappella Recording Awards	Best Male Collegiate Song	"You Always Hurt the One You Love"	Won	
1993	Contemporary A Cappella Recording Awards	Best Original Collegiate Song	"Prayer to the God of Partial Credit" (Note: Originally composed by Fleet Street founder Kyle Kashima, with lyrics by Bambi Haggins.)	Won	
1993	Contemporary A Cappella Recording Awards	Best Collegiate Cover Design	Gray Norton	Won	
1993	Contemporary A Cappella Recording Awards	Best Mixing and Engineering	Ben Evans and Bill Hare	Won	

== Influence ==
Audio engineer Bill Hare had been pioneering contemporary a cappella recording techniques for a few years, including on albums by the Stanford Mendicants and on Fleet Street's prior release, curious... (1990). But it was Hare's engineering on 50-Minute Fun Break that landed him on the map for good. Hare would go on to work with a cappella's biggest groups, including winners of The Sing-Off such as Nota, Home Free, and Pentatonix, with whom Hare would earn a 2× multi-platinum certification.

== Track listing ==
Credits adapted from liner notes.

No.	Title	Writer(s)	Arranger(s)	Length
1.	"Hello, My Baby (Live)"	Howard and Emerson	P. Rardin with Tom Smith (Note: Denotes a member of the Stanford Fleet Street Singers)	3:22
2.	"Ruby Baby"	Jerry Leiber and Mike Stoller (Note: Arrangement of cover by Donald Fagen.)	Tom Smith	4:15
3.	"The Pharaoh Bop (Note: A Fleet Street original song.)"	Martin Puryear, Eric Ranelletti, Kevin Quinn, and Sean Mitchell	Martin Puryear, Eric Ranelletti, Kevin Quinn, and Sean Mitchell	4:44
4.	"It's a Blue World"	Chet Forrest and Bob Wright	Jason Venner	2:32
5.	"Since I Fell for You"	Buddy Johnson	D. Norfleet	3:46
6.	"Dat Dere"	Bobby Timmons	Chad Dyer	2:35
7.	"When I Fall in Love"	Victor Young and Edward Heyman	R. Campbell	3:54
8.	"Think"	Aretha Franklin and Teddy White	Ben Evans	2:57
9.	"Wonder Woman (Note: Theme song to Season 1 of the 1970s TV series Wonder Woman.)"	Charles Fox and Norman Gimbel	Sean Gibson, Jason Windawi, Greg Chun, Bill Moore	1:48
10.	"Stanford Girl"	Jason Mayland	Jason Mayland	3:21
11.	"My Funny Valentine"	Richard Rodgers and Lorenz Hart	Kyle Kashima	4:31
12.	"You Always Hurt the One You Love"	Allan Roberts and Doris Fisher (Note: Arrangement in the style of Spike Jones and his parody version of the original song.)	Ben Evans	3:06
13.	"Natural Woman (Note: Original performed by Aretha Franklin.)"	Gerry Goffin, Carole King, and Jerry Wexler	Ben Evans	2:51
14.	"Jingle Bells"	James Lord Pierpont	Martin Puryear	3:00
15.	"Their Hearts Were Full of Spring"	Bobby Troup	Ben Evans	2:43
16.	"Prayer to the God of Partial Credit"	Kyle Kashima and Bambi Haggins	Martin Puryear	4:06
Total length:				53:31

== Personnel ==
Credits adapted from liner notes.

- Engineering – Bill Hare
- Mixing – Ben Evans and Bill Hare
- Art and Design – Gray Norton
- Sound effects – Ben Evans, Ben Meisel, Chad Dyer (track 12)

== See also ==
- Fleet Street (2004)
- Stanford Fleet Street Singers
- Bill Hare
