= Bill Hare =

Pioneering a cappella audio engineer

- Origin: Milpitas, California
- Genres: A cappella
- Occupations: Recording, mixing and mastering engineer
- Years active: 1985–present
- Website: billhareacappella.com

Bill Hare is an American Grammy Award-winning audio engineer known for pioneering contemporary recording techniques in a cappella. He was the first to record voices individually, and the first to mic singers exactly as one would mic instruments. Over the course of his career, Hare has become well known for his outsize role in shaping the sound of recorded a cappella. Industry observers have called him the "patriarch" and "the Dr. Dre" of a cappella recording. Deke Sharon, founder and longtime president of the Contemporary A Cappella Society, wrote of Hare's influence in 2018: "The sound of contemporary recorded a cappella owes more to his technique, style, and pioneering than any other person."

== Career ==
=== Early years (1980s–1992) ===
Hare began his career playing bass, which he had studied while in college at San Jose State University. At the beginning of the 1980s, Hare began working with a professional recording studio in the San Francisco Bay Area as a session musician. In 1984, Hare purchased part ownership in the studio, and began his first work as a recording, mixing and mastering engineer. In these first few years, he recorded some a cappella music, but generally choral, barbershop, and jazz rather than "a cappella" in its contemporary sense.

His career took a turn toward a cappella in 1988, when the Stanford Mendicants were referred to Hare to record their 1988–89 album Aquapella. Their 1990 follow-up album together earned the attention of Deke Sharon in Boston, who had heard the album and who wrote Hare a letter describing his new a cappella society (what would become the Contemporary A Cappella Society, also known as CASA). Hare soon began working with other Stanford a cappella groups, developing new techniques along the way. In a 2019 interview, Hare described the circumstances under which he developed his new recording techniques with collegiate a cappella groups:

"An a cappella group came to the studio... At first I thought it was really weird—why would you do this to pop music? [But] the people were really cool, and over the years, it gave me a lot more creative control. The groups were willing to be experimented on... I developed a lot of the techniques that people still use now just by the seat of my pants, and we had fun creating new things."

Chief among Hare's innovations was recording each voice with its own microphones. Recording in those days on analog tape, modern techniques such as recording individual parts to a click track and editing them together did not yet exist.

It was his engineering for the Stanford Fleet Street Singers' 1992 album 50-Minute Fun Break that landed him on the map for good. A critic from the Recorded A Cappella Review Board wrote of the album: "Of all of the collegiate albums I have heard, this is the one that I would recommend most readily. If I could have only one collegiate album, this would be it." The album's engineering polarized critics: One said, "[Fleet Street's] studio engineering work is incredible", and a second said, "This is technically one of the best albums I've heard from the collegiate scene", but other critics panned the studio work, calling it "unnatural", "intrusive", and "strange". At the Contemporary A Cappella Recording Awards (CARAs) the next year, the album won awards in five categories, including Best Mixing and Engineering for Hare. Sharon wrote in a statement for CASA that the album had "the best engineering we've ever heard on any collegiate album. Ever." In a 2019 podcast, Sharon recalled, "It was so exemplary, it was so ahead of its time, that [Hare] just walked away with a special award in best engineering."

=== Later years (1993–present) ===
Hare's influence in the recorded a cappella world expanded (even as he continued recording orchestral and concert band albums on the side). With his trendsetting work, Hare began earning a cappella-related awards at a steady clip. In 1999, Stanford University a cappella groups were nominated for a record 14 Contemporary A Cappella Recording Awards for their new albums. Hare had produced nearly all of them.

At the end of the '90s, Hare was friends with the creators of ProTools. He became one of their beta testers, trying the earliest four-track music editing programs, among others. With digital processing, Hare was among the first to include in a cappella music distortion, phasers and flangers. Hare pioneered the practice of "octavizing" the lowest vocal bass part (lower its pitch by an octave), first included on Stanford Counterpoint's 1996 album "Nomansland".

In 2001, The House Jacks brought to Hare raw recordings from live performances across their entire European tour. "By that time, I had worked with some collegiate stuff that was pretty cool," Hare recalled as a guest on a 2019 podcast, "with [Stanford's] Mixed Company and the Harmonics—Fleet Street—newer groups, and by that time I'd experimented enough to know I could do anything I could hear in my head, as long as I could get the performance [from the group]."

For The House Jacks' next album (Unbroken (2003), modeled after Queen's A Night at the Opera), Hare struck a deal for revenue sharing, instead of accepting a fixed fee; this created an opportunity for them to work together until the album was the best it could be. "This was the time to make a breakthrough," Hare later recalled, "That this might be something that would sell outside of [the a cappella community]."

In 2011, Hare won a Grammy Award for Best Classical Crossover Album for his work on Calling All Dawns, an album by Christopher Tin (himself an alumnus of the Stanford a cappella group Talisman). By the mid-2010s, Hare was working with nearly every top a cappella group, including Sing-Off winners Nota, Home Free, and Pentatonix, with whom he received 2x multi-platinum certification for their album That's Christmas to Me.

As of 2020, Hare has shifted his focus away from United States a cappella toward European and international a cappella groups. For the shift, Hare cites an increasing degree of same-ness in the industry, in part due to the widespread adoption of his techniques.

== Engineering style and techniques ==
Before Hare, a cappella was generally recorded exactly as a listener would perceive a live performance: with two microphones capturing the whole group at once, singing in a room. At the turn of the 1990s, over the course of a few albums with Stanford collegiate a cappella groups, Hare developed a new style: This involved recording every voice as one would record instruments: each voice with its own microphone, and each singer just a few inches away from their microphone. Placing all the voices so close to the listener's ear created an entirely new sound in a cappella recording, with increased presence for each voice. Additionally, a cappella pre-1990s generally included no percussive elements; Hare was one of the first to implement vocal percussion in the style of real drum kits.

== Legacy and impact ==
Contemporary A Cappella Society founder and longtime president Deke Sharon has said of Hare and his influence on recorded a cappella: "The sound of contemporary recorded a cappella owes more to [Bill Hare's] technique, style, and pioneering than any other person." Palo Alto Weekly described him as "widely considered the patriarch of a cappella recording". In his memoir Pitch Perfect: The Quest for Collegiate A Cappella Glory (which was later adapted into the blockbuster film Pitch Perfect), Mickey Rapkin said of Hare's influence: "In many ways, the history of collegiate a cappella recording is the Bill Hare story. Bill Hare is sort of like the Dr. Dre of a cappella recording."

== Awards and recognition ==
Hare has won one Grammy Award: for his work recording and engineering Christopher Tin's 2009 album, Calling All Dawns. Hare's recording, mixing and mastering work includes some of a cappella's best-selling albums of all time, including Pentatonix's That's Christmas to Me (certified 2x Multi-Platinum).

Hare has also won more awards related to recorded a cappella than any other producer. Since his work began in 1988, Hare has mixed and mastered more than 70 tracks selected for Varsity Vocals' annual Best of College A Cappella albums, has received more than 100 Contemporary A Cappella Recording Awards nominations, has had 40 albums in the Recorded A Cappella Review Board's "Picks of the Year" lists, and has received 13 awards in the Vocal Jazz category from DownBeat Magazine.

== Selected work ==
Hare is one of a cappella's most prolific recording, mixing and mastering engineers. Albums he has worked on include:

- Aquapella (1989), an album by the Stanford Mendicants
- 50-Minute Fun Break (1992), an album by the Stanford Fleet Street Singers
- Unbroken (2003), an album by The House Jacks
- Fleet Street (2004), an album by the Stanford Fleet Street Singers
- Pandaemonium (2007), an album by the Tufts Beelzebubs
- Play the Game (2009), an album by the Tufts Beelzebubs
- Ferris Wheels (2009), an album by the Swingle Singers
- Nota (2010), the debut album of Nota
- Great American Songbook (2013), an album by the King's Singers
- Southern Autumn Nostalgia (2013), an album by Street Corner Symphony
- PTX Vol. II (2013), an EP by Pentatonix
- That's Christmas to Me (2014), an album by Pentatonix
