= Stanford Counterpoint =

Stanford University a cappella vocal group

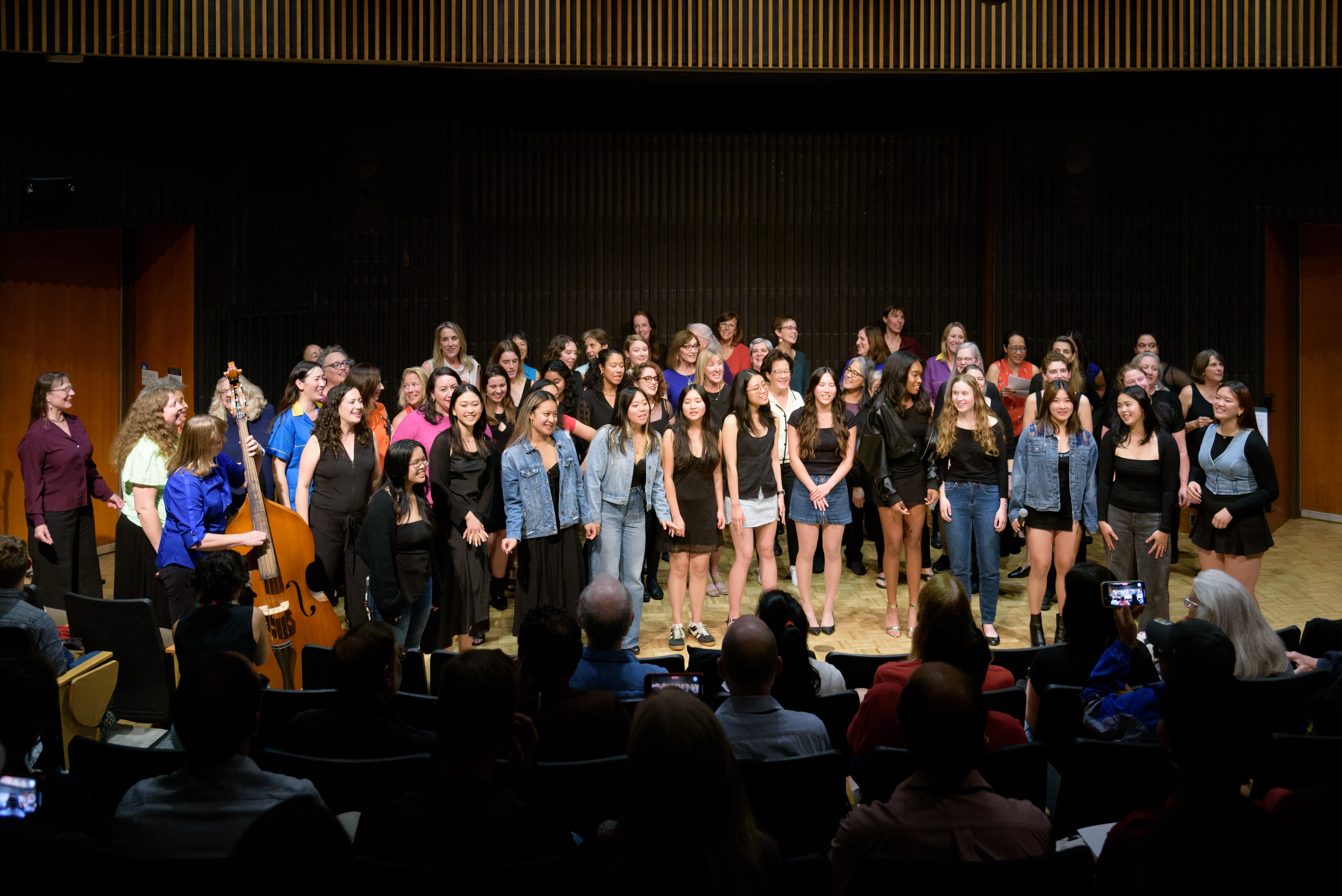
- Stanford Counterpoint 45th Reunion Show in 2024

Background information
- Origin: Stanford, California, USA
- Genre: A cappella
- Years active: 1979–present
- Website: www.stanfordcounterpoint.com

Stanford Counterpoint (also known simply as Counterpoint) is an all-femme a cappella group from Stanford University. It is the second-oldest a cappella group from Stanford.

Counterpoint is a student-led group, and typically comprises 15–17 singers, selected by audition each September. As of 2020, Counterpoint has released fourteen studio albums. The group has been nominated for a dozen national a cappella awards, and has been featured three times on Varsity Vocals' annual Best Of College A Cappella album.

== History ==
The group was founded in 1979 by sophomores Linda Chin and Joyce Rogers, to provide a female-oriented alternative to the Stanford Mendicants, an all-male group and the only a cappella group on campus at the time. The group was named "Counterpoint" because Rogers played the Harpsichord in high school and the concept of musical counterpoint is essential to the Baroque music she enjoyed playing. At first, the women of Counterpoint performed with an upright bass and occasional other instruments. The group's first performed song ("Java Jive") featured an upright bass and received a standing ovation at their first performance in the spring of 1979.

That first year, the group won the Stanford Alumni Association's award for the "most innovative student project" of the year.

In 1980, Counterpoint took The Mendicants on a tour to perform for Stanford alumni in Southern California; as of 2019, that tradition continues—as does the lasting relationship between the groups. In 1982, Counterpoint released a self-titled vinyl record, recorded in Stanford's Memorial Church.

In the 1990s, the group ceased using instruments and became all-vocal. Counterpoint recorded a studio album every other year, touring the United States during the years they didn't record. In 2019, the women of Counterpoint went on their first international tour to Paris, France. Also in 2019, Stanford Counterpoint celebrated their 40th anniversary with a reunion concert featuring generations of alumnae.

In 2019, Stanford Counterpoint released their 14th studio album (Close to Home) and an accompanying music video for the track "God is a Woman". Both works are entirely performed/recorded/produced by women. The track "Light of a Clear Blue Morning" was selected for the Recorded A Cappella Review Board's 2019 "Picks of the Year" and their music video for has been nominated for an A Cappella Video Award.

As of 2020, Counterpoint has been nominated for 14 a cappella recording-related awards and honors including Contemporary A Cappella Recording Award (CARA) award nominations and Best Of College A Cappella (BOCA) compilation album features. Many of these nominations were thanks to the work of Counterpoint's long-time audio engineer Bill Hare.

== Discography ==
As of 2020, Counterpoint has released fourteen studio albums:

- Counterpoint (1981)
- Run With It (1989)
- Sing It, Baby! (1992)
- Nomansland (1996)
- Counterculture (1998)
- Ticket to Anywhere (2000)
- Cover Charge (2002)
- Studio Confessions (2004)
- Lights in the Rearview (2006)
- Belladonna (2008)
- Dancing Til Dawn (2010)
- No Turning Back (2015)
- A Woman Like That (2016) - EP
- Close to Home (2019)

== Awards and nominations ==
Year	Award	Category	Nominee(s)	Result	Ref.
1997	Contemporary A Cappella Recording Awards	Best Female Collegiate Album	Nomansland	Nominated	
1999	Contemporary A Cappella Recording Awards	Best Female Collegiate Album	Counterculture	Nominated	
1999	Contemporary A Cappella Recording Awards	Best Female Collegiate Song	"Don't Speak"	Nominated	
1999	Contemporary A Cappella Recording Awards	Best Female Collegiate Arrangement	Katy Chow	Nominated	
1999	Contemporary A Cappella Recording Awards	Best Female Collegiate Soloist	Sasha Polonsky	Nominated	
2001	Contemporary A Cappella Recording Awards	Best Female Collegiate Album	Ticket to Anywhere	Nominated	
2001	Contemporary A Cappella Recording Awards	Best Female Collegiate Song	"Good Enough"	Nominated	
2001	Contemporary A Cappella Recording Awards	best Female Collegiate Arrangement	Katy Chow for "Crush"	Nominated	
2005	Contemporary A Cappella Recording Awards	Best Female Collegiate Song	"Clocks" from Studio Confessions	Nominated	
2009	Contemporary A Cappella Recording Awards	Best Female Collegiate Album	Belladona	Shortlisted	
2019	A Cappella Video Awards	Best Female Collegiate Video	"Don't Wake Me Up"	Runner Up	
2020	A Cappella Video Awards	Best Female Collegiate Video	"God Is a Woman"	Nominated	
2020	Contemporary A Cappella Recording Awards	Best Country Song	"Light of a Clear Blue Morning" from Close to Home	Nominated	

=== Best of College A Cappella appearances ===
Three songs released by Counterpoint have been selected for Varsity Vocals’ annual Best of College A Cappella album.

Year	Song title	Originally performed by	Reference
1999	“Don't Speak”	Bonnie Raitt	
2001	“Good Enough”	Sarah McLachlan	
2007	“Breathe (2 AM)”	Anna Nalick	

== See also ==
- List of Stanford University a cappella groups
