= List of awards and nominations received by Tim Burton =

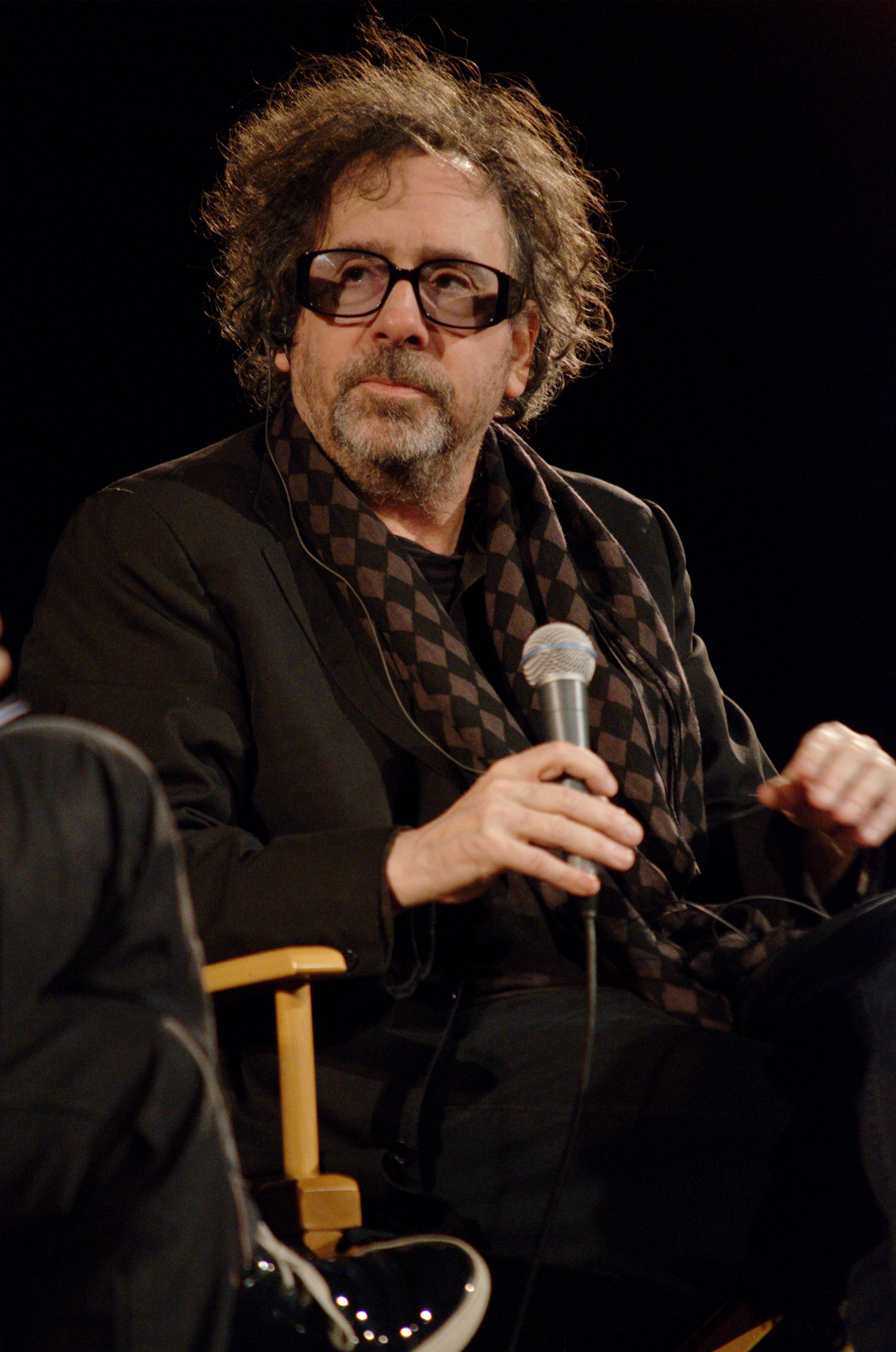
Burton at the Cinémathèque Française in 2012

This article is a list of awards and nominations received by Tim Burton.

He has received numerous accolades including an Emmy Award, as well as nominations for two Academy Awards, a Golden Globe Award and three BAFTA Awards. He has also received several honorary awards including the Venice International Film Festival's Golden Lion for Lifetime Achievement in 2007 and was given The Order of the Arts and Letters by Culture Minister of France in 2010.

== Major associations ==
=== Academy Awards ===
Year	Category	Nominated work	Result	Ref.
2006	Best Animated Feature	Corpse Bride	Nominated	
2013	Best Animated Feature	Frankenweenie	Nominated	

Directed Academy Award-nominated performances
Under Burton's direction, these actors have received Academy Award nominations for their performances in their respective roles.

Year	Performer	Film	Result
Best Actor
2007	Johnny Depp	Sweeney Todd: The Demon Barber of Fleet Street	Nominated
Best Supporting Actor
1994	Martin Landau	Ed Wood	Won

=== BAFTA Awards ===
Year	Category	Nominated work	Result
British Academy Film Awards
2003	Best Direction	Big Fish	Nominated
2003	Best Film	Big Fish	Nominated
2012	Best Animated Film	Frankenweenie	Nominated
British Academy Children's Awards
2005	Best Feature Film	Charlie and the Chocolate Factory	Nominated

Directed BAFTA Award-nominated performances
Under Burton's direction, these actors have received BAFTA Award nominations for their performances in their respective roles.

Year	Performer	Film	Result
Best Actress
2014	Amy Adams	Big Eyes	Nominated
Best Supporting Actor
1989	Jack Nicholson	Batman	Nominated
1995	Martin Landau	Ed Wood	Nominated
2003	Albert Finney	Big Fish	Nominated

=== Emmy Award ===
Year	Category	Nominated work	Result	Ref.
Primetime Emmy Awards
2023	Outstanding Comedy Series	Wednesday: Season 1	Nominated	
2023	Outstanding Directing for a Comedy Series	Wednesday: "Wednesday's Child Is Full of Woe"	Nominated	
Daytime Emmy Awards
1990	Outstanding Animated Program	Beetlejuice: Season 1	Won	

=== Golden Globe Awards ===
Year	Category	Nominated work	Result
2008	Best Director	Sweeney Todd: The Demon Barber of Fleet Street	Nominated

Directed Golden Globe Award-nominated performances
Under Burton's direction, these actors have received Golden Globe Award nominations for their performances in their respective roles.

Year	Performer	Film	Result
Best Actor in a Motion Picture – Musical or Comedy
1989	Jack Nicholson	Batman	Nominated
1990	Johnny Depp	Edward Scissorhands	Nominated
1994	Johnny Depp	Ed Wood	Nominated
2005	Johnny Depp	Charlie and the Chocolate Factory	Nominated
2007	Johnny Depp	Sweeney Todd: The Demon Barber of Fleet Street	Won
2010	Johnny Depp	Alice in Wonderland	Nominated
2014	Christoph Waltz	Big Eyes	Nominated
Best Actress in a Motion Picture – Musical or Comedy
2007	Helena Bonham Carter	Sweeney Todd: The Demon Barber of Fleet Street	Nominated
2014	Amy Adams	Big Eyes	Won
Best Supporting Actor
1994	Martin Landau	Ed Wood	Won
2003	Albert Finney	Big Fish	Nominated
Best Actress – Television Series Musical or Comedy
2022	Jenna Ortega	Wednesday (Season 1)	Nominated
2025	Jenna Ortega	Wednesday (Season 2)	Nominated

== Industry awards ==
=== Cannes Film Festival ===
Year	Category	Nominated work	Result
1994	Palme d'Or	Ed Wood	Nominated

=== Chicago Film Critics Association Awards ===
Year	Category	Nominated work	Result
2003	Best Director	Big Fish	Nominated

=== National Board of Review Awards ===
Year	Category	Nominated work	Result
2007	Best Director	Sweeney Todd: The Demon Barber of Fleet Street	Won

=== Producers Guild of America Awards ===
Year	Category	Nominated work	Result
2006	Best Animated Motion Picture	Corpse Bride	Nominated
2009	Best Animated Motion Picture	9	Nominated
2013	Best Animated Motion Picture	Frankenweenie	Nominated

== Miscellaneous awards ==
=== Inkpot Award ===
- (2009)

=== Lacanian Psychoanalysis Prize ===
- (2010) Won—Alice in Wonderland

=== Saturn Awards ===
Year	Nominated work	Category	Result
1990	Beetlejuice	Best Director	Nominated
1990	Edward Scissorhands	Best Fantasy Film	Won
1993	Batman Returns	Best Fantasy Film	Nominated
1993	Batman Returns	Best Director	Nominated
1994	The Nightmare Before Christmas	Best Fantasy Film	Won
1997	Mars Attacks!	Best Director	Nominated
2000	Sleepy Hollow	Best Director	Nominated
2006	Corpse Bride	Best Animated Film	Won
2008	Sweeney Todd: The Demon Barber of Fleet Street	Best Director	Nominated
2013	Frankenweenie	Best Animated Film	Won

=== Scream Awards ===
- (2008) Honored — Scream Immortal Award, for his unique interpretation of horror and fantasy

== Honorary Awards ==
=== Imagine Film Festival ===
- (2008) Career Achievement Award

=== The Order of Arts and Letters ===
- (2010) Knighted by Culture Minister of France

=== Moscow International Film Festival ===
- (2012) "Golden George" for his contribution to world cinema.

=== David di Donatello Awards ===
- (2019) "Honorary David di Donatello"

=== Lumière Festival ===
- (2022) Lumière Award for Lifetime Achievement

=== Venice International Film Festival ===
- (2007) Honored—Golden Lion for Lifetime Achievement
