= Stanford Everyday People =

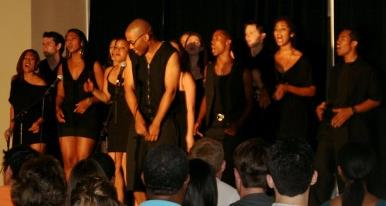
- Everyday People performing at Stanford in 2010

Background information
- Origin: Stanford University
- Genres: Hip hop, R&B, Motown, Soul music, A cappella
- Years active: 1987–present
- Website: http://everydaypeople.org/wp/

Stanford Everyday People, popularly known as EP, is Stanford University's only Hip-Hop, R&B, Motown and Soul a cappella group. The group is known for its tight, soulful sound and wearing all black. It was founded in 1987 and has released ten studio albums to date. EP has toured the United States, Jamaica and the Bahamas.

== History ==
Founded in 1987 by Stanford University juniors Larry Shorter and Tony Stovall, the group's name is a tribute to Sly and the Family Stone's vision of inclusiveness and acceptance of all races, genders, and creeds as well as their 1967 hit of the same title.

In 2017, EP performed with artists Wiz Khalifa and Ouyang Nana at the Breakthrough Prize awards ceremony.

In addition to performing at campus and Bay Area events, EP has toured the United States, Jamaica and the Bahamas.

EP is an entirely student-run organization: the arrangements in its repertoire have all been arranged and transcribed by its own members, past and present. While EP generally performs with a group of 8-16 singers, graduating members always remain a part of the group.

== Discography ==
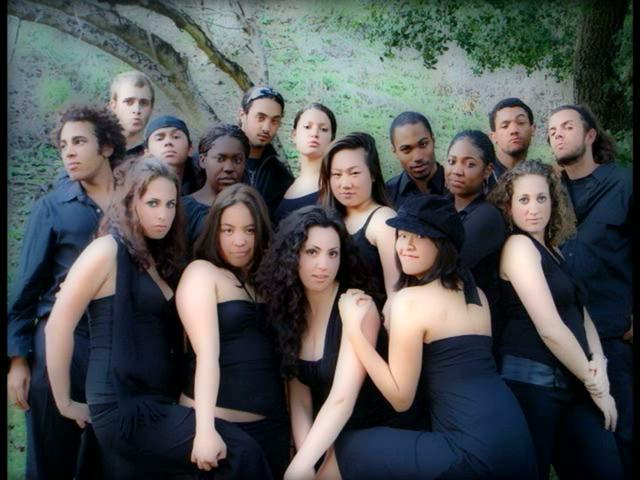
EP at Stanford, ~2005

- Dress Black (1989)
- Shades of Soul (1993)
- Wail (1996)
- 2648 West Grand Blvd. (1998)
- EP Jones (1999)
- Extended Play (2001)
- Lovespeak (2004)
- The Next Episode (2009)
- The Sweetest (2014)
- Evolution (2018) - EP

== Awards and nominations ==
Year	Award	Category	Nominee(s)	Result	Ref.
1994	Contemporary A Cappella Recording Awards	Best Mixed Collegiate Soloist	Sean White	Runner-up	
1997	Contemporary A Cappella Recording Awards	Best Mixed Collegiate Soloist	Osi Imeokparia	Runner-up	
1997	Contemporary A Cappella Recording Awards	Best Mixed Collegiate Soloist	Crystal McCreary	Nominated	
1999	Contemporary A Cappella Recording Awards	Best Mixed Collegiate Album	2648 West Grand Blvd	Runner-up	
1999	Contemporary A Cappella Recording Awards	Best Mixed Collegiate Song	"You're All I Need to Get By"	Runner-up	
1999	Contemporary A Cappella Recording Awards	Best Mixed Collegiate Soloist	Crystal McCreary	Runner-up	
2000	Contemporary A Cappella Recording Awards	Best Mixed Collegiate Album	EP Jones	Won	
2000	Contemporary A Cappella Recording Awards	Best Mixed Collegiate Song	"The House That Jack Built"	Runner-up	
2000	Contemporary A Cappella Recording Awards	Best Mixed Collegiate Arrangement	Kevin Kumar	Nominated	
2000	Contemporary A Cappella Recording Awards	Best Mixed Collegiate Soloist	Mariama White-Hammond	Nominated	
2002	Contemporary A Cappella Recording Awards	Best Mixed Collegiate Album	Extended Play	Runner-up	
2002	Contemporary A Cappella Recording Awards	Best Mixed Collegiate Song	"Spend My Life With You"	Nominated	
2002	Contemporary A Cappella Recording Awards	Best Mixed Collegiate Soloist	Nathan Reed for "I Do"	Nominated	
2005	Contemporary A Cappella Recording Awards	Best Mixed Collegiate Album	Lovespeak	Runner-up	
2005	Contemporary A Cappella Recording Awards	Best Mixed Collegiate Solo	Cindy Lou for "Save Your Love For Me"	Won	

=== ICCA results ===
The International Championship of Collegiate A Cappella (ICCA) first judged live a cappella performance competitions in 1996.

Year	Level	Category	Recipient(s)	Result	Citation
1997	West Region Quarterfinal #3	Best Solo	Christine Chang for "We Belong"	Runner-up	
1998	West Region Quarterfinal #1	Best Group	Everyday People	2nd	
1998	West Region Quarterfinal #1	Best Soloist	Marcy Komae for "You're All I Need to Get By"	Won	
2001	West Region Quarterfinal #3	Best Group	Everyday People	3rd	
2001	West Region Quarterfinal #3	Best Soloist	Mariama White-Hammond	Won	
2001	West Region Quarterfinal #3	Best Soloist	Nathan Reed	Runner-up	
2002	West Region Quarterfinal #2	Best Group	Everyday People	1st	
2002	West Region Quarterfinal #2	Best Soloist	Nathan Reed	Won	
2002	West Region Quarterfinal #2	Best Soloist	Eric Lee and Gabrielle Slaughter	Runner-up (tie)	
2002	West Region Quarterfinal #2	Best Intro	"Papa Was a Rollin' Stone"	Won	
2002	West Region Semifinal	Best Soloist	Nathan Reed	Runner-up	
2005	West Region Quarterfinal #4	Best Group	Everyday People	3rd	
2005	West Region Semifinal	Outstanding Soloist	Carryn Kunz for "You're All I Need to Get By"	Won	

== Notable alumni ==
Notable alumni include:

- Actor Barney Cheng
- Award-winning singer-songwriter Jamie Green
- Singer-songwriters and producers Kevin and Sean Kumar
- Broadway actress Katie Nutt
- Jazz vocalist Katie Nutt
- Prince Fahad Al-Saud of Saudi Arabia.

== See also ==
- List of Stanford University a cappella groups
