= Stanford Fleet Street Singers =

Stanford University a cappella vocal group

The Stanford Fleet Street Singers
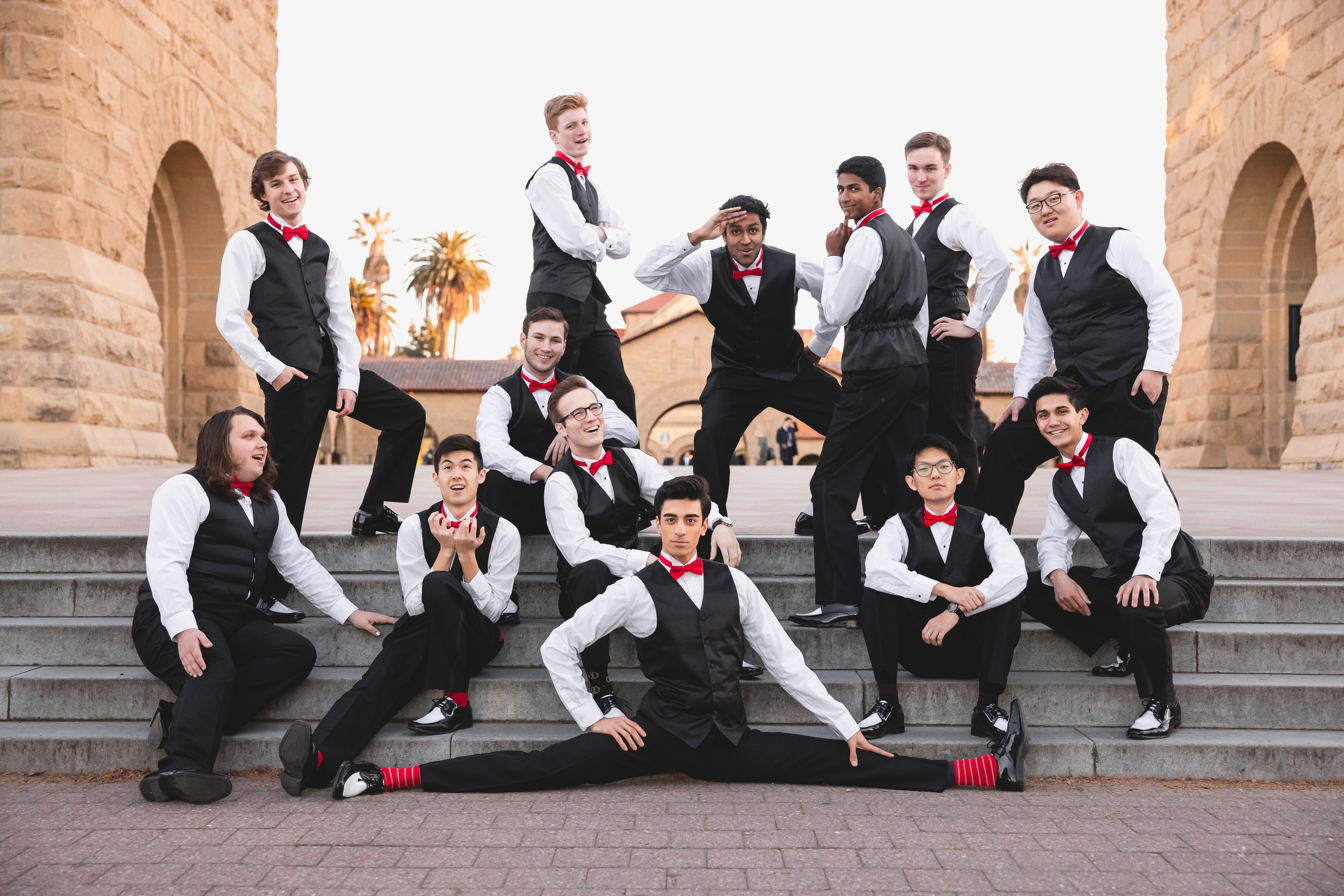
- The Stanford Fleet Street Singers at Stanford's Main Quad in 2019, wearing their characteristic outfits

Background information
- Also known as: Fleet Street
- Origin: Stanford, California, United States
- Genres: A cappella; Musical comedy; Parody; Surreal humor
- Years active: 1981–present
- Website: www.fleetstreet.com

The Stanford Fleet Street Singers (Fleet Street) is a comedy a cappella group from Stanford University. The group performs original songs and sketch comedy, and wears a uniform of black vests and red bow ties. Fleet Street is perhaps best known for having published the first collegiate a cappella album composed entirely of original music. In total, Fleet Street has released 13 studio albums and has received a dozen national awards.

Fleet Street was founded in 1981, as a collegiate a cappella group focused on comedy, theatricality, and barbershop harmony. In its early years, the group arranged and performed many Stanford-related songs (which they often subverted for humorous effect), which earned them large audiences among Stanford students and alumni. Alongside a turn to more popular music, the 1990s saw Fleet Street gain national prominence, sweeping the Contemporary A Cappella Recording Awards, appearing on national television (The Today Show) and radio programs (The Dr. Demento Show), at the Lincoln Center in New York City, and overseas (at the Edinburgh Fringe Festival). In 2004, Fleet Street published their self-titled, entirely original album (the first such album in collegiate a cappella) to critical acclaim; this ushered in a new era for the group, defined by a focus on original music.

The name "Fleet Street" is a reference to the musical Sweeney Todd: The Demon Barber of Fleet Street, itself a nod to the group's musical roots in barbershop music. The group typically comprises a rotating set of 12 to 16 students, with new members selected by audition each September. Alumni of the group include technology executives, academics, Broadway actors, and comedy writers.

== History ==
=== 1981–1991: Stanford patronage ===
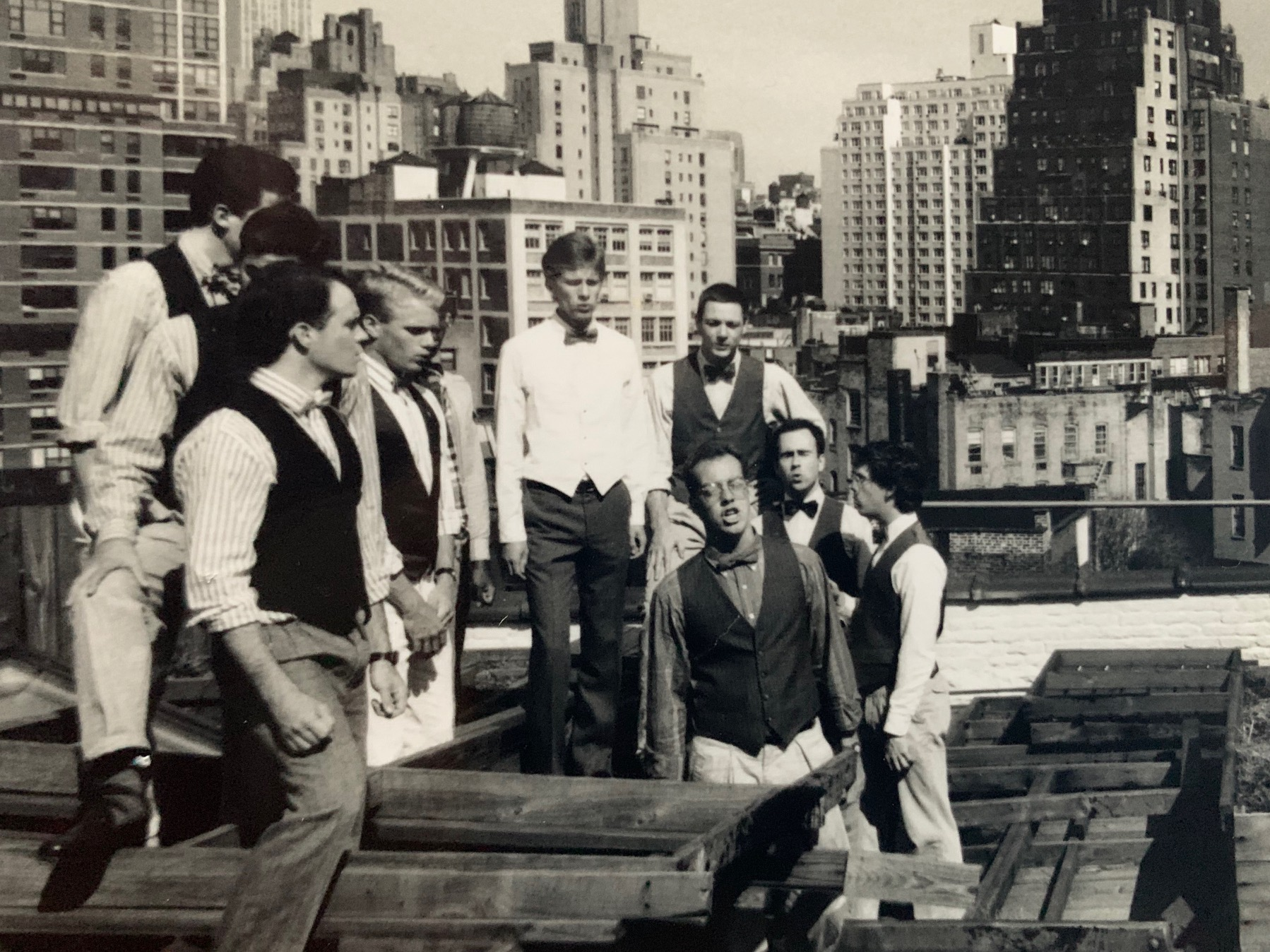
The Stanford Fleet Street Singers on tour to New York City, c. 1990

Fleet Street was formed in 1981, after a few years as a loosely defined barbershop quartet. As freshmen, students Timothy Biglow, Kyle Kashima, and Chris Tucci had been turned down after auditioning for the Stanford Mendicants, Stanford's only male a cappella group at the time. As juniors, they formed the Fleet Street Singers with an emphasis on barbershop harmony, theatricality, and humor.

The group's earliest performances were free and took place on the Stanford campus, in dormitories, and at social events. The group's early repertoire included barbershop arrangements of Stanford standards and fight songs, such as "Hail, Stanford, Hail!" and "Come Join the Band". A dozen of these arrangements were written and ultimately recorded for the A side of Fleet Street's first record, Songs of the Stanford Red (1984). The B side comprised ten songs from Fleet Street's other repertoire: jazz standards and more comedic arrangements.

The two sides of the group's repertoire were not always kept separate; the group often subverted traditional songs for humorous effect. They performed a parody of UC Berkeley's official fight song, with alternative lyrics lampooning the rival school's mascot ("The Dirty Golden Bear"). In 1987, Fleet Street reinterpreted the university's century-old alma mater ("Hail, Stanford, Hail!") as a rap, which earned them renown within the community. The Stanford Daily called it "a performance that characterizes the group's combination of music and comedy" and reported by 1990 its use at official university events including freshman orientation, fundraisers, and Big Game. From 1990 to 1992, Fleet Street also performed the hymn at the university's commencement ceremonies in Stanford Stadium. Each time, after the audience chanted "Rap! Rap! Rap!", Fleet Street also performed their rap version of the hymn. In 1991, Fleet Street was selected to be part of Stanford's National Centennial Celebration (celebrating 100 years since the university's founding); the group was flown to cities around the United States to sing the university's fight songs for alumni.

=== 1992–2003: Growing prominence ===
At the turn of the 1990s, Fleet Street broadened their repertoire, becoming well known on Stanford campus for their medleys, like that of songs from the TV show Schoolhouse Rock!, or that of songs by Duran Duran. By 1992, their annual spring show filled Stanford's 1700-seat Memorial Auditorium. Having become well-established at school, Fleet Street began pursuing projects beyond Stanford's campus.

In early 1992, Fleet Street released 50-Minute Fun Break, their fourth studio album and their second collaboration with audio engineer Bill Hare. It featured the first synthesis of Hare's innovative studio recording techniques, which would go on to define the sound of recorded a cappella. The album was generally well-received; a critic for the Recorded A Cappella Review Board (RARB) wrote, "Of all of the collegiate albums I have heard, this is the one that I would recommend most readily. If I could have only one collegiate album, this would be it." At the Contemporary A Cappella Recording Awards, the album won awards in five categories, a new record at the Awards. At the time of the album's release, however, its studio engineering polarized a cappella critics. On the one hand, critics praised the album, saying "[Fleet Street's] studio engineering work is incredible", and, "This is technically one of the best albums I've heard from the collegiate scene." On the other hand, some critics criticized the studio work, calling it "intrusive", "unnatural", and "strange". For its part, the Contemporary A Cappella Society praised the album's engineering, awarding it Best Mixing and Engineering and calling it "the best engineering we've ever heard on any collegiate album. Ever."

Over the summer break in 1992, Fleet Street performed in a weeklong appearance at the Edinburgh Fringe Festival, their first show outside North America. The festival's program notes called Fleet Street "one of the U.S.'s premiere a cappella groups", and praised them for their theatrical style, musicianship, and "outlandish humour". In February 1996, Fleet Street participated in the International Championship of Collegiate A Cappella and won Best Overall Group Performance on the West Coast, advancing to the championship's finals. That April, the group performed in the finals at David Geffen Hall (called Avery Fisher Hall at the time) in New York City's Lincoln Center, and performed on national television with The Today Show.

In March 1996, World Champion figure skater Rudy Galindo skated to Fleet Street's recording of "Ave Maria" for his exhibition program at the World Figure Skating Championships. Galindo later wrote that he found the recording "so spiritual and moving" that "the voices of the choir lift me to another state of mind, and it feels as if I'm floating." Following that performance, Galindo skated to Fleet Street's cover of Bette Midler's "The Rose" in late 1999 at both Ice Wars and at the World Professional Figure Skating Championship.

Fleet Street appeared on national radio for the first time in 1999, when their parody song "Web Surfin'" appeared in The Dr. Demento Radio Show's "Funny Five" list (best known for popularizing "Weird Al" Yankovic). As of 2020, Fleet Street has been featured on the radio show 13 times.

Their 2001 album Fearless received mixed-to-positive reviews from the RARB. The track "Greatest Hits of the 1590s" was described by a cappella critic Rebecca Christie as a "parody medley that [is] the best of its kind" with modern pop hooks "sung in madrigal fashion".

=== 2004–present: Original music ===
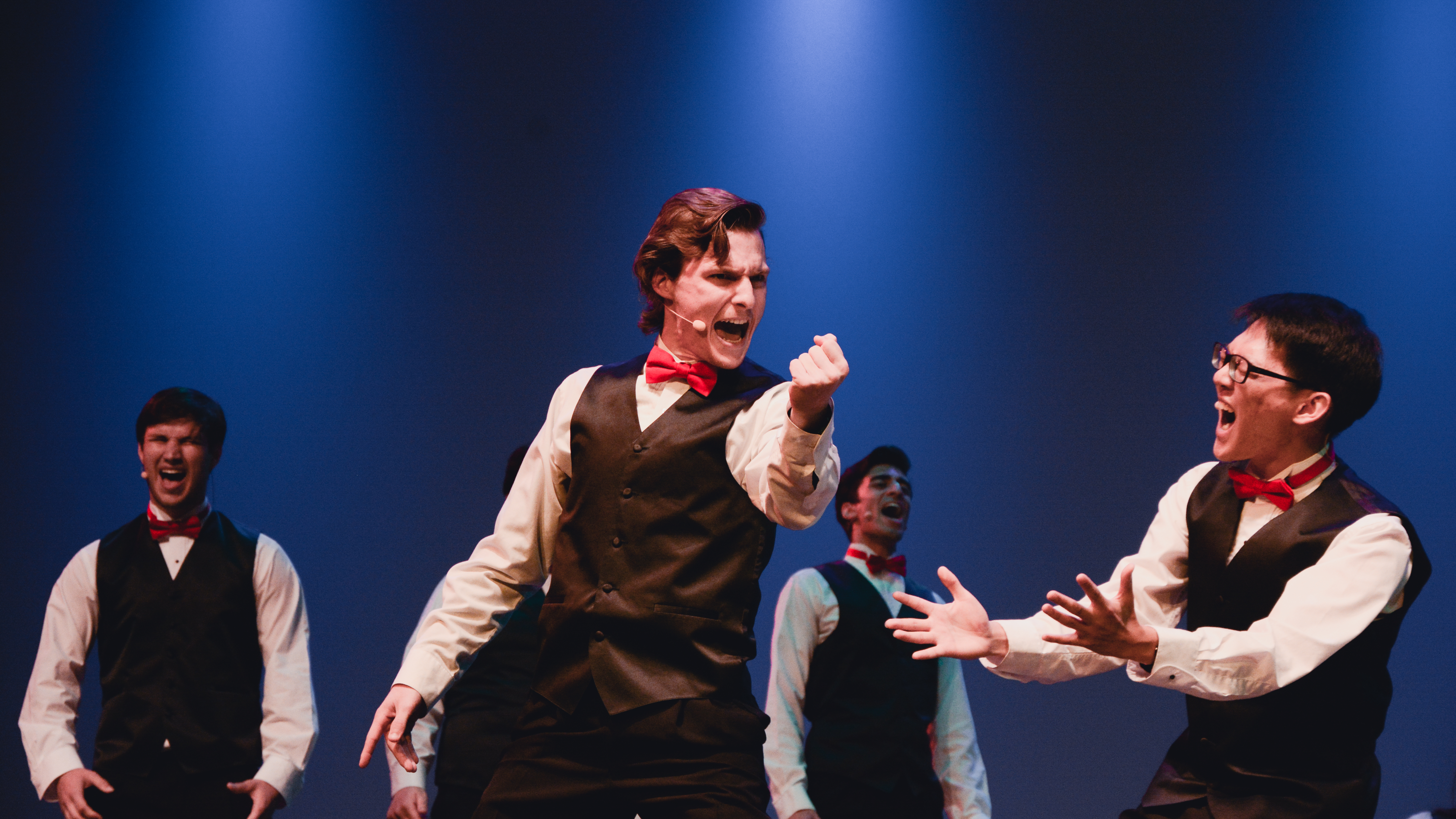
The Stanford Fleet Street Singers during a 2019 performance

In 2004, Fleet Street released their eleventh studio album, Fleet Street, the first album in collegiate a cappella to be composed entirely of original songs. (Note: Fleet Street began writing and releasing original comedic songs as part of the 1990s' repertoire expansion (as early as 1988 and more consistently beginning in 1992).) The album was well-received, drawing praise for its lyrics and for the broad scope of its 15 original songs. Contemporary A Cappella Society president Deke Sharon called it "the most important collegiate a cappella album to be released in a decade". Noting that Sharon had urged collegiate groups to pursue original material, Broadway producer and a cappella critic Elie Landau said that Fleet Street had "answered Deke's call with probably the most gutsy and original collegiate album I've listened to in almost 20 years of active collegiate a cappella listening."

In 2010, Fleet Street participated in America's Got Talent, reaching the second round in New York City. In 2018, Fleet Street performed twice on National Public Radio. In 2019, Fleet Street began producing music videos. One video, a diss track on Harvard University, went viral with 2.8 million views; another, an original song about pulling an all-nighter, earned the group its first A Cappella Video Award.

As of 2020, Fleet Street is best known for their original, often humorous songs, such as "Prayer to the God of Partial Credit", "Everyone Pees in the Shower", and "Greatest Hits of the 1590s". In interviews, musical directors have emphasized the group's originality, calling it "one of the most important things we focus on". They describe Fleet Street's creative songwriting process as organic and highly collaborative. Apart from music, Fleet Street is known for incorporating videos, sketch comedy, computer-animated films, and elaborate sets into their live performances.

== Group identity ==
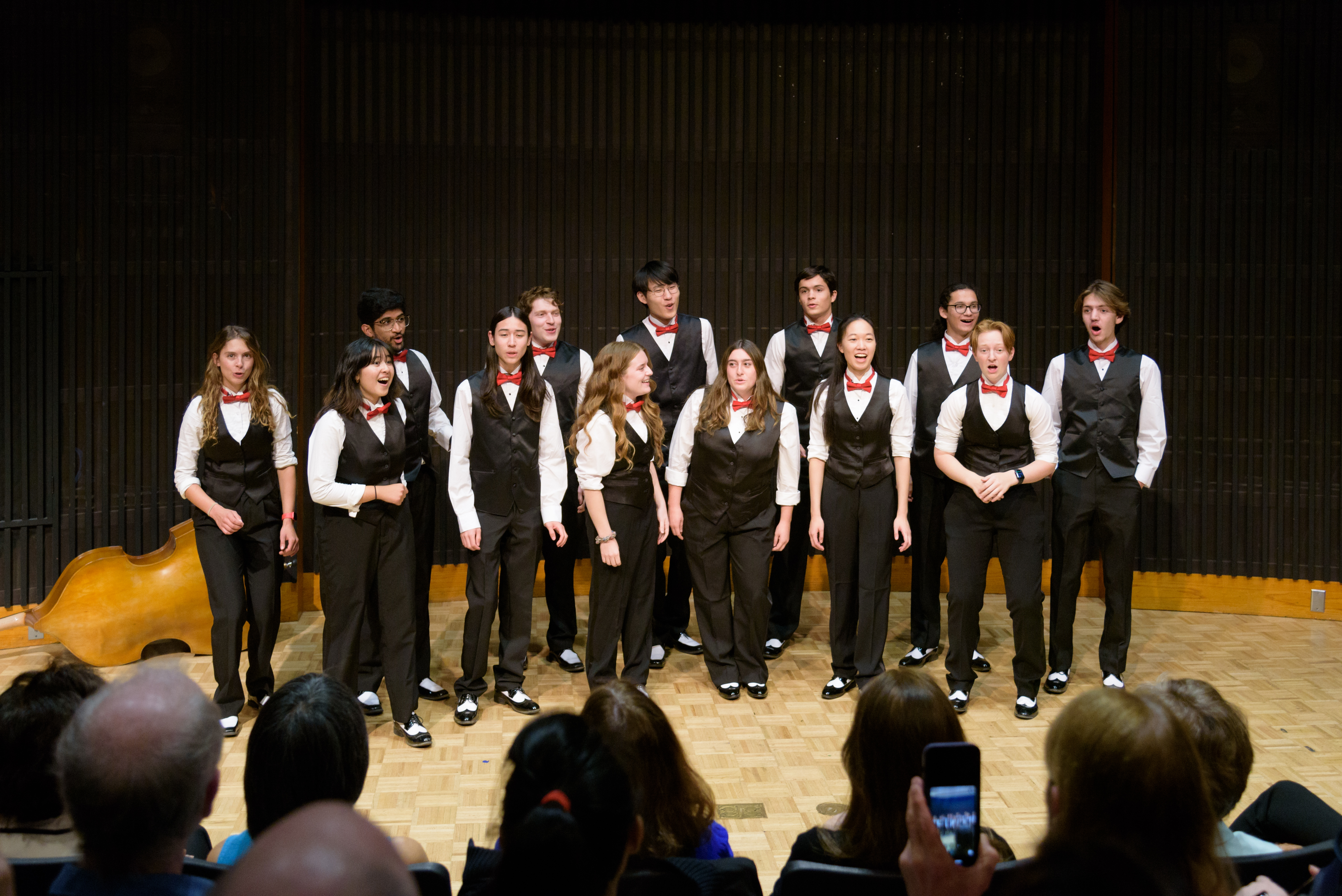
Fleet Street in 2024, now a co-ed group

In a 2010 interview, music director Julian Kusnadi said, "We're not very concerned about being typical!" That perspective has run in the group for decades: "This is not something that singing groups normally do," said singer Rob Morris when interviewed about a Star Wars-themed computer-animated short film the group made in 1997, at a cost of 1,000 hours and $2,500. In 2010, The Stanford Daily described Fleet Street as "characterized by its creativity and off-the-wall silliness". In 2011, The Daily reported on Fleet Street's May show, calling it, "filled with the silly, goofball antics the tuxedoed singers are known for."

Fleet Street is a student-led organization; the group's music director, business manager, and singers are always Stanford students. The group consists of a rotating set of 12–16 members, with new members selected each September through two rounds of auditions. At auditions, students are asked to bring a joke, and are assessed on how well they blend with the group vocally.

Fleet Street wears a uniform of black tuxedo vests and red bowties, a staple of the group since its founding. Penguins also feature heavily in the group's visual identity, appearing on the covers of eight of their eleven albums. The name "Fleet Street" is a reference to the musical Sweeney Todd: The Demon Barber of Fleet Street, itself a nod to the group's musical roots in barbershop music.

As of 2022, Fleet Street became a co-ed group.

== Discography ==
As of 2020, Fleet Street has released 13 full-length albums:

- Songs of the Stanford Red (1984)
- Full Moon at the Quad (1988)
- curious... (1990)
- 50-Minute Fun Break (1992)
- What You Want (1994)
- Greatest Hits & Skits: Volumes 1 and 2 (1996)
- All The Rage (1998)
- Stanford: Up Toward Mountains Higher (1999)
- Fearless (2001)
- Fleet Street (2004)
- Through The Roof (2010)
- Cold Fury (2017)

== Awards and nominations ==
=== Recordings ===
Before 1992, there were no awards organizations related to a cappella. The Contemporary A Cappella Society announced Recording Awards for the first time in 1992. As of 2020, Fleet Street has won ten such awards.

Year	Award	Category	Nominee(s)	Result	Ref.
1993 (Note: Before 1992, there were no awards organizations related to a cappella.)	Contemporary A Cappella Recording Awards	Best Male Collegiate Album	50-Minute Fun Break (1992)	Won	
1993	Contemporary A Cappella Recording Awards	Best Male Collegiate Song	"You Always Hurt the One You Love"	Won	
1993	Contemporary A Cappella Recording Awards	Best Original Collegiate Song	"Prayer to the God of Partial Credit" (Note: Original songs.)	Won	
1993	Contemporary A Cappella Recording Awards	Best Collegiate Cover Design	Gray Norton for 50-Minute Fun Break (1992)	Won	
1993	Contemporary A Cappella Recording Awards	Best Mixing and Engineering (Note: Open category; includes both collegiate and professional works.)	Ben Evans and Bill Hare for 50-Minute Fun Break (1992)	Won	
1995	Contemporary A Cappella Recording Awards	Male Collegiate Best Album	What You Want (1994)	Won	
1995	Contemporary A Cappella Recording Awards	Male Collegiate Best Song	"Ave Maria"	Won	
1995	Contemporary A Cappella Recording Awards	Male Collegiate Best Arrangement	"What's Opera, Doc?"	Runner-up	
1995	Contemporary A Cappella Recording Awards	Best Male Collegiate Soloist	Kevin Bleyer for "Black Coffee"	Won	
1999	Contemporary A Cappella Recording Awards	Best Male Collegiate Album	All The Rage (1998)	Nominated	
1999	Contemporary A Cappella Recording Awards	Best Male Collegiate Song	"Real Genius"	Nominated	
1999	Contemporary A Cappella Recording Awards	Best Male Collegiate Arrangement	John Niekrasz	Won	
2002	Contemporary A Cappella Recording Awards	Best Male Collegiate Arrangement	John Niekrasz for "Strange Meadow Lark" on Fearless (2001)	Nominated	
2005	Contemporary A Cappella Recording Awards	Best Humor Song	"Teen Angst" on Fleet Street (2004)	Nominated	
2011	Contemporary A Cappella Recording Awards	Best Humor Song	"Greatest Hits of the 1600s" on Through The Roof (2011)	Runner-up	
2020	A Cappella Video Awards	Best Humor Video	Music video: "All-Nighter"	Won	
2020	Contemporary A Cappella Recording Awards	Best Humor Song	“All-Nighter”	Runner-up	

=== Live competition ===
The International Championship of Collegiate A Cappella (ICCA) judged live a cappella performance competitions for the first time in 1996. That year, Fleet Street won the West Region semifinal and competed in the championships at Lincoln Center in New York City.

ICCA results for the Stanford Fleet Street Singers
Year	Level	Category	Recipient(s)	Result	Citation
1996 (Note: Before 1996, there were no awards dedicated to a cappella performance.)	West Region Semifinal	Best Group	Fleet Street Singers	1st	
1996	West Region Semifinal	Best Arrangement	Greg Chun for "Duran Duran Medley"	Won	
1997	West Region Quarterfinal #3	Best Group	Fleet Street Singers	2nd	
1997	West Region Quarterfinal #3	Best Solo	Nathan Reed for "Joyful, Joyful"	Won	
1997	West Region Quarterfinal #3	Best Arrangement	John Niekrasz for "William Tell Overture"	Won	
2004	West Region Quarterfinal #3	Best Group	Fleet Street Singers	3rd	
2004	West Region Quarterfinal #3	Outstanding Soloist	Ben Rosebrough	Won	
2004	West Region Quarterfinal #3	Outstanding Choreography	Fleet Street Singers	Won	
2005	West Region Quarterfinal #3	Best Group	Fleet Street Singers	2nd	

== Notable alumni ==
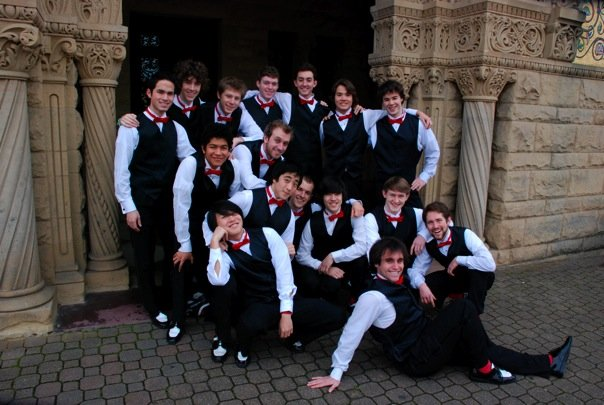
The Stanford Fleet Street Singers during the 2008–09 academic year

Fleet Street alumni (who are also, in general, alumni of Stanford University) include:

- Winter Wright (class of 1986), Vice President of Content Strategy, Huawei.
- Kevin Bleyer (class of 1993), comedy writer best known as a writer for The Daily Show with Jon Stewart, where he won four Emmy Awards, and as a writer for President Barack Obama's White House Correspondence Dinner speeches. For his solo on "Black Coffee", the Contemporary A Cappella Society commented, "Kevin [has] a future on Broadway with a voice this warm and effortless."
- Greg Chun (class of 1993), composer best known for his work with The Lonely Island and voice actor known for his work in anime and video games.
- Chad Dyer (class of 1993), Chief Information Officer, Sequoia Capital.
- Michael K. Lee (class of 1994), theater actor and singer with credits on Broadway productions of Miss Saigon (Thuy), Jesus Christ Superstar (Simon Zealotes), and Rent. In a 2002 interview, he described Fleet Street as "one of the pivotal points of my life".
- Jerry Cain (class of 1995), Senior Lecturer of Computer Science at Stanford and lead engineer of the original Facebook "Like" button.
- Nirav Tolia (class of 1995), Co-Founder and CEO of Nextdoor.
- Jeremy Henrickson (class of 1996), Chief Product Officer, Coinbase.
- David Wiesen (class of 1999), Co-Founder and Director of Engineering, Nextdoor.
- Ed Sylvanus Iskandar (class of 2004), Drama Desk Award–winning theater director. A New York Times Critics' Pick and TONY's Critics' Pick winner.

In 2000, Fleet Street alumni were among the founding members of The Richter Scales, an a cappella group from San Francisco, CA, that was active from 2000 to 2014. In 2008, Fleet Street alumnus Matt Hempey led that group to win the Webby Award for Best Viral Video with their a cappella parody, "Here Comes Another Bubble".

== See also ==
- List of Stanford University a cappella groups
