= Stanford Raagapella =

- Origin: Stanford University, Stanford, California, United States
- Genres: World music, Bollywood music, Indian music, Pop music, A cappella,
- Years active: 2002–present
- Website: www.raagapella.com

Stanford Raagapella (abbreviated Raag) is Stanford University's South Asian focus a cappella group. The group was founded as an all-male group in 2002 and transitioned to an all-gender group in 2017. Stanford Raagapella has released three albums to date, Raags to Riches, Raag Time and Raagstars. Raagapella regularly performs on campus in events hosted by the group itself as well as by organizations such as Stanford Sanskriti, the South Asian cultural organization. Stanford Raagapella has toured the United States and India, performing with artists such as A.R. Rahman. The group's repertoire consists of world music, much of which originates in South Asia, and Western songs.

== History ==
Stanford Raagapella was founded in 2002 by Mehul Trivedi, Bobby Ghosh, Sudeep Roy, and Jay Pandit. The group quickly grew from its founding four members to a steady size of fourteen to twenty. In 2005 and 2006 Stanford Raagapella won 1st Place at Anahat, a South Asian a cappella competition hosted yearly by UC Berkeley Indus. It placed 3rd in the competition in 2004 and 2007. In 2006, Stanford Raagapella also took part in the International Championship of Collegiate A Cappella (ICCA) where it was a semi-finalist. In 2007, Stanford Raagapella won 2nd place at the ICCA West Region Quarterfinal. In 2025, Stanford Raagapella competed in the Association of South-Asian A Cappella(ASA) circuit, where it placed 3rd at both USC Mehfil and Steel City Sapna. The group placed in the top 10 ELO rankings for the 2025 circuit.

Later that year, Stanford Raagapella went on its first tour, starting a yearly tradition of touring in locations such as the East and West coasts of the United States, Texas, Chicago, Iowa and India, during which CNN-IBN did a story about the group. The group had its first tour in India in 2008, stopping in Mumbai, Bangalore, and Hyderabad, where one of the shows was organized by Tanvi Shah. Stanford Raagapella first performed with composer and singer A.R. Rahman in 2006 in the Hollywood Bowl, reconvening in 2007 (in the Oracle Arena, Oakland and NASA Colosseum), and again in the Hollywood Bowl in 2011. Stanford Raagapella makes regular appearances in events on Stanford campus as well. The group still tours the US, performing at various colleges and has performed in a variety of locations including Barcelona for the wedding of Shristi Mittal, niece of Lakshmi Mittal.

== Music ==
Stanford Raagapella's music consists mainly of Bollywood and western pop. The repertoire also contains doo-wop (such as "I'll Take You Home"), Persian poetry ("Ey Karevan/Hallelujah"), a national song ("Vande Mataram"), hip hop ("Motel"), R&B ("Burn/Jaane Kye Chahe"), folk rock ("All Along the Watchtower") and bhangra ("Kangna"). While most songs are in Hindi and/or English, Stanford Raagapella has also sung in Punjabi, Sinhalese, Tamil, Persian, Telugu, Kannada, Sanskrit, Arabic, and French. Stanford Raagapella places emphasis on its quality of blend and its volume and richness of sound.

Stanford Raagapella's first album, Raag's to Riches was well received by The Recorded A Cappella Review Board, receiving a 4.3 out of 5 based on the reviews of RARB critics. The album also received an honorable mention for the year of 2006 by the RARB.

In 2016, Stanford Raagapella released its second album, Raag Time.

== Recordings ==
=== Raags to Riches (2005) ===
1. Yun Hi Chala (from Swades, composed by A. R. Rahman, sung by Udit Narayan, Hariharan, and Kailash Kher) / Stay (Dave Matthews Band)
2. Meri Jaan (Jay Sean)
3. Ruk Ja O Dil Deewane (from Dilwale Dulhania Le Jayenge, sung by Udit Narayan)
4. Dance With You (Nachna Tere Naal) (Jay Sean)
5. Tu Aashiqui Hai (From Jhankaar Beats, sung by KK)
6. Oh! Carol! (Jahveena!) (Stereo Nation)
7. Jaadu Teri Nazar (from Darr, sung by Udit Narayan)
8. Motel (Hotel) (Cassidy)
9. Woh Pehli Baar (from Pyaar Mein Kabhi Kabhi, sung by Shaan, Vishal Dadlani, Samrat, and Shiraz) / Dil Kya Kare (from Julie, sung by Kishore Kumar)
10. Sukiyaki (Kyu Sakamoto, 4 P.M. (group))
11. Chak De Saare Gham (from Hum Tum, sung by Sonu Nigam and Sadhana Sargam) / This Love (Maroon 5)
12. Maa Tujhe Salaam (Vande Mataram) (A. R. Rahman)

=== Raag Time (2016) ===
1. Oru Maalai / Oka Maru Kalisina Andam (From Ghajini, Karthik)
2. Ajab Si (from Om Shanti Om, KK)
3. Mahabharat (Title Song) (from Mahabharat (1988 TV series))
4. Jaane Kya Chahe Mann Bawra (Pyaar Ke Side Effects, Zubeen Garg) / Burn (Usher)
5. Yaara / Without You (Vivek Agrawal)
6. Aashayein (from Iqbal (film), KK)
7. O Humdum Suniyo Re (from Saathiya (film), A. R. Rahman)
8. Allah Ke Bande (from Waisa Bhi Hota Hai Part II, Kailash Kher)
9. Woh Lamhe (from Zeher, Atif Aslam / Jal (band))
10. Kangna Tera Ni (from Chaar Din Ki Chandni, Master Rakesh)

=== Raagstars (2019) ===
1. Ab Laut Aa
2. Chaiyya Chaiyya
3. Aicha
4. Silsila Ye Chahat Ka / Ae Dil Hai Mushkil
5. Kannodu Kanbathellam
6. Hallelujah / Ey Karevan
7. Chandrachooda

== Awards and nominations ==
The International Championship of Collegiate A Cappella (ICCA) first judged live a cappella performance competitions in 1996.

ICCA results for Raagapella
Year	Level	Result	Points	Citation
2007	West Region Quarterfinal #3	2nd	392	

== See also ==
- List of Stanford University a cappella groups
