= Fleet Street (album) =

Fleet Street (Cheese)

Studio album by the Stanford Fleet Street Singers
- Released: December 3, 2004
- Recorded: 2002–2004
- Studio: Bill Hare Productions in Milpitas, California
- Genre: A cappella; comedy music; satire; surreal humor
- Length: 54:02
- Producer: Mike Solomon; Michael Bernstein; Edward Requenez; Bill Hare

The Stanford Fleet Street Singers chronology
Fearless (2001)	Fleet Street (Cheese) (2004)	Through the Roof (2011)

Fleet Street (also known as Cheese for its distinctive album artwork), released in 2004, is the eleventh studio album by the collegiate comedy a cappella group the Stanford Fleet Street Singers. It was the first entirely original album in collegiate a cappella, for which it received critical recognition.

== Background ==
A cappella, and especially collegiate a cappella, has its roots in covers of popular music. As a cappella proliferated on college campuses across the United States in the 1990s, the genre found favor with audiences by reinterpreting familiar songs. In 2016, music professor Joshua Duchan observed that audiences are drawn to a cappella because "the repertory includes a lot of covers, and it's often interesting to hear how popular songs... are reconfigured for the a cappella medium."

The reliance on covers had its critics. In 2004, Broadway producer and a cappella critic Elie Landau wrote about Deke Sharon's (Note: Founder and longtime president of the Contemporary A Cappella Society.) long-standing concern with cover songs:

"For nigh on forever, Deke has been urging collegiate (and professional) groups to consider a shift to performing some, if not entirely, original material lest modern "pop" a cappella go the way of the cover band—a novelty to listen to once in a while, but not anything anyone wants to buy or consider seriously and artistically."

In the early 2000s, Sharon described a shift toward original music as "the biggest possible step for collegiate a cappella." In 2006, the Contemporary A Cappella Society added a new category for best original song to its recorded a cappella awards.

== Critical reception ==
The album is unusual as a collegiate a cappella album made up entirely of original songs.

Critics praised the lyrics and the broad scope of its fifteen songs. Contemporary A Cappella Society president Deke Sharon called it "the most important collegiate a cappella album to be released in a decade." Noting that Sharon had urged collegiate groups to pursue original material, Broadway producer and a cappella critic Elie Landau said, "the Fleet Street Singers of Stanford have answered Deke's call with probably the most gutsy and original collegiate album I've listened to in almost 20 years of active collegiate a cappella listening." Landau also praised lyrics written by Mike Solomon, saying they seemed "equally informed by the cadences and meter of Eminem as they do by the alliteration and internal rhyming of Sondheim." Critic Joshua Diamant called the album, "some of the most clever and sophisticated writing you'll hear all year."

Former Contemporary A Cappella Society president Jonathan Minkoff described the album as, "Some rock, some jazz, some really funny comedy." Minkoff highlighted the album's storytelling, commenting, "The stories are so much more interesting than the typical baby-I-miss-you-cause-you're-gone crap clogging the airwaves." Writing for The Recorded A Cappella Review Board, theater producer Elie Landau characterized the album's style as "Always wacky and zany... somewhere between the eccentric intellectualism of The Bobs and the somewhat more boisterous, more simplistic Da Vinci's Notebook."

Critics took issue with the mixing and the blend of the album. Landau wrote that he "[wished] the group and/or Bill had featured a bit more sensitivity to dynamics." Diamant wrote, "some seriously bad blend mars many of the tracks on Fleet Street, as though the group had spent too much rehearsal time writing songs and not enough singing."

=== Accolades ===
Year	Award	Category	Nominee(s)	Result	Ref.
2005	Contemporary A Cappella Recording Awards	Best Humor Song (Professional)	"Teen Angst" (Note: Original song.) on Fleet Street (2004)	Nominated	

== Impact on the group ==
The release of Fleet Street marked a turning point in the group's identity. After the album's release, members spoke more often of the group's original music than of their humor, which had previously dominated the group's identity. At the group's 25th reunion in 2007, former music director Youngmoo Kim pointed to a change: "There are more originals now." In 2011, then-music director Joel Chapman said during an interview, "One of the most important things we focus on is originality."

In a 2018 interview, singer Connor Meany characterized the group: "We've definitely evolved over time, but I think we still have the same core values—writing our own music and being funny."

That shift in identity was reflected in Fleet Street's recorded music, as well. After the release of Fleet Street, Fleet Street went on to produce original music at a significantly higher rate than they had done previously. While the group's previous release (2001's Fearless) contained just 2 original songs, the group's next album, Through The Roof (2011) featured 10 original tracks and the following album featured another 11 original tracks.

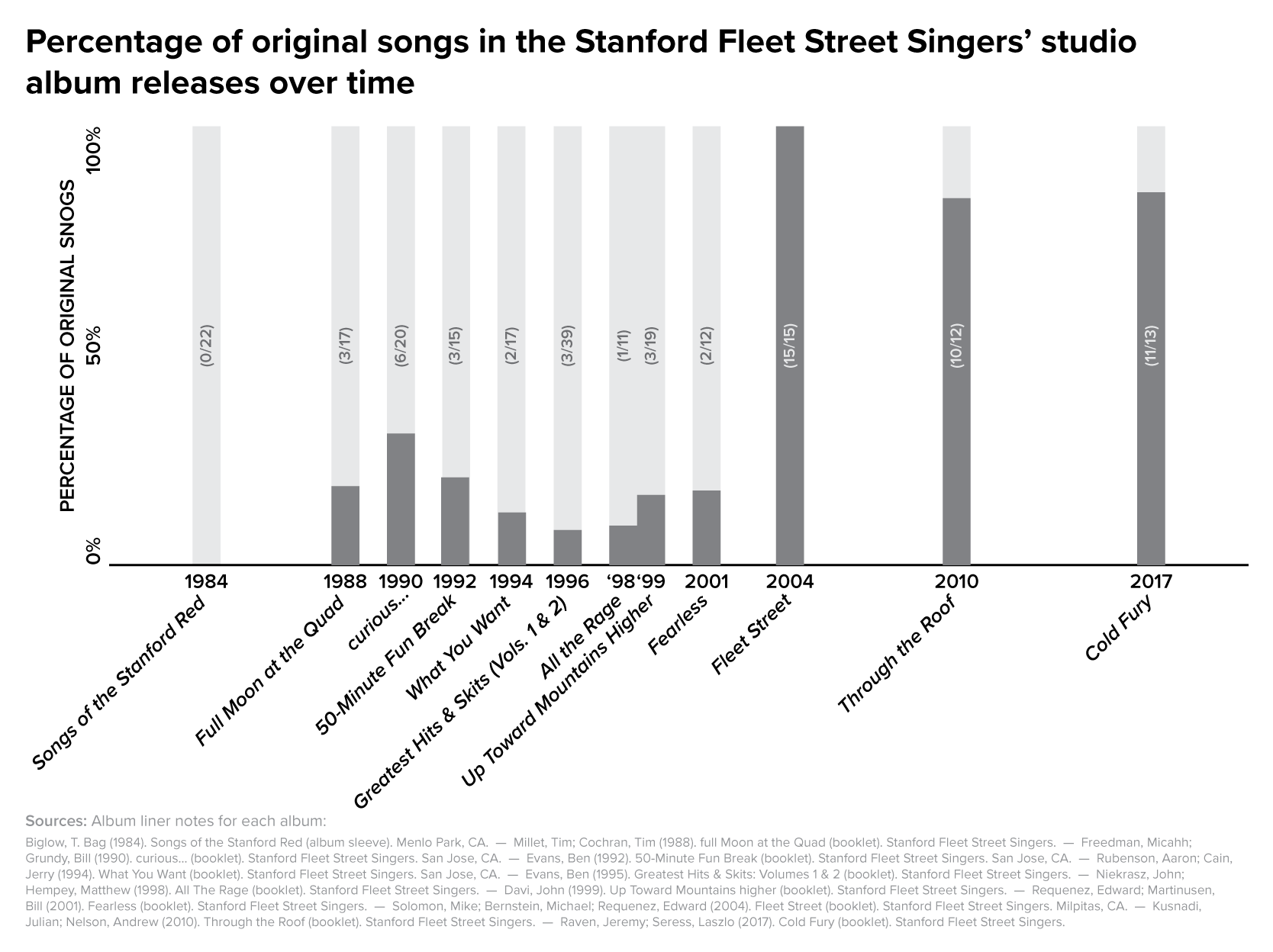
The percentage of original songs in each of Fleet Street's albums over time.

== Influence ==
Although Fleet Street was hailed by critics as an "exciting new direction for collegiate a cappella", as of 2019, Fleet Street's impact on original music production by other collegiate a cappella groups has not been documented.

In 2007, three years after the album's release, music scholar Joshua Duchan wrote that, "at its core, a cappella is about originality achieved through some form of emulation." Later in the same paper, he wrote, "in recent years, original compositions have become more common," but the lone example Duchan gave was the Stanford Fleet Street Singers' Fleet Street. In 2016, he re-affirmed that audiences should enjoy collegiate a cappella for its frequent use of cover songs.

== Track listing ==
Credits adapted from liner notes. All writers and arrangers are Fleet Street members and alumni.

No.	Title	Writer(s)	Arranger(s)	Length
1.	"The King of Plumbland"	Matt Breault	Mike Solomon	0:16
2.	"All Original"	Mike Solomon	Mike Solomon	3:56
3.	"Life-Sized Barbie"	Mike Solomon	Mike Solomon	2:33
4.	"Everyone Pees in the Shower"	Jason Mayland and Ben Evans	Jason Mayland and Martin Puryear	3:27
5.	"Love Song"	Mike Solomon	Mike Solomon	3:06
6.	"Lawyer"	Mike Solomon and James Pierson	Mike Solomon	3:53
7.	"Olympic Recession"	Mike Solomon	Mike Solomon	3:24
8.	"Losing Laura"	Mike Solomon	Mike Solomon	5:06
9.	"Clear Skies"	Doc Edge	Doc Edge	4:41
10.	"Teen Angst"	Michael Bernstein	Michael Bernstein	3:46
11.	"Pokey the Penguin"	Mike Solomon	Mike Solomon	4:18
12.	"Life"	Mike Solomon	Mike Solomon	2:19
13.	"Silver Jacket"	Ben Rosebrough, Michael Bernstein, and Michael Feldman	Ben Rosebrough, Michael Bernstein, and Michael Feldman	4:28
14.	"Gift of the Gods / Dawn of Battle"	Doc Edge, with Ben Rosebrough and Sanjay Kairam	Doc Edge, with Ben Rosebrough and Sanjay Kairam	2:20
15.	"Lords of A Cappella"	Rory Everett and Doc Edge	Rory Everett and Doc Edge	3:58
Total length:				54:02

== Personnel ==
Credits adapted from liner notes.

- Michael Bernstein – producer
- Michael Feldman – vocal percussion (tracks 2, 3, 4, 5, 7, 8, 10, 13, and 15)
- Bill Hare – recording, engineering, and mixing
- Bill Hart – additional vocal percussion (track 2)
- Edward Requenez – producer
- Ben Rosebrough – album artwork
- Mike Solomon – producer, recording, engineering, and mixing

== See also ==
- 50-Minute Fun Break (1992)
