= Stanford Harmonics =

American university a cappella group

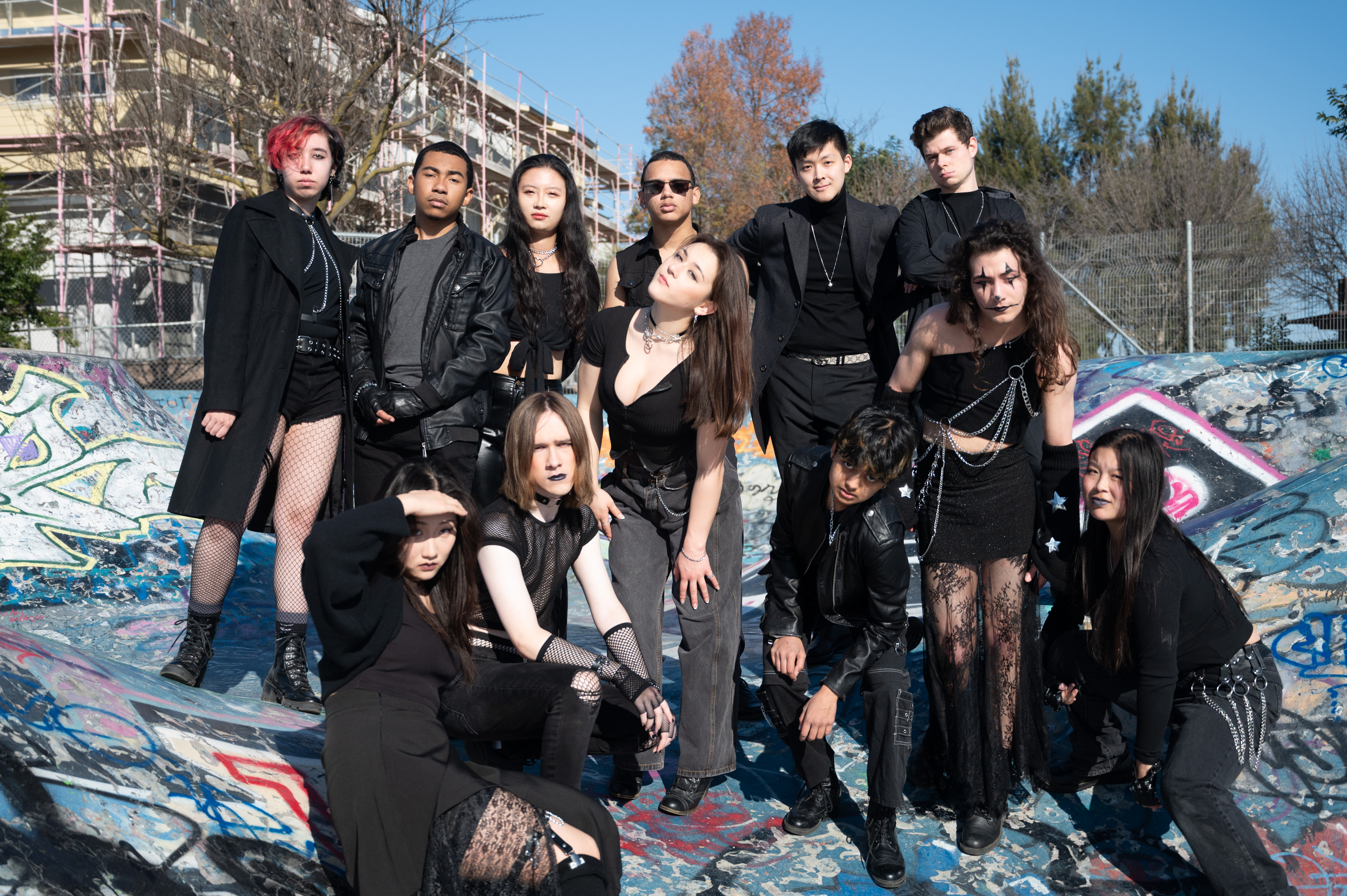
- Stanford Harmonics, January 2025

Background information
- Origin: Stanford, California, USA
- Genres: A cappella
- Years active: 1991–present
- Website: www.stanfordharmonics.com

The Stanford Harmonics, also known as The Harmonics, are a co-ed a cappella group from Stanford University. Known for their alternative rock repertoire and award-winning recordings, the Harmonics have garnered international recognition for their performances and have been featured on BOCA, Sing, and Voices Only a cappella compilations. The Harmonics are one of the few collegiate a cappella groups that own their own wireless microphone equipment and have developed a live performance style that includes the use of electronic distortion and sound effects.

== History ==
The group's third release, Insanity Laughs (1999), was received as a "breakthrough album" for the unprecedented mixing of its drum-like vocal percussion.

In 2009, their landmark studio album Escape Velocity won three Contemporary A Cappella Recording Awards, including Best Mixed Collegiate Album, and was selected by the Recorded A Cappella Review Board as one of their Picks of the Decade.

In 2010, the Harmonics won the A Cappella Community Awards for Favorite Mixed Collegiate Group and Favorite Scholastic Album.

In 2020, their album Signal Lost won Best Rock Album from the Contemporary A Cappella Recording Awards.

Their newest album Event Horizon, a concept album centered around grief, was released in August 2025.

== Recordings ==
The Stanford Harmonics have released eleven full-length albums, one "greatest hits" album, and one extended play, alongside numerous singles.

- The Greatest Hits of Pitchpipe (1995)
- Escalator Music (1997)
- Insanity Laughs (1999)
- Phonoshop (2001)
- evolut10n (2002) - 10 Year Anniversary "Greatest Hits" Album
- Rock Beats Scissors (2003)
- Shadowplay (2005)
- Escape Velocity (2008)
- Midnight Hour (2013)
- The Messes of Men (2015) - EP
- Fault of Imagination (2017)
- Signal Lost (2019)
- Event Horizon (2025)
- Ashes to Ashes (2026) - not yet released

== Awards and nominations ==
Year	Award	Category	Nominee(s)	Result	Ref.
1998	Contemporary A Cappella Recording Awards	Best Mixed Collegiate Album	Escalator Music	Nominated	
2000	Contemporary A Cappella Recording Awards	Best Mixed Collegiate Album	Insanity Laughs	Nominated	
2000	Contemporary A Cappella Recording Awards	Best Mixed Collegiate Arrangement	Jonathan Pilat	Nominated	
2002	Contemporary A Cappella Recording Awards	Best Mixed Collegiate Album	Phonoshop	Nominated	
2002	Contemporary A Cappella Recording Awards	Best Mixed Collegiate Arrangement	Jonathan Pilat for "We Are In Love"	Runner-up	
2004	Contemporary A Cappella Recording Awards	Best Mixed Collegiate Song	"Lady Marmalade" from Rock Beats Scissors	Runner-up	
2006	Contemporary A Cappella Recording Awards	Best Mixed Collegiate Album	Shadowplay	Nominated	
2006	Contemporary A Cappella Recording Awards	Best Mixed Collegiate Solo	Bryan Tan for "The Memory Remains"	Nominated	
2009	Contemporary A Cappella Recording Awards	Best Mixed Collegiate Album	Escape Velocity	Won	
2009	Contemporary A Cappella Recording Awards	Best Mixed Collegiate Song	"The Sound of Silence"	Won	
2009	Contemporary A Cappella Recording Awards	Best Mixed Collegiate Arrangement (Note: Charlie Forkish was named both the winner and the runner-up (against himself) for these two arrangements on Escape Velocity.)	Charlie Forkish for "The Sound of Silence"	Won	
2009	Contemporary A Cappella Recording Awards	Best Mixed Collegiate Arrangement	Charlie Forkish for "Imagination"	Runner-up	
2010	Contemporary A Cappella Recording Awards	Best Mixed Collegiate Song	"Spiel Met Mir" from Sing Six: Sunny Side Up	Nominated	
2014	Contemporary A Cappella Recording Awards	Best Mixed Collegiate Album	Midnight Hour	Nominated	
2014	Contemporary A Cappella Recording Awards	Best Mixed Collegiate Song	"Somebody to Love"	Nominated	
2014	Contemporary A Cappella Recording Awards	Best Mixed Collegiate Arrangement	Evan Smith for "Somebody to Love"	Nominated	
2018	Contemporary A Cappella Recording Awards	Best Electronic / Experimental Album	Fault of Imagination	Nominated	
2020	Contemporary A Cappella Recording Awards	Best Rock Album	Signal Lost	Won	
2020	Contemporary A Cappella Recording Awards	Best Rock Song	"Zombie" from Signal Lost	Nominated	
2020	Contemporary A Cappella Recording Awards	Best Mixed Collegiate Album	Signal Lost	Nominated	
2022	Contemporary A Cappella Recording Awards	Best Mixed Voices Collegiate Solo	Mitchell Zimmerman for "Ever After" (Single)	Nominated	
2026	Contemporary A Cappella Recording Awards	Best Mixed Voices Collegiate Album	Event Horizon	Runner-up	
2026	Contemporary A Cappella Recording Awards	Best Rock Album	Event Horizon	Runner-up	
2026	Contemporary A Cappella Recording Awards	Best Mixed Voices Collegiate Song	"When Demons Come to Life"	Nominated	
2026	Contemporary A Cappella Recording Awards	Best Mixed Voices Collegiate Arrangement	Nemi Nayak for "Saeed"	Nominated	
2026	Contemporary A Cappella Recording Awards	Best Mixed Voices Collegiate Solo	Sawyer Niehaus and Madeleine Salem for "When Demons Come to Life"	Nominated	
2026	Contemporary A Cappella Recording Awards	Best Rock Song	"Unself Portrait"	Nominated	
2026	Contemporary A Cappella Recording Awards	Best Electronic Song	"Saeed"	Nominated	

=== ICCA results ===
The International Championship of Collegiate A Cappella (ICCA) first judged live a cappella performance competitions in 1996.

Year	Level	Category	Recipient(s)	Result	Points	Citation
1996	West Region Semifinal	Best Solo	Zareen Poonen for "Change in My Life'	Runner-up	N/A	
2000	West Region Quarterfinal #1	Best Group	Harmonics	2nd	—	
2002	West Region Quarterfinal #2	Best Soloist	Morgan Reed	Runner-up (tie)	N/A	
2002	West Region Quarterfinal #2	Best Arrangement	Jon Pilat for "Lady Marmalade"	Runner-up (tie)	N/A	
2003	West Region Quarterfinal #3	Best Group	Harmonics	3rd	—	
2003	West Region Quarterfinal #3	Best Arrangement	Marcella White Campbell for "Porcelain"	Won	N/A	
2004	West Region Quarterfinal #1	Outstanding Vocal Percussion	Ben D'Angelo and Daniel Holbert	won	N/A	
2021	West Region Quarterfinal #3	Best Group	Harmonics	3rd	312	

== Notable members ==
- Singer/songwriter Vienna Teng
- Contemporary A Cappella Society of America (CASA) President Julia Hoffman and Board Member Ariel Glassman
- Hookslide singers Jon Pilat and George Hoffman
- Former Skritch lead Bryan Tan
- Icon Parthiv Krishna
- Gautam Raghavan, Deputy Director of the White House Presidential Personnel Office
- Composer Joss Paxton Saltzman
- Jade Nguyen

== See also ==
- List of Stanford University a cappella groups
