= List of Stanford University a cappella groups =

Collegiate a cappella arrived at Stanford University in 1963, when the Stanford Mendicants were founded by a transfer student from Yale University, the school where collegiate a cappella began. The Mendicants were the first a cappella group on the West Coast of the United States. The all-male Mendicants were followed by Stanford's second a cappella group, Counterpoint, the first all-female a cappella group on the West Coast.

By the 1980s, as collegiate a cappella hit an inflection point and the number of groups doubled around the United States, Stanford saw the founding of four more a cappella groups, each with its own initial differentiating focus: Fleet Street (founded 1981, focused on comedy), Mixed Company (founded 1985, Stanford's first co-ed a cappella group), and Everyday People (founded 1987, focused on Motown, R&B, and the burgeoning genre of hip hop music), and Stanford Talisman (founded in 1989, focused on music from the African diaspora).

By the 1990s, Stanford a cappella groups began receiving national recognition for their recorded music, created with audio engineer Bill Hare. In 1995, Fleet Street won the 1995 national Contemporary A Cappella Recording Awards for best album, best song, and best soloist. President of the Society, Deke Sharon, praised the group's work, saying, "The quality [of their music] is fantastic. They're very good performers and their recordings are remarkably professional for a student-run group." In 1999, Stanford groups received a record 14 nominations at the Contemporary A Cappella Recording Awards. Sharon, said, "it's rare for so many excellent groups to come out of one school."

== List of a cappella groups ==
As of 2025, there are ten a cappella groups at Stanford. Here, in order of founding date:

- Mendicants (f. 1963): Stanford's oldest a cappella group.
- Counterpoint (f. 1979): first all-female collegiate a cappella group on the West Coast.
- Fleet Street (f. 1981): co-ed comedy group known for original songs.
- Mixed Company ("Mixed Co"; f. 1985): pop focus, Stanford's first co-ed a cappella group.
- Everyday People ("EP"; f. 1987): Hip Hop, R&B, Motown and Soul focus.
- Talisman (f. 1989): South Africa and the African diaspora focus, now broadly international.
- Harmonics (f. 1991): alternative rock focus.
- Testimony (f. 1991): Christian music focus.
- Raagapella (f. 2002): South Asian focus.
- O-Tone (f. 2016): East Asian focus.

== Bibliography ==
- Brockenbrough, Andy (26 September 1991). "A time to sing and sing and..." published in The Stanford Daily, p. 8. Print.
- Chopra, Nitin (24 September 1998). "A cappella nation: A Stanford tradition," published in The Stanford Daily: Intermission, pp. 5–7. Print.
- Omer, Issra (11 August 2011). "Beyond the barbershop: Stanford’s diverse a capella scene" published online by The Stanford Daily. Online.
