= Sweeney Todd (disambiguation) =

Sweeney Todd is a fictional homicidal barber.

Sweeney Todd may also refer to:

- Sweeney Todd (1928 film), 1928 British silent crime film
- Sweeney Todd: The Demon Barber of Fleet Street (1936 film), directed by George King
- Sweeney Todd (ballet), 1959 ballet for orchestra by Malcolm Arnold and John Cranko
- Sweeney Todd: The Demon Barber of Fleet Street, 1970 play by Christopher Bond, on which the Sondheim/Wheeler musical was based
- Sweeney Todd: The Demon Barber of Fleet Street, Tony award-winning 1979 musical by Stephen Sondheim and Hugh Wheeler
  - Sweeney Todd: The Demon Barber of Fleet Street (original Broadway cast recording), a 1979 album containing a recording of the musical
- The Tale of Sweeney Todd, 1997 Showtime television movie
- Sweeney Todd, 2006 television film
- Sweeney Todd: The Demon Barber of Fleet Street (2007 film), Tim Burton's adaptation of the Sondheim/Wheeler musical
  - Sweeney Todd: The Demon Barber of Fleet Street: The Motion Picture Soundtrack, a 2007 album containing the soundtrack to the above film
- Sweeney Todd (band), Canadian glam-rock band
  - Sweeney Todd (Sweeney Todd album), the band's first album
- Sweeney Todd, rhyming slang for the Flying Squad, a division of the London Metropolitan Police, usually abbreviated as The Sweeney
- The Sweeney, British television police drama about the Flying Squad of the London Metropolitan Police

== See also ==
- Madeline Amy Sweeney (1965–2001), American flight attendant and victim of the September 11 attacks, whose maiden name was Todd
