= Stanford Mendicants =

The Stanford Mendicants
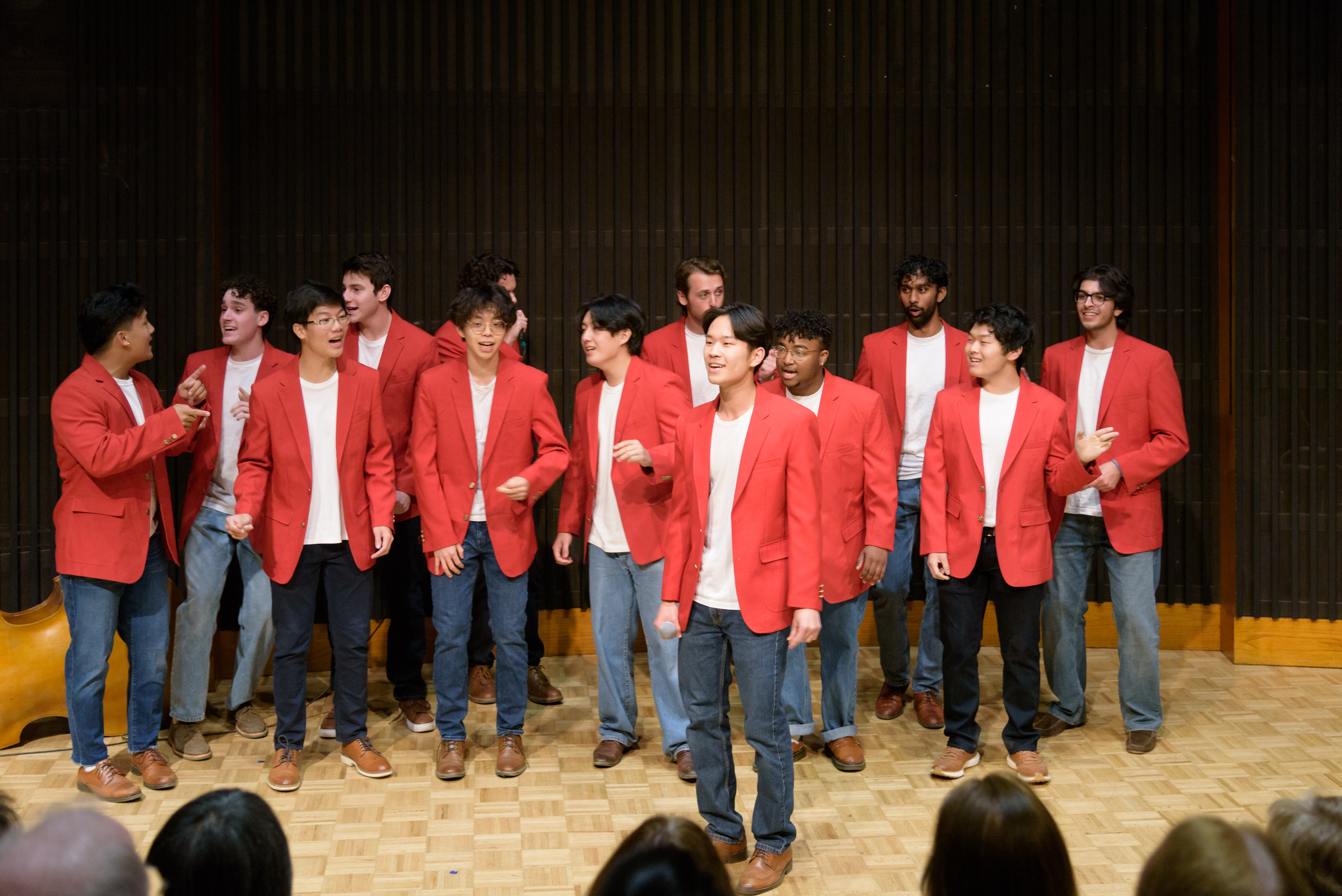
- Stanford Mendicants performing in 2024

Background information
- Origin: Stanford, California, USA
- Genre: A Cappella
- Years active: 1963—present
- Website: www.StanfordMendicants.com

The Stanford Mendicants are an all-male a cappella group at Stanford University. The group is Stanford University's first a cappella group. Since its founding in 1963, the group's size has varied from 6 to 19 members. Although they are strictly an a cappella group today, they have performed with instruments in previous generations. The group prides itself on singing a wide range of songs, from gospel to barbershop to pop tunes and original compositions. The Mendicants are known around Stanford's campus for their red blazers and romantic serenades.

== History and Accolades ==
The Stanford Mendicants was founded in 1963 by Hank Adams, a transfer student from Yale University, with a group of five undergraduate men. The group originally rehearsed only a single song before breaking into the dining commons of Branner Hall, an all-women's dormitory at the time, and performing their song during lunch. Adams often recalled, himself tearing up, that during their performance, the women wept, and there was literally "not a dry eye in the house". Having only rehearsed the one song, they quickly fled through an open window and went immediately back to rehearsal.

Their 1998 album Besides What You See received a 4.2 rating from the Recorded A Cappella Review Board (rarb.org), which is the group's highest album score to date.

The group was Runner-Up in three categories in the inaugural Contemporary A Cappella Recording Awards (CARAs) in 1992. As of 2020, they have been nominated for six more recording awards since then: in 1999, 2001, 2005, and 2019.

Mendicant songs were selected for Varsity Vocals' "Best of Collegiate A Cappella" compilation album in both 2001 and 2005.

On February 2, 2019, The Stanford Mendicants finished in first place in the ICCA Northern California Quarter-Finals in Redwood City, CA. The Mendicants also took home two individual awards, including Outstanding Soloist, for Austin Zambito-Valente, and Outstanding Choreography, for Khoi Le and Gabe Wieder.

== Notable alumni ==
- Chris Ayer, Singer and Songwriter
- Jordan Gelber, actor from the Broadway run of Avenue Q
- Founding Mendicant Dick Grant, Director of the Pacific Mozart Ensemble
- Founding Mendicant John Frohnmayer, Politician and Professor at Oregon State University
- Joseph Siravo, actor with The Sopranos and Jersey Boys National Tour.

== Discography ==
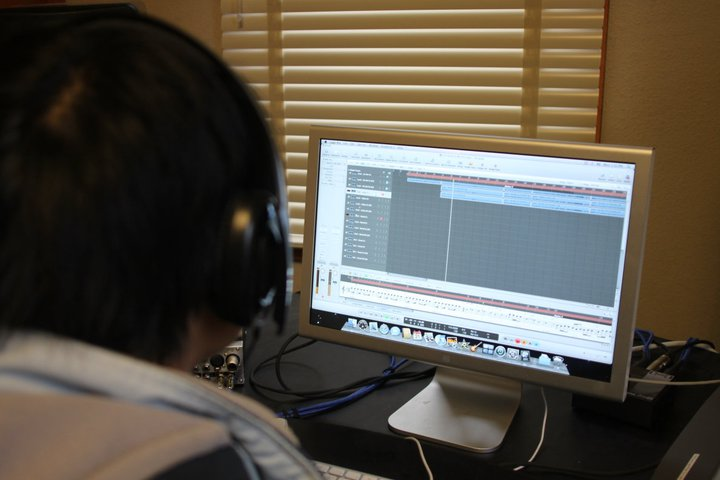
2011 Musical Director De Wei Koh editing a track for Sh-Boom

- Untitled (1964)
- Untitled (1965)
- A Fellow Needs a Girl (1966)
- Untitled (1967)
- Untitled (1969)
- Untitled (1973)
- Untitled (1975)
- Untitled (1977)
- Untitled (1979)
- Clean-Cut and Slightly Frayed (1981)
- Somewhere in Hawaii (1982)
- Take You Back (1986)
- Pretending to Care (1987)
- Aquapella (1989)
- Just Like That (1991)
- Feline Casanova (1992)
- Back For Seconds (1994)
- Beggars Can't Be Choosers (1996)
- Besides What You See (1998)
- Room to Grow (2000)
- Best Laid Plans (2002)
- Mendication (2004)
- Beggar's Dozen (2006)
- Roses In My Hand (2008)
- Sh-Boom (2012)
- Just a Group of Guys (2013)
- Mendicants At Large (2015)
- For the Long Haul (2018)
- Trailblazer (2019)
- Detour (2021)
- Horizon (2023)
- Unlucky (2025)

== Awards and nominations ==
Year	Award	Category	Nominee(s)	Result	Ref.
1992	Contemporary A Cappella Recording Awards (Note: Prior to 1992, there were no awards organizations related to a cappella. The Contemporary A Cappella Society announced Recording Awards for the first time in 1992. The ICCAs introduced live a cappella performance competitions in 1996.)	Best Male Collegiate Album	Just Like That	Runner-up (tie)	
1992	Contemporary A Cappella Recording Awards	Best Male Collegiate Song	"Long Train Runnin'"	Runner-up (tie)	
1992	Contemporary A Cappella Recording Awards	Best Male Collegiate Arrangement	"Brown Eyed Girl"	Runner-up	
1999	Contemporary A Cappella Recording Awards	Best Male Collegiate Album	Besides What You See	Runner-up	
1999	Contemporary A Cappella Recording Awards	Best Male Collegiate Song	"Drive"	Nominated	
1999	Contemporary A Cappella Recording Awards	Best Male Collegiate Soloist	Brandon Singleton	Nominated	
2001	Contemporary A Cappella Recording Awards	Best Male Collegiate Song	"Happy Together"	Nominated	
2005	Contemporary A Cappella Recording Awards	Best Male Collegiate Song	"Wake Me Up Before You Go Go" from Mendication	Nominated	
2019	Contemporary A Cappella Recording Awards	Best Male Collegiate Song	"Control" from For the Long Haul	Nominated	
2019	A Cappella Video Awards	Best Male Collegiate Video	"Kiss the Sky"	Runner-up	

=== ICCA results ===
The International Championship of Collegiate A Cappella (ICCA) first judged live a cappella performance competitions in 1996.

Year	Level	Category	Recipient(s)	Result	Points	Citation
1998	West Region Quarterfinal #2	Best Solo	Brandon Singleton for "Reach Out"	Runner‑up	—	
2002	West Region Quarterfinal #3	Best Soloist	Eric Tanner	Won	—	
2017	Northwest Quarterfinal #4	Best Group	Mendicants	2nd	399	
2017	Northwest Semifinal	Best Group	Mendicants	3rd	361	
2018	West Quarterfinal #4	Best Group	Mendicants	3rd	334	
2019	West Quarterfinal #3	Best Group	Mendicants	1st	389	
2019	West Quarterfinal #3	Outstanding Soloist	Austin Zambito-Valente for "Don't Let Me Be Misunderstood/How Long"	Won	—	
2019	West Quarterfinal #3	Outstanding Choreography	Gabe Wieder and Khoi Le for the entire set	Won	—	
2020	West Quarterfinal #5	Best Group	Mendicants	2nd	343	
2020	West Quarterfinal #5	Outstanding Soloist	Austin Zambito-Valente for "Dig Down"	Won	—	
2020	West Quarterfinal #5	Outstanding Arrangement	Chris Kaya for the entire set	Won	—	

== See also ==
- List of Stanford University a cappella groups
