= Stanford Robotics Club =

Student robotics organization at Stanford University

- Formation: 2012
- Type: Student organization
- Location: Stanford University, Stanford, California, United States
- Affiliations: Stanford University

Stanford Robotics Club is a student robotics organization at Stanford University. The club was founded in 2012 by Eric Smalls. It received media coverage in 2013 for hosting a drone hackathon at Stanford during National Robotics Week, and in 2019 for the development of Stanford Doggo, an open-source quadrupedal robot created by the club's Extreme Mobility team.

== History ==
According to The Stanford Daily, Smalls founded the club after arriving at Stanford and finding that the university did not have a student robotics club. Students petitioned to establish the organization as a voluntary student organization in October 2012, and the application was accepted in December 2012. The same report stated that, within three months of its founding, the club had grown to 65 active members.

In April 2013, the club hosted a two-day AR Drone hackathon at Stanford University. IEEE Spectrum described the event as one of the earliest U.S. National Robotics Week events.

== Projects ==
In 2019, members of the club's Extreme Mobility team developed Stanford Doggo, a quadrupedal robot designed to be reproducible and built largely from off-the-shelf parts. The project was covered by technology publications including TechCrunch, The Verge, and Gizmodo.

In 2020, TechCrunch featured Doggo and related robots from the same team in coverage of TC Sessions: Robotics + AI.
