= John Kaplan (law professor) =

American legal scholar and law professor (1929–1989)

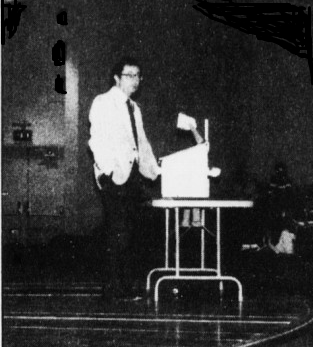
- John Kaplan lecturing at Stanford University
- Born: 1929
- Died: November 25, 1989 (aged 59–60)
- Occupation: Law Professor

John Kaplan (1929 – November 25, 1989) was an American legal scholar, social scientist, social justice advocate, popular law professor, and author. He was a leading authority in the field of criminal law, and was widely known for his legal analyses of some of the deepest social problems in the United States. He was known for his work linking sociological research with legal policies, and limiting academic legal theory with real-world sociological data. He was an advocate for ending criminal prohibitions on private behavior such as drug use, arguing that these laws only made any problems worse.

== Education and career ==
Kaplan received a bachelor of science degree in physics from Harvard University, then worked in a Naval research lab for several years. He returned to Harvard to attend Law School, was a member of the Harvard Law Review, and graduated magna cum laude. In 1954–55, after his law degree, he served as law clerk for US Supreme Court Justice Thomas C. Clark, then studied criminology in Vienna, Austria.

He practiced as a criminal defense attorney then worked in the Department of Justice in Illinois as a Special U.S. Attorney, trying tax fraud cases, commenting "it was my method of squaring things with poor people." He then moved to work as an Assistant United States Attorney in the Northern District of California, later commenting on this work, "I tried to discourage guilty pleas then, because I loved to try cases." In 1962, he began teaching law at Northwestern University, then at University of California Berkeley. In 1965, he joined the law faculty at Stanford University, where he became the Jackson Eli Reynolds Professor of Law.

He wrote notable text books on the legal theory of evidence and on criminal law, as well as publishing both scholarly works and books on social justice.

== Publications ==
=== Scholarly work ===
Kaplan's Decision Theory and the Factfinding Process (1968) applies decision theory to the judicial factfinding process, not with the end of providing a rigorous mathematical process to make decisions of fact, which he considered unrealistic, but to provide insights into the overall decision process in legal system. United States Supreme Court Justice William J. Brennan Jr. recommended this article in a footnote of In re Winship, as an "interesting analysis" of the factfinding process.

In Of Babies and Bathwater (1977), Kaplan asserted that jurors mistrust the accuracy of press reports, and assumed their own knowledge of the facts of the case was superior to that of any newspaper reporter.

The Problem of Capital Punishment (1983) was cited by United States Supreme Court Justice Byron White in Pulley v. Harris, as neatly summarizing the problem in which defendants who are charged and convicted for similar crimes often receive vastly different sentences.

=== Books ===
His 1972 textbook, Criminal Justice was adopted at more than 100 colleges nationally. In The Hardest Drug: Heroin and Public Policy (1983), he wrote that drug policies "are about as good as we're going to get. .. Heroin maintenance won't work and free availability would be even worse", noting that "increased law enforcement may not prove very cost-effective. You could send two prisoners to Stanford for the cost of sending one to prison."

== Teaching ==
Kaplan's colleagues described him as a "spellbinding" and "legendary" teacher, who was "fast on his feet, funny and got right to the point". He was one of the most popular teachers at Stanford University, and taught one its most popular classes - The Criminal Law and the Criminal System, which filled the largest lecture hall on campus and used an innovative (for its time) method of handling overflow by broadcasting the class on the campus radio station. The student press wrote, "hundreds of students in his undergraduate and law school classes have loved him for are his humorous and informative lectures, his caring and open attitude, and his lively personality in and out of class." He received the John Bingham Hurlbut Award for teaching excellence.

== Social science and activism ==
Over his career, Kaplan served on several government committees, advising on drug laws, criminal law, and social issues. As one of the major social scientists of criminal law, he was known as demanding that legal theory confront the hard facts produced by criminological research. He was known as a "hard-nosed policy analyst" and "one of a few legal academics who also had an expertise in policy analysis without ideological preconceptions."

In 1985, Stanford University charged Kaplan with investigating allegations of police brutality, after a Stanford student was physically injured after being arrested by campus law enforcement officials, who used pain compliance holds on students using passive resistance to protest Stanford investment in companies doing business in apartheid South Africa. Kaplan's report was critical of the police hold method, and commended campus security for rapidly changing methods for handling limp protesters. Criticism of the investigation included that the report was prepared prior to meeting with student eyewitnesses, and that when Kaplan and the head of campus police met with student eye-witnesses, the students were not allowed to ask questions at the meeting or see a copy of the report prior to the meeting.

In 1989, he chaired the Faculty Senate at Stanford University.

== Personality ==
Kaplan was known to his colleagues, students, and community for his academic brilliance, teaching skills, activist concern for others, high energy level, and sense of humor. He often appeared in the media, where he was described as "pithy, humorous, and incisive" and as having a "quick wit and exhaustive knowledge of criminal law. Harvard law professor James Q. Wilson said Kaplan was "one of the ablest and brightest people I know in the field of criminal justice", and additionally was one of the best "conversationalists" he knew. Colleague and Stanford Law School Dean Paul Brest described him, as "a delight and an education, and sometimes a challenge to get words in edgewise." Kaplan lectured to full audiences at Stanford's largest lecture halls with hyperactive and gesticulating lecture style:

Kaplan appears to move constantly, walking casually back and forth across the stage or in the aisles ... rolling or pushing up the sleeves of his white shirt, and putting his hands in his pockets ... punctuating his lectures with emphatic gestures, pantomiming questions, answers and comments while speaking them, and immediately communicating his opinion of any issue.

=== Sense of humor ===
Kaplan was known for "a crackling wit and a boisterous sense of humor." A former student described Kaplan as "a brilliant, often outrageous teacher, who employed humor in an attempt to drive the law into our not always receptive minds." His colleague commented that Kaplan provided "the sense of irreverence that we desperately need around the law school." His sense of self-deprecating humor was described as being of the "New York type" in the Stanford law school newspaper, comparing Kaplan to comedic film director Woody Allen. The student press described him as being the worst dresser on campus, and having a desk littered with books, manuscripts, messages, tape recorders, and professorial odds and ends ... and with Kaplan's feet, which he hastily removed and started putting some papers in the wastebasket. Kaplan replied, "I'm usually a complete slob ... my filing system is to throw things out" and "Oh, well, no one has ever loved me for my looks". When asked to teach an antitrust class in which he had no expertise, prior to rapidly becoming an expert on the subject, he wrote in the course guide description, "This course will have something to do with antitrust law whatever that is." He once broadcast his Criminal Law mid-term like a baseball game over the campus radio station, with "a color commentator, pre-exam warm-up, and interviews with students and TA's after the event". He was fond of practical jokes. His colleagues posthumously added this footnote to their criminal Law casebook they coauthored with Kaplan:

The late Prof. John Kaplan was fond of the following classroom hypothetical [involving attempt, recklessness, and intent]: A very bad person goes to the roof of a high-rise building, dragging a very heavy potted plant. He pushes the plant over the edge and down onto a crowded noontime street, but, by miraculous chance, it does not hit any person. Of what is he guilty? (Extra credit was given to anyone answering 'littering'.)

== Personal life ==
Kaplan was born in New York City to Mr. Kaplan and Dorothy Kaplan. He married Elizabeth Kaplan and they fathered three children in Palo Alto, California, Carolyn Springer Kaplan, Jonathan Edward Kaplan, and Jessica Baron Kaplan.

He died of cancer after aggressively trying to fight it, undergoing experimental therapy to treat the brain tumor that eventually killed him. Doctors infected Kaplan with a bacterium, in conjunction with other chemicals, to stimulate his immune system in an effort to fight off the cancerous cells, based on experiments on mice showing an 80 percent elimination of brain tumors for a type of tumor that was a different from Kaplan's. Colleague Robert Weisberg commented that Kaplan's motives for undergoing experimental treatment derived from his "selfless interest in seeing whether this therapy might work" for others.

== Selected publications ==
=== before 1970 ===
- Suits Against Unincorporated Associations Under the Federal Rules of Civil Procedure (1954)
- Search and Seizure: A No-Man's Land in the Criminal Law (1961)
- Segregation Litigation and the Schools-Part I: The New Rochelle Experience (1963)
- Segregation Litigation and the Schools-Part II: The General Northern Problem (1963)
- Segregation Litigation and the Schools-Part III: The Gary Litigation (1964)
- Prosecutorial Discretion-A Comment (1965)
- The Trial of Jack Ruby (1965)
- Equal Justice in an Unequal World: Equality for the Negro-The Problem of Special Treatment (1966)
- "The Assassins." Reviews of Rush to Judgment by Mark Lane; Inquest by Edward Jay Epstein; Whitewash: The Report on the Warren Report by Harold Weisberg; The Oswald Affair by Léo Sauvage; The Second Oswald by Richard H. Popkin. Stanford Law Review, Vol. 19, No. 5, 1967, pp. 1110–1151. JSTOR 1227605.
- Decision Theory and the Factfinding Process (1968)

=== 1970–1979 ===
- Marijuana, the new prohibition (1970)
- The role of the law in drug control (1972)
- The Limits of the Exclusionary Rule (1974)
- American Merchandising and the Guilty Plea: Replacing the Bazaar with the Department Store (1977)
- Of Babies and Bathwater (1977)

=== 1980– ===
- The wisdom of gun prohibition (1981)
- The Problem of Capital Punishment (1983)
- The Hardest Drug: Heroin and Public Policy (1983)
- Administering Capital Punishment (1984)
- Firearms and violence: Issues of public policy (1984)
- Defending Guilty People (1986)
- Taking drugs seriously (1988)

== Textbooks ==
- Criminal Justice (1972)
- Criminal Law: Cases and Materials
- Evidence: Cases and Materials (1992)

== See also ==
- List of law clerks for the tenth seat of the Supreme Court of the United States
