= John Hart Ely =

American legal scholar (1938–2003)

- Born: December 3, 1938; New York City, U.S.
- Died: October 25, 2003 (aged 64); Coconut Grove, Florida, U.S.
- Education: Princeton University (BA); Yale University (LLB); London School of Economics
- Notable work: The Wages of Crying Wolf (1973); Democracy and Distrust (1980)
- Awards: American Academy of Arts and Sciences (1981); Triennial Award of the Order of the Coif (1982)

Academic work
- Discipline: Constitutional law
- Institutions: Yale University; Harvard University; Stanford University; University of Miami
- Notable ideas: Political process theory
- Influenced: Chertoff; Fleming; Mallat; Sullivan; Tribe

9th Dean of Stanford Law School
- In office 1982–1987
- President: Donald Kennedy
- Preceded by: Charles J. Meyers
- Succeeded by: Paul A. Brest

John Hart Ely (/ˈiːliː/ EE-lee; December 3, 1938 – October 25, 2003) was an American legal scholar. He was a professor of law at Yale Law School from 1968 to 1973, Harvard Law School from 1973 to 1982, Stanford Law School from 1982 to 1996, and at the University of Miami Law School from 1996 until his death. From 1982 until 1987, he was the 9th dean of Stanford Law School.

As a student at Yale Law School, Ely became a member of the legal team of Abe Fortas, contributing to the landmark ruling in Gideon v. Wainwright that required states to provide legal representation to those who could not afford their own. He continued his legal career as the youngest staff member of the Warren Commission tasked with investigating the assassination of John F. Kennedy. After clerking for Justice Earl Warren, he went on to study abroad and returned to take a position as a public defender before beginning a distinguished career in academia as a professor at Yale, Harvard, and Stanford.

During his scholarly career, Ely became known for his devotion to the separation of powers and championship of the political process theory. An outspoken critic of judicial activism, he penned an article in the pages of the Yale Law Journal criticizing the Supreme Court's decision in Roe v. Wade in spite of his own agreements with the ruling on policy grounds. His 1980 work Democracy and Distrust became the most-cited legal text written in the 20th century.

In 1996, Ely had three publications which were among the most-cited law review articles of all time. According to a 2000 study in the University of Chicago's Journal of Legal Studies, he was ranked fourth among the most widely cited legal scholars in American history after Richard Posner, Ronald Dworkin, and Oliver Wendell Holmes Jr.

== Early life and education ==
Ely was born in New York City on December 3, 1938. His father was John H. Ely Sr. and his mother was Elliott Payne. After graduating from Westhampton Beach High School in 1956, he enrolled at Princeton University, majoring in philosophy and earning a Bachelor of Arts, summa cum laude, with Phi Beta Kappa membership in 1960. He then attended Yale Law School, where he was the notes and comments editor of the Yale Law Journal, graduating in 1963 with an LL.B., magna cum laude, with membership in the Order of the Coif.

While still a third-year student at Yale, Ely became a summer clerk at Arnold, Fortas, & Porter—a Washington, D.C. law firm. There, he assisted Abe Fortas in the landmark case of Gideon v. Wainwright, writing a first draft of a brief on behalf of the plaintiff, Clarence Earl Gideon. Ely had been tasked with doing the basic research for the case, writing under pressure to produce a set of legal memoranda including a 25-page paper titled "Application, Ambiguities, and Weaknesses of the Special Counsel Rule" that examined the application of Betts v. Brady in state courts. (Note: In the final, published brief which encompassed Ely's research that had been signed by Abe Fortas, Abe Krash, and Ralph Temple; the group acknowledged Ely's "valuable assistance" in a footnote since Ely could not sign the document seeing as he had not yet passed the bar.)

After law school, Ely served as the youngest staff member of the Warren Commission, aiding its investigation into the assassination of President John F. Kennedy in 1963. From 1964 to 1965, Ely was a law clerk to Chief Justice Earl Warren of the U.S. Supreme Court. As a law clerk, Ely drafted the majority opinion in the landmark decision Hanna v. Plumer; he considered Warren his hero, later dedicating his landmark book, Democracy and Distrust, to him. Ely studied at the London School of Economics as a Fulbright scholar following his clerkship. Upon returning to the United States, he spent some time as part of the Military Police Corps and, despite being overqualified for the job, took a modest position as a public defender in San Diego.

== Academic career ==
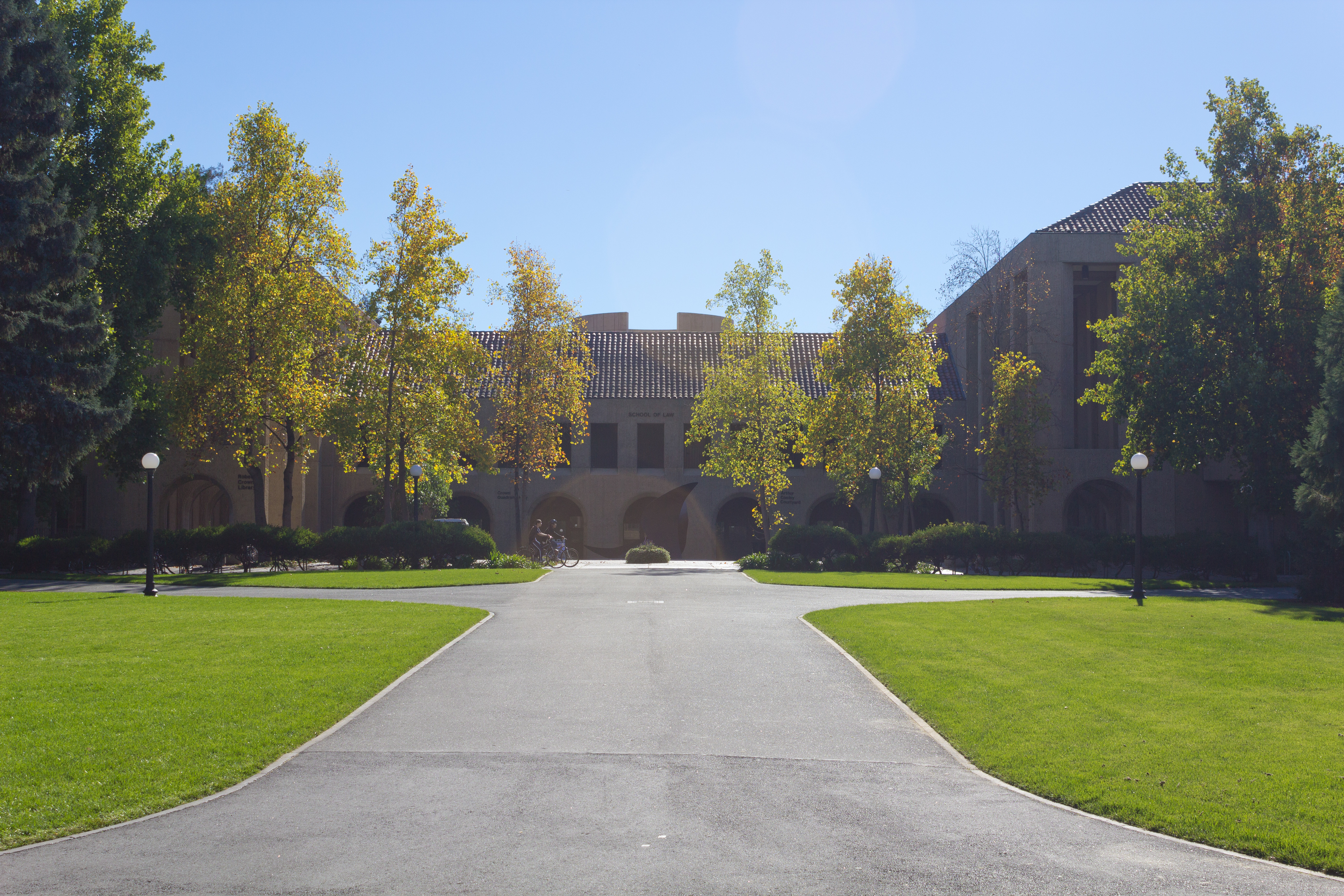
From 1982 until 1996, Ely taught at and was dean of Stanford Law School (pictured)

In 1968, Ely joined the faculty of Yale Law School. For five years, he served as a professor at Yale before moving to teach at Harvard Law School in 1973—holding the school's first chair in constitutional law. During this period, he wrote several influential law review articles, including his highly critical analysis of the Supreme Court's decision in Roe v. Wade in an article entitled "The Wages of Crying Wolf," published in the Yale Law Journal. For a brief period, he took a year's leave to serve as general counsel to the U.S. Department of Transportation and spent a year at the Woodrow Wilson International Center for Scholars of the Smithsonian Institution.

In 1982, Ely left his place at Harvard in order to serve as the dean of Stanford Law School, remaining with the faculty until 1996. At Stanford, his tenure as dean was marked by a program to implement a loan forgiveness program for public interest lawyers and to revitalize the law school's curriculum—something he described as "a boring wasteland". A liberal Democrat, he also worked to advance the university's social justice and diversity. At the end of his deanship in 1987, Ely continued teaching at Stanford as its Robert E. Paradise Professor of Law and developed an interest in subjects concerning congressional war powers.

Prompted by his love of scuba diving, Ely visited the University of Miami School of Law in 1996. Upon discovering he liked the city and the faculty, he chose to stay and became the university's Richard A. Hausler Professor of Law—the law school's most distinguished chair.

== Scholarship ==
=== The Wages of Crying Wolf ===
In 1973, Ely's article entitled "The Wages of Crying Wolf: A Comment on Roe v. Wade" was published in the Yale Law Journal. The article was a vociferous criticism of the Supreme Court's decision in Roe v. Wade which had given a constitutional basis for a right to abortion. Despite his own personal views in support of the availability of abortions, Ely was critical of the Court's decision to utilize the doctrine of substantive due process, arguing that since the Court's ruling was untethered from the constitution's text, it had "no business imposing it." He further contended that justices of the Supreme Court had an obligation to establish constitutional rights "in some identifiable constitutional value" before barring states from imposing their own regulations on abortion:

What is frightening about Roe is that this super-protected right is not inferable from the language of the Constitution, the framers' thinking respecting the specific problem in issue, any general value derivable from the provisions they included, or the nation's governmental structure. Nor is it explainable in terms of the unusual political impotence of the group judicially protected vis-à-vis the interest that legislatively prevailed over it.

Ely agreed that a right of privacy can be inferred from various provisions in the Constitution and that the right was grounded in its history, text, and theory. However, he saw no reason why it would have included a right to abortion, why that right would be fundamental, and why the countervailing interests of protecting the fetus did not count as part of a disenfranchised minority. Towards the end of his article, he wrote:

It is, nevertheless, a very bad decision. Not because it will perceptibly weaken the Court—it won't; and not because it conflicts with either my idea of progress or what the evidence suggests is society's—it doesn't. It is bad because it is bad constitutional law, or rather because it is not constitutional law and gives almost no sense of an obligation to try to be.

The Wages of Crying Wolf projected a profound influence over legal opinions concerning Roe, with the article eventually becoming the third most-cited work in the history of The Yale Law Journal according to a 1991 study by Fred R. Shapiro. A similar ranking by Shapiro in 2012 placed it as the 20th most-cited law review article of all time. In a 2022 piece for The New York Times, Emily Bazelon described it as having "eviscerated Blackmun's opinion," with Linda Greenhouse stating that Ely "sent Roe into the world disabled...It really was very damaging. Not because the American public cared about doctrine—they cared about results—but because it left Roe without friends in high places." When the Supreme Court overruled Roe in Dobbs v. Jackson Women's Health Organization, Justice Samuel Alito cited Wages as an example of the academic criticism it faced.

=== Democracy and Distrust ===
While a professor at Harvard, Ely produced his most notable work: the book Democracy and Distrust: A Theory of Judicial Review, published in 1980. It would become one of the most influential works about American constitutional law and among the most praised for deconstructing—and defending—the doctrine of judicial review on procedural grounds. Democracy and Distrust rejected theories which had no basis in the constitutional "text, history, or structure", using political theory as opposed to originalism to serve as argumentative foundations.

The book may be viewed as two separate books: one criticizing constitutionally ungrounded legal theories and the other providing a theory for judicial interventions. Ely expounds a theory of constitutional interpretation known as political process theory, suggesting that judges ought to focus on maintaining a well-functioning democratic process and guard against systematic biases in the legislative process.

Ely asserts that the Supreme Court should interpret the Constitution so as to reinforce democratic processes and popular self-government by ensuring equal representation in the political process (as in the Court's decision in Baker v. Carr). He argues that the Constitution's unenumerated rights (such as the Ninth Amendment and the Privileges or Immunities Clause of the Fourteenth Amendment) are procedural rather than substantive in nature and thus protect rights to democratic processes but are not rights of a substantive nature. Justice Stone's Footnote Four from United States v. Carolene Products Co. (1938) is a chief inspiration for Ely's theory of judicial review.

The initial release of Democracy and Distrust was controversial; it received a large amount of criticism from academics, including a dismissive piece from Laurence Tribe published in the Yale Law Journal. (Note: In one example of such criticism, an early review of the book by Indiana University professor Stanley Conrad Fickle states that despite Ely's popularity, the book came across as "one of progressive disappointment".) However, a 1991 appraisal of the work by Michael J. Klarman concludes that "political process theory emerges relatively unscathed from attacks leveled by Ely's critics against its more global aspects." In a New York Times piece after Ely's death, Mark Tushnet called it "the most important work of constitutional scholarship in the two generations from the time it was published to now."

=== War and Responsibility ===
In 1993, Ely published his second book titled War and Responsibility: Constitutional Lessons of Vietnam and Its Aftermath, which criticized the Vietnam War and re-assessed the discussion of the War Powers Act. The book is presented in six chapters and the initial chapters put into question the constitutionality of the Vietnam War. Chapters four and five bring into question belligerent acts conducted by the United States against the states of Laos and Cambodia. Chapter six discusses the future of covert warfare as part of the government's diligence or lack of diligence in conducting its foreign affairs. The closing Appendix discusses the parameters of the War Powers Act.

== Personal life and death ==
In 1971, Ely married Nancy Halliday Ely-Raphel, who would later become the United States Ambassador to Slovenia. They had two sons: John and Robert. The two divorced and Ely married Gisela Cardonne Ely, a Miami-Dade Circuit Court judge.

On October 25, 2003, Ely died in his Miami home at Coconut Grove after a long battle with cancer. His funeral was held at Coral Gables Congregational Church.

== Awards and honors ==
In 1981, Ely was elected a member of the American Academy of Arts and Sciences. The next year, he received the 1982 Triennial Award of the Order of the Coif for Democracy and Distrust. As the primary subject of the Virginia Law Review, the journal dedicated its May 1991 issue to examining Ely's book in the decade since it had been published.

Ely was the recipient of multiple honorary degrees including those from the University of San Diego and the Chicago-Kent College of Law. In 2003, Ely was awarded an honorary doctorate from Yale Law School; the award's citation read: "Your work set the standard for constitutional scholarship for our generation." Following his death in October of that same year, the school held a November symposium in his honor titled "On Democratic Ground: New Perspectives on John Hart Ely."

In her 2011 book on Hans Kelsen, Sandrine Baume identified Ely as a significant defender of the "compatibility of judicial review with the very principles of democracy". Ely was listed alongside Ronald Dworkin as one of the foremost defenders of this principle in recent years.

== Selected works ==
=== Books ===
- Ely, John Hart (1980). Democracy and Distrust. Harvard University Press. ISBN 978-0674196377.
- — (1995). War and Responsibility. Princeton University Press. ISBN 978-0691025520.
- — (1996). On Constitutional Ground. Princeton University Press. ISBN 978-0691025537.

=== Articles ===
- Ely, John Hart (1970). "Legislative and Administrative Motivation in Constitutional Law". Yale Law Journal. 79 (7): 1205–1342. JSTOR 795168.
- —; Dershowitz, Alan M. (1971). "Harris v. New York: Some Anxious Observations on the Candor and Logic of the Emerging Nixon Majority". Yale Law Journal. 80 (6): 1198–1228. JSTOR 795277.
- — (1973). "The Wages of Crying Wolf: A Comment on Roe v. Wade" (PDF). Yale Law Journal. 82 (5): 920–49. JSTOR 795536. PMID 11663374.
- — (1974). "The Irrepressible Myth of Erie". Harvard Law Review. 87 (4): 693–740. JSTOR 1339870.
- — (1974). "The Constitutionality of Reverse Racial Discrimination". University of Chicago Law Review. 41 (4): 723–41. JSTOR 1599097.
- — (1975). "Flag Desecration: A Case Study in the Roles of Categorization and Balancing in First Amendment Analysis". Harvard Law Review. 88 (7): 1482–1508. JSTOR 1340121.
- — (1978). "Constitutional Interpretivism: Its Allure and Impossibility". Indiana Law Journal. 53 (3): 399–448.
- — (1978). "The Supreme Court, 1977 Term — Foreword: On Discovering Fundamental Values". Harvard Law Review. 92 (1): 5–55. JSTOR 1340566.
- — (1988). "Suppose Congress Wanted a War Powers Act That Worked". Columbia Law Review. 88 (7): 1379–1431. JSTOR 1122735.
- — (1991). "Another Such Victory: Constitutional Theory and Practice in a World Where Courts Are No Different from Legislatures". Virginia Law Review. 77 (4): 833–879. JSTOR 1073298.
- — (1997). "Standing to Challenge Pro-Minority Gerrymanders". Harvard Law Review. 111 (2): 576–95. JSTOR 1342059.
- — (1998). "Gerrymanders: The Good, the Bad, and the Ugly". Stanford Law Review. 50 (3): 607–41. JSTOR 1229319.

== See also ==
- Doctrine of Absurdity
- List of law clerks for the chief justice of the United States
