= Guyora Binder =

Legal clerk and academic (born 1956)

Guyora Binder (born 7 November 1956) is a legal scholar and writer.

Binder has been faculty at University at Buffalo Law School and Boston University School of Law, and has been published in the Boston University Law Review.

In 2012, he wrote Felony Murder, an examination of the felony murder crime in the US.

== Publications ==
- Kaplan, John; Weisberg, Robert; Binder, Guyora (2021). Criminal Law: Cases and Materials. Wolters Kluwer. ISBN 154383115X.
- Binder, Guyora (2012). Felony Murder. Stanford University Press. ISBN 0804781702.
- Binder, Guyora; Weisberg, Robert (2000). Literary Criticisms of Law. Princeton University Press. ISBN 1400823633.
