= Stanford Law School =

Law school of Stanford University, California, U.S

- Parent school: Stanford University
- Established: 1893; 133 years ago
- School type: Private law school
- Parent endowment: $37.8 billion (2021)
- Dean: George Triantis
- Location: Stanford, California, United States; 37°25′27″N 122°10′04″W
- Enrollment: 570 (2025)
- Faculty: 98 (2024–2025)
- USNWR ranking: 1st (2026)
- Bar pass rate: 98.25%
- Website: law.stanford.edu
- ABA profile: Standard 509 Report

Stanford Law School (SLS) is the law school of Stanford University. It was established in 1893. George Triantis currently serves as dean.

Stanford Law School employs 98 full-time and 128 part-time faculty members and enrolls approximately 570 students who are working toward their Juris Doctor (J.D.) degree. Stanford Law also confers four advanced legal degrees: a Master of Laws (LL.M.), a Master of Legal Studies (M.L.S.), a Master of the Science of Law (J.S.M.), and a Doctor of the Science of Law (J.S.D.). Each fall, Stanford Law enrolls a J.D. class of approximately 190 students, giving Stanford the smallest student body of any law school ranked in the top fourteen (T14). Stanford also maintains eleven full-time legal clinics, including the nation's first and most active Supreme Court litigation clinic, and offers 27 formal joint degree programs.

== History ==
Stanford first offered a curriculum in legal studies in 1893, when the university hired its first two law professors: former U.S. president Benjamin Harrison and Nathan Abbott - who attended Boston University School of Law. Abbott headed the new program and assembled a small faculty over the next few years. The law department primarily enrolled undergraduate majors at this time and included a large number of students who might not have been welcome at more traditional law schools at the time, including women and students of color, especially Hispanic, Chinese and Japanese students.

In 1900, the department moved from its original location in Encina Hall to the northeast side of the Inner Quadrangle. These larger facilities included Stanford's first law library. Beginning to focus more on professional training, the school implemented its first three-year curriculum and became one of 27 charter members of the Association of American Law Schools (AALS). In 1901, the school awarded its first professional degree, the Bachelor of Laws (LL.B.).

Starting in 1908, the law department began its transition into an exclusively professional school when Stanford's Board of Trustees passed a resolution to officially change its name from Law Department to Law School. Eight years later, Frederic Campbell Woodward became the first dean of the law school, and in 1923, the law school received accreditation from the American Bar Association (ABA). In 1924, Stanford's law program officially transitioned into a modern professional school when it began requiring a bachelor's degree for admission.

The 1940s and 1950s brought considerable change to the law school. After World War II caused the law school's enrollment to drop to fewer than 30 students, the school quickly expanded once the war ended in 1945. A move to a new location in the Outer Quadrangle, as well as the 1948 opening of the law school dormitory Crothers Hall (the result of a donation by Stanford Law graduate George E. Crothers), allowed the school to grow, while the 1948 inaugural publication of the Stanford Law Review (helmed by future U.S. Secretary of State Warren Christopher '49) helped to augment the law school's national reputation. The decision that Stanford should remain a small law school with a very limited enrollment emerged during this period. For the third time in its history, the law school relocated in the 1970s, this time to its current location in the Crown Quadrangle.

In the 1960s and 1970s, the law school aimed to diversify its student body. During this period, students established a large number of new and progressive student organizations, including the Women of Stanford Law, the Stanford Chicano Law Student Association, the Environmental Law Society, and the Stanford Public Interest Foundation. Additionally, in 1966, the school sought to academically diversify its student body by collaborating with the Stanford Business School to create its first joint-degree program. A year earlier, in 1965, the law school enrolled its first black student, Sallyanne Payton '68, and in 1972, the school hired its first female law professor, Barbara A. Babcock, and its first professor of color, William B. Gould IV. In 1968, Stanford appointed Thelton Henderson, future judge of the U.S. District Court for the Northern District of California, as the first assistant dean for minority admissions. Henderson expanded minority enrollment from a single student to approximately a fifth of the student body. Stanford Law's commitment to diversity continues today, and The Princeton Review currently ranks Stanford Law as one of the ten best law schools for minority students.

Earning national recognition in the 1980s and 1990s, the law school embarked on innovating its curriculum. Stanford offered new courses focusing on law and technology, environmental law, intellectual property law, and international law, allowing students to specialize in emerging legal fields. In 1984, it launched its first clinical program, the East Palo Alto Community Law Project. By the 21st century, a new focus on interdisciplinary education emerged. In 2009, it transitioned from a semester system to a quarter system to align itself with Stanford's other graduate schools. Stanford also expanded its upper-level offerings in international law, by adding new clinics, academic centers, and simulation courses, and expanded its joint degree programs.

== Academics ==
Clinics

Stanford Law School is known for its student-to-faculty ratio (4.3 to 1), one of the lowest in the country. The first-year class of approximately 180 students is divided into six smaller sections of 30 students each.

The academic program is flexible. First-year students (or 1Ls) are required to take Civil Procedure, Contracts, Torts, and Legal Research & Writing during the autumn quarter, and Criminal Law, Constitutional Law, Federal Litigation, and one elective during the winter quarter. In the spring quarter, they take Federal Litigation, Property, and enroll in electives. Stanford Law offers 280 course titles beyond the first-year curriculum, and advanced courses range from White-Collar Crime to a Supreme Court Simulation Seminar. Additionally, because of the law school's proximity to other academic programs on campus, there is a strong focus on joint-degree programs and interdisciplinary learning, and upper-level students may take classes at Stanford's other professional and graduate schools.

The Robert Crown Law Library at Stanford holds 500,000 books, 360,000 microform and audiovisual items, and more than 8,000 current serial subscriptions.

=== Admissions and costs ===
Between 4,000 and 5,000 students apply for admission each year. Selection is competitive: the median undergraduate grade point average of admitted students is 3.92 and the median LSAT score is 173 (out of 180). Beyond numbers, Stanford places considerable emphasis on factors such as extracurricular activities, work experience, and prior graduate study. About three quarters of the members of each entering class have one or more years of prior work experience and over a quarter have another graduate degree. The school also accepts a small number of transfers each year.

The total cost of attendance (indicating the cost of tuition, fees, and living expenses) at Stanford Law School for the 2023–24 academic year is $112,364. A 2015 study by M7 Financial, which assessed law schools' "credit ratings" using data on average starting salaries, employment trends, and student loan obligations, found that Stanford Law had the lowest student debt burden of any law school in the study.

=== Grading ===
In August 2008, Stanford Law School changed its grading system, which no longer relies on traditional letter grades, joining Yale Law School, the University of California, Berkeley School of Law, and Harvard Law School. Students now receive one of four grades: honors, pass, restricted credit, or no credit. Unlike Harvard Law School and Yale Law School, Stanford Law School enforces strict curves which cap the number of honors grades to around 30%. As part of Stanford's grade reform, the law school no longer awards the honors of the Order of the Coif or Graduation with Distinction.

=== Clinics and centers ===
Stanford Law enables second- and third-year students to gain hands-on experience by working full-time in one of eleven legal clinics, including an Environmental Law Clinic, Criminal Defense Clinic, a Religious Liberty Clinic, and an Intellectual Property and Innovation Clinic. The Supreme Court Litigation Clinic has successfully brought over thirty cases before the Court, making it one of the most active Supreme Court practices of any kind. The clinic has served as lead counsel or co-lead counsel on the merits in numerous cases, including Kennedy v. Louisiana (2008), Melendez-Diaz v. Massachusetts (2009), United States v. Windsor (2013), Riley v. California (2014), and Bourke v. Beshear (2015).

- Stanford Constitutional Law Center
- Stanford Criminal Justice Center (SCJC)
- Stanford Three Strikes Project
- Environmental and Natural Resources Law & Policy Program (ENRLP)
- Steyer-Taylor Center for Energy Policy and Finance
- China Guiding Cases Project (CGCP)
- Rule of Law Program
- Stanford Center on International Conflict and Negotiation (SCICN)
- Stanford Human Rights Center
- Stanford Program in International and Comparative Law
- Stanford Program in Law and Society
- Arthur and Toni Rembe Rock Center for Corporate Governance
- John M. Olin Program in Law and Economics
- Securities Class Action Clearinghouse (SCAC)
- Center for E-Commerce
- Center for Internet and Society
- Center for Law and the Biosciences
- Stanford Center for Legal Informatics (CodeX)
- Fair Use Project
- Stanford Center in Law, Science, & Technology
- Stanford Program in Neuroscience and Society (SPINS)
- Transatlantic Technology Law Forum
- Stanford Center on the Legal Profession
- Martin Daniel Gould Center for Conflict Resolution Programs
- Gould Negotiation and Mediation Teaching Program
- Center for Internet and Society (CIS)
- John and Terry Levin Center for Public Service and Public Interest Law
- Stanford Intellectual and Developmental Disabilities Law and Policy Project (SIDDLAPP)

The Stanford Center for Legal Informatics, often known simply as CodeX, is a research center at Stanford University focused on the application of technology to law and is jointly operated by Stanford Law School and Stanford University School of Engineering.

Launched in 2013, Stanford's Law and Policy Lab provides further opportunities for experiential learning. The Policy Lab allows second- and third-year students to enroll in faculty-supervised policy practicums, where students work in small teams to conduct policy research and analysis for real-world clients. Topics have ranged from wildlife trafficking to prison realignment to copyright reform, and prior clients include California Attorney General Kamala Harris, Governor of California Jerry Brown, the California Law Revision Commission, the U.S. Copyright Office, the U.S. Department of Energy, the U.S. Department of the Treasury, and the White House Office of Management and Budget.

=== Publications ===
Outside of the classroom, Stanford Law students run over fifty student organizations and publish seven legal journals. The most influential journal is the Stanford Law Review, which has been ranked as the top law review by the Washington & Lee Law Review Rankings in both 2013 and 2014. Advocacy skills are tested in the Marion Rice Kirkwood Moot Court competition.

- Stanford Law Review
- Stanford Journal of International Law
- Stanford Law & Policy Review
- Stanford Journal of Law, Business & Finance
- Stanford Technology Law Review
- Stanford Environmental Law Journal
- Stanford Journal of Civil Rights & Civil Liberties
- Stanford Journal of AI/Web3 Law & Policy

== Reception ==
=== Student experience survey ===
Students and alumni routinely report high satisfaction with their academic experience. In surveys conducted by Above the Law, Stanford Law received an "A+" from both students and alumni for their satisfaction with Stanford's academic program, and the law school also received an "A+" rating from students for practical/clinical training, career counseling, and financial aid advising. Based on surveys with students at the nation's 169 best law schools, The Princeton Review currently ranks Stanford Law as having the best "Classroom Experience", and students provided Stanford with the highest score (99) for its "Academic Experience Rating" and "Professors Interesting Rating". Additionally, the 2014 "Midlevel Associates Survey" conducted by The American Lawyer magazine found that based on mid-level associates' assessments of their legal education, Stanford Law placed in the top five law schools for effectively preparing its graduates for law firm life.

=== Bar passage rates ===
According to ABA Required Disclosures, Stanford Law School had an average bar passage rate of 94.41% in 2022.

In 2023, 94% of Stanford Law graduates passed the California Bar on their first attempt, the highest pass rate of all California law schools.

=== Employment ===
Upon graduation, about a third of the class clerks for a judge; about half join law firms.

According to Stanford Law School's official 2014 ABA-required disclosures, 90.4% of the Class of 2014 obtained full-time, long-term, JD-required employment nine months after graduation, excluding solo-practitioners. Stanford's Law School Transparency under-employment score is 3.2%, indicating the percentage of the Class of 2014 unemployed, pursuing an additional degree, or working in a non-professional, short-term, or part-time job nine months after graduation.

According to the American Bar Association, of 2014 Stanford Law graduates, 90.9% are employed in a position that required the graduate to pass the bar exam; 2.7% are employed in a position in which the employer sought an individual with a J.D. or in which the J.D. provided a demonstrable advantage in obtaining or performing the job, but which did not itself require an active law license; 2.7% are employed in other professional positions; 1.1% are pursuing graduate work full-time; 1.1% have a deferred employment starting date; and 1.6% are unemployed and seeking employment.

Despite its small size, Stanford Law has the third highest (per capita) placement rate for law professors at the nation's 43 leading law schools, according to a 2011 study, and has achieved the second-highest (per capita) placement rate for U.S. Supreme Court clerkships, according to a 2013 finding. Stanford Law alumni have clerked for the U.S. Supreme Court every year for the past 40 years. Based on a 2012 to 2014 average, Stanford Law has also achieved the second-highest (per capita) placement rate for federal judicial clerkships, and for the class of 2014, reported the highest placement rate for federal judicial clerkships at 30.5%. Stanford Law currently has the highest percentage of its graduates clerking for federal judges of any law school in the United States. Multiple Stanford Law alumni have also clerked for the International Court of Justice.

=== In popular culture ===
- The 2001 film Legally Blonde was originally set at Stanford Law School, which is also the setting of the book it is based on; however, Stanford did not approve of the script, so the setting was changed to Harvard.

== People ==
=== Faculty ===
The Stanford Law School faculty ranks within the top 5–10 range in the United States in terms of scholarly impact, lower than its USNews rank, and faculty members include some of the most widely cited legal scholars in intellectual property law (Mark Lemley) and legal ethics (Deborah L. Rhode). A 2012 study found that five Stanford Law professors are among the 50 most relevant law professors in the nation, and a 2013 study found that 25 percent of Stanford Law School's tenured faculty have been elected to the American Academy of Arts & Sciences.

In 2013, The National Law Journal recognized Professors Jeffrey L. Fisher and Mark Lemley as two of the 100 most influential lawyers in America, and in 2014, a study by Reuters identified former Dean Kathleen M. Sullivan and Professors Jeffrey L. Fisher, Pamela S. Karlan, and Brian Wolfman as among the 66 most successful appellate litigators before the U.S. Supreme Court.

==== Current faculty ====
- Joseph Bankman – tax law
- Ralph Richard Banks – family law, employment discrimination law, race and the law
- Paul Brest (emeritus) – former Dean of the law school; constitutional law, judgment and decision-making
- Gerhard Casper (emeritus) – former President of Stanford University; constitutional law scholar
- Joshua Cohen (emeritus) – political theorist and philosopher
- John J. Donohue III – law and economics, empirical analysis
- Jeffrey L. Fisher – co-director of the Stanford Supreme Court Litigation Clinic and appellate litigator who has argued more than 40 cases before the U.S. Supreme Court
- Richard Thompson Ford - civil rights, local & state government, critical theory; named one of Esquire's Best-Dressed Real Men in 2009
- Barbara Fried - legal theory
- Lawrence M. Friedman – legal historian
- Paul Goldstein – international intellectual property, copyright, trademark; author of best-selling legal fiction novels
- Thomas C. Grey (emeritus) – legal theory, modern American legal thought, constitutional law
- Joseph Grundfest – corporate governance and securities litigation
- Thomas Heller – international trade and tax specialist
- Pamela S. Karlan – co-director of the Stanford Supreme Court Litigation Clinic; election law and constitutional law scholar who previously served as the U.S. Deputy Assistant Attorney General for Voting Rights in the Civil Rights Division of the U.S. Department of Justice
- Mark Kelman - Vice Dean of the law school; application of social sciences to law
- Michael Klausner – corporate law, business transactions, corporate governance, financial regulation
- Larry Kramer – constitutional law, conflict of laws
- Mark Lemley – intellectual property law, patent law, law and technology
- Jennifer Martínez – Provost of Stanford University since 2023; former Dean of the law school (2019-2023); human rights and international law scholar; represented José Padilla before the U.S. Supreme Court
- Michael W. McConnell – constitutional law scholar and former Judge of the United States Court of Appeals for the Tenth Circuit
- Nathaniel Persily – election law and constitutional law scholar
- A. Mitchell Polinsky – law and economics
- Deborah Sivas – environmental law
- Jane S. Schacter – sexual orientation law, statutory interpretation, constitutional law
- Barton Thompson – natural resources law
- Allen S. Weiner – international law scholar
- Robert Weisberg – criminal law and law and literature

==== Visiting faculty and lecturers ====
- Viola Canales – former litigator, short story author, and published novelist
- Lanhee Chen – lecturer in law and former chief policy advisor to Mitt Romney
- Mariano-Florentino Cuéllar – visiting professor, current Justice of the Supreme Court of California, former White House official, and former Stanley Morrison Professor of Law at Stanford
- Russ Feingold – lecturer in law and former U.S. Senator
- Bertram Fields – lecturer in law and entertainment attorney
- Benjamin Ginsberg – lecturer in law and former national counsel to the 2000 and 2004 Bush-Cheney presidential campaigns
- Jennifer Granick – intellectual property and First Amendment scholar and practitioner
- Thomas B. Griffith – lecturer in law and current judge of the U.S. Court of Appeals for the District of Columbia Circuit
- Goodwin Liu – lecturer in law and current Associate Justice of the Supreme Court of California

==== Former faculty ====
- Michelle Alexander – associate professor of law and author of The New Jim Crow
- Anthony G. Amsterdam – professor of clinical education (1969–1981)
- Barbara Allen Babcock (emerita) – criminal law, civil procedure, women's legal history
- Tom Campbell – professor of law (1987–2002), associate professor of law (1983–1987)
- Barbara A. Caulfield – lecturer in law (1988–2010)
- Mariano-Florentino Cuéllar – professor of law (2001–2015), visiting professor and Herman Phleger Professor (2015–2021), current president of the Carnegie Endowment for International Peace; administrative law, legislation, international law, executive power, artificial intelligence
- John Hart Ely – professor of law (1982–1996); former Dean (1982–1987)
- Tom Goldstein – clinical lecturer (2004–2012); co-founder of the Stanford Supreme Court Litigation Clinic
- Gerald Gunther – professor of law (1962–1995), professor emeritus (1995–2002)
- Lawrence Lessig – professor of law (2000–2009); founder of the Stanford Center for Internet and Society
- M. Elizabeth Magill – former Dean of the law school; constitutional law and administrative law scholar
- Lia Matera – teaching fellow
- Richard Posner – associate professor of law (1968–1969)
- Margaret Jane Radin – professor of law (1989–2006)
- Deborah L. Rhode – legal ethics, gender and the law; former president of the Association of American Law Schools
- Joseph Tyree Sneed, III – professor of law (1962–1971)
- Kathleen M. Sullivan – professor of law (1992–2012); former Dean (1999–2004)
- Luke W. Cole – Professor of Environmental Law

=== Alumni ===
Stanford Law School alumni practice in 61 countries, 50 U.S. states, Puerto Rico, the U.S. Virgin Islands, Guam, the Marshall Islands, and Washington D.C. Stanford Law alumni are partners at 87 of the 100 largest law firms in the United States; 94 of the largest law firms employ Stanford Law alumni as attorneys. Consistent with Stanford's expertise in law and technology, Stanford Law graduates currently work or have previously worked as general counsels for many of the leading high-tech companies, including Microsoft, Google, Cisco, eBay, Yahoo!, Qualcomm, Oracle, and Genentech.

The law school's alumni include several of the first women to occupy Chief Justice or Associate Justice posts on supreme courts: former Chief Justice of New Zealand Sian Elias, retired U.S. Supreme Court Justice Sandra Day O'Connor, and the late Chief Justice of Washington Barbara Durham. Other justices of supreme courts who graduated from Stanford Law include the late Chief Justice of the United States William Rehnquist, retired Chief Justice of California Supreme Court Ronald M. George, retired California Supreme Court Justice Carlos R. Moreno, and the late California Supreme Court Justice Frank K. Richardson.

== See also ==
- Dean of Stanford Law School
- Stanford Center for Computers and the Law
- 2023 Student protest of Judge Kyle Duncan
