= George Triantis =

Academic and lawyer (born 1961)

Dean of Stanford Law School
- Incumbent
- Assumed office June 17, 2024
- Preceded by: Jenny Martinez

Personal details
- Education: University of Toronto (BA, JD); University of Virginia (LLM); Stanford University (JSD)

George G. Triantis is an American lawyer and academic who has been the dean of Stanford Law School since June 2024.

He is currently the Charles J. Meyers Professor at Stanford Law School and formerly the James and Patricia Kowal Professor of Law, Associate Dean for Research, and faculty co-director of the Stanford Cyber Initiative. He was also previously the Eli Goldston Professor at Harvard Law School, and is also an Elected Fellow of the American Academy of Arts & Sciences.

== Legal career ==
After receiving his bachelor's degree and Juris Doctor from the University of Toronto, Triantis moved to the University of Virginia School of Law, where he received his Master of Laws. After attending Stanford and obtaining his Doctor of Juridical Science, Triantis returned to the University of Virginia as a professor.

=== Stanford Law School ===
==== Professorship ====
Triantis joined the Stanford Law School faculty in 2011, where he specialized in contract and business law.

==== Dean of Stanford Law School ====
In June 2024, Traintis was announced as the Dean of Stanford Law School after a series of leadership shuffles amidst controversies around free speech within the law school.

During his tenure, Traintis has also advocated for further research into artificial intelligence's integration into the legal system.
