= Penumbra (law) =

Rights derived from rights protected in the Bill of Rights

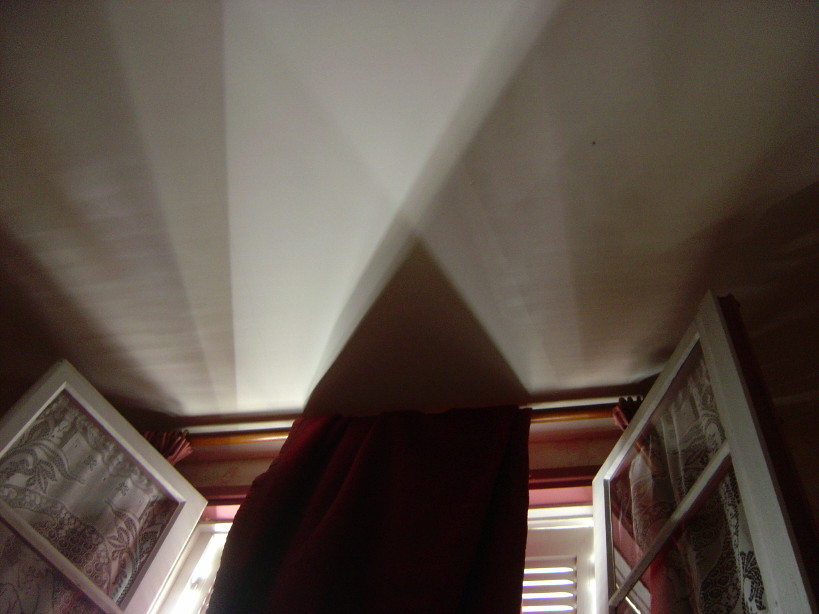
Umbra, penumbra, and antumbra formed through windows and shutters. Jurists have used the term "penumbra" as a metaphor for rights implied in the constitution.

In United States constitutional law, the penumbra includes a group of rights derived, by implication, from other rights explicitly protected in the Bill of Rights. These rights have been identified through a process of "reasoning-by-interpolation", where specific principles are recognized from "general idea[s]" that are explicitly expressed in other constitutional provisions. Although researchers have traced the origin of the term to the nineteenth century, the term first gained significant popular attention in 1965, when Justice William O. Douglas's majority opinion in Griswold v. Connecticut identified a right to privacy in the penumbra of the constitution.

== Origins of the term ==
Commentators disagree about the precise origin of the use of the term penumbra in American legal scholarship, but most believe it was first used in the late nineteenth century. Burr Henly, for example, traces the first use of the word to an 1873 law review article written by Oliver Wendell Holmes, in which he argued that it is better for new law to grow "in the penumbra between darkness and light, than to remain in uncertainty". Luis Sirico and Henry T. Greely, on the other hand, trace the term to Justice Stephen Johnson Field's 1871 circuit court opinion in Montgomery v. Bevans, where Justice Field used the term to describe a period of time in which it was uncertain whether an individual could legally be considered deceased. Other commentators, including Glenn H. Reynolds and Brannon P. Denning, note that elements of penumbral reasoning can be found in much older cases that precede the first use of the term penumbra; they trace the origins of penumbral reasoning to United States Supreme Court cases from the early nineteenth century. For example, Reynolds and Denning describe Chief Justice John Marshall's opinion in McCulloch v. Maryland as "the quintessential example of penumbral reasoning".

== Definition ==
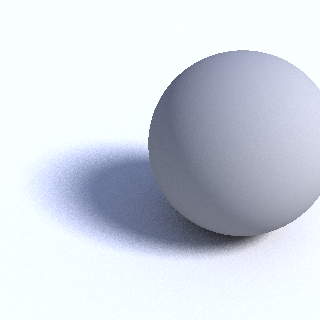
The primary scientific definition of the word "penumbra" refers to the area of partial illumination "between the perfect shadow on all sides and the full light", represented here as the area of soft shadow.

Although the meaning of the term has varied over time, scholars now generally agree that the term refers to a group of rights that are not explicitly stated in the constitution, but can be inferred from other enumerated rights. The definition of the term was originally derived from its primary scientific meaning, which is "a space of partial illumination (as in an eclipse) between the perfect shadow on all sides and the full light". By analogy, rights that exist in the constitution's penumbra can be found in the "shadows" of other portions of the constitution. Additionally, the process of identifying rights in constitutional penumbras is known as penumbral reasoning. Brannon P. Denning and Glenn H. Reynolds have described this interpretive framework as the process of "drawing logical inferences by looking at relevant parts of the Constitution as a whole and their relationship to one another." Glenn H. Reynolds has also characterized penumbral reasoning as a process of "reasoning-by-interpolation" where judges identify the full scope and extent of constitutional rights.

=== Definitions prior to Griswold v. Connecticut ===
The term penumbra first appeared in an opinion published by the Supreme Court of the United States in 1916, and the term appeared ten more times in published opinions between 1916 and 1941. Between 1941 and the date of publication of Griswold v. Connecticut, the term was used eight times by Justice William O. Douglas and four times by other Justices. Second Circuit Court of Appeals Judge Learned Hand also used the term eleven times between 1915 and 1950, usually to place emphasis on words or concepts that were ambiguous. For example, in Commissioner v. Ickelheimer, Judge Hand wrote, "[t]he colloquial words of a statute have not the fixed and artificial content of scientific symbols; they have a penumbra, a dim fringe, a connotation, for they express an attitude of will, into which it is our duty to penetrate and which we must enforce ungrudgingly when we can ascertain it, regardless of imprecision in its expression".

Before Griswold, different Supreme Court Justices would often utilize different definitions of the term in different contexts, possibly because the Justices did not understand the meaning of the word. In Schlesinger v. Wisconsin, for example, Justice Oliver Wendell Holmes used the term to describe rights derived by implication. He wrote, "the law allows a penumbra to be embraced that goes beyond the outline of its object in order that the object may be secured". Likewise, in Olmstead v. United States, Justice Holmes argued that evidence obtained through wire-tapping should not be admitted at trial, and that "the penumbra of the Fourth and Fifth Amendments covers the defendant". However, in A.L.A. Schecter Poultry Corp. v. United States, Justice Benjamin Cardozo used the term to describe an area of uncertainty in the law. He wrote, "[t]here is no penumbra of uncertainty obscuring judgment here. To find immediacy or directness here is to find it almost everywhere". Additionally, in Coleman v. Miller, Justice Felix Frankfurter used the term in a manner that was more closely related to its traditional definition. When arguing that a group of legislators lacked standing, he wrote, "[n]o doubt the bounds of such legal interest have a penumbra which gives some freedom in judging fulfillment of our jurisdictional requirements".

=== Definition after Griswold v. Connecticut ===
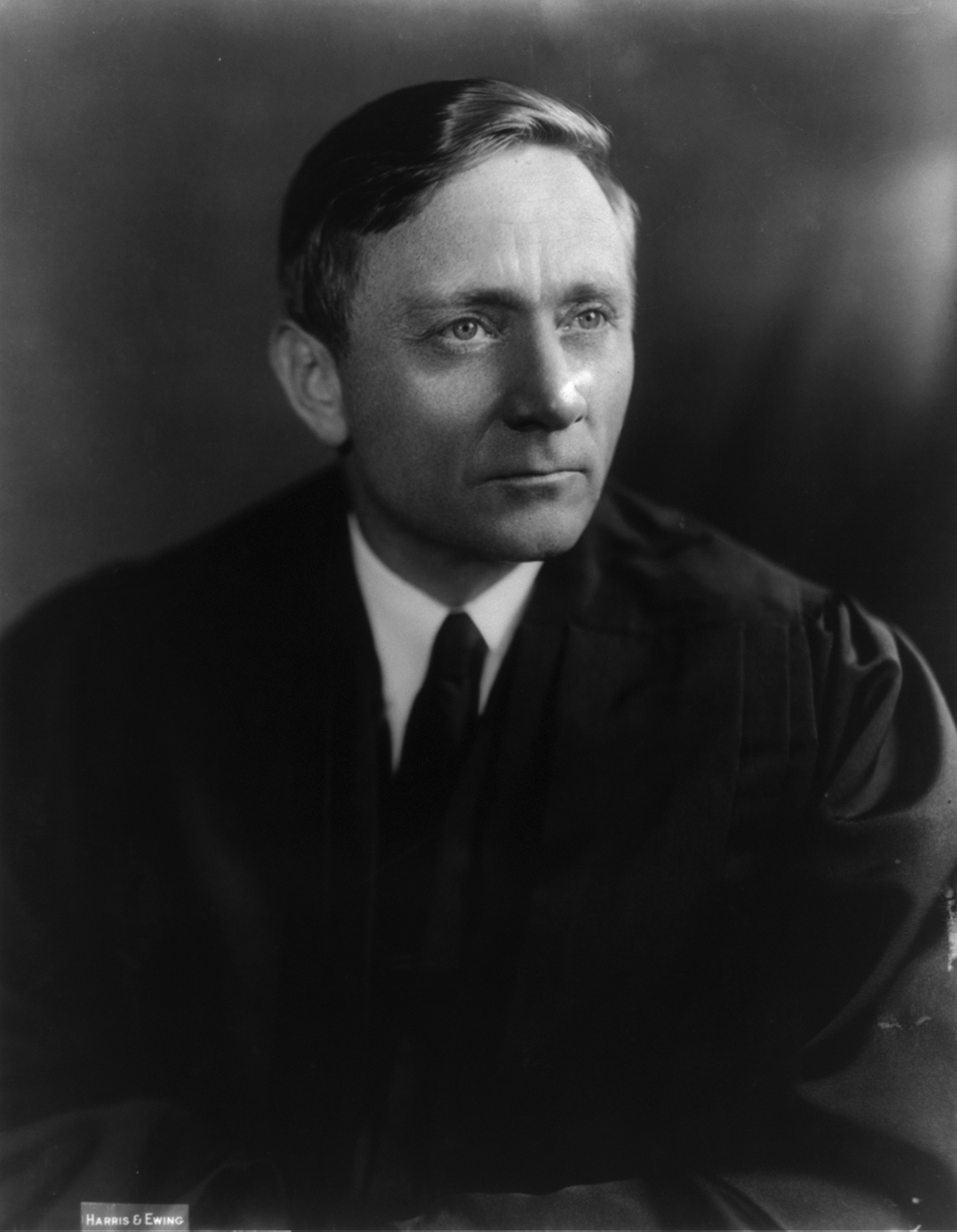
In Griswold, Justice William O. Douglas (pictured) explained that "specific guarantees in the Bill of Rights have penumbras, formed by emanations from those guarantees that help give them life and substance".

J. Christopher Rideout and Burr Henly note that the term achieved prominence after Justice Douglas' majority opinion in Griswold v. Connecticut held that a right to privacy existed in the penumbra of the constitution. In Griswold, the Supreme Court ultimately held that a Connecticut law that criminalized the use of contraception was unconstitutional. Writing for a majority of the Court, Justice Douglas held that the Connecticut law violated a fundamental right to privacy. After reviewing a line of cases in which the Supreme Court identified rights not explicitly enumerated in the constitution, Justice Douglas declared that "[t]he foregoing cases suggest that specific guarantees in the Bill of Rights have penumbras, formed by emanations from those guarantees that help give them life and substance". Justice Douglas argued that the Court could infer a right to privacy by looking at "zones of privacy" protected by First, Third, Fourth, Fifth, and Ninth Amendments:

Various guarantees create zones of privacy. The right of association contained in the penumbra of the First Amendment is one, as we have seen. The Third Amendment in its prohibition against the quartering of soldiers "in any house" in time of peace without the consent of the owner is another facet of that privacy. The Fourth Amendment explicitly affirms the "right of the people to be secure in their persons, houses, papers, and effects, against unreasonable searches and seizures." The Fifth Amendment in its Self-Incrimination Clause enables the citizen to create a zone of privacy which government may not force him to surrender to his detriment. The Ninth Amendment provides: "The enumeration in the Constitution, of certain rights, shall not be construed to deny or disparage others retained by the people."

Consequently, Justice Douglas argued that the constitution included "penumbral rights of privacy and repose." Justice Douglas also remarked that without "peripheral rights," the "specific rights" enumerated in the constitution would be "less secure". According to Burr Henly, Justice Douglas' majority opinion did not use the term to identify the articulable boundaries of language and the law, as Justice Holmes had done, but rather to connect the text of the constitution to unenumerated rights.

== Scholarly analysis of penumbral reasoning ==
Helen Hershkoff has described penumbral reasoning as "an important feature of American constitutional practice in cases involving individual rights and government power", and J. Christopher Rideout notes that many scholars have defended the "conceptual integrity" of penumbral reasoning. Likewise, Burr Henly has described the penumbra as "the most important" metaphor in American constitutional jurisprudence. Other scholars, including Judge A. Raymond Randolph of the United States Court of Appeals for the District of Columbia Circuit and historian David J. Garrow, also note that Justice Douglas' identification of the right to privacy in Griswold ultimately served as a doctrinal stepping-stone to Roe v. Wade, where the United States Supreme Court ruled that the right to privacy protects the right to terminate a pregnancy.

Glenn H. Reynolds has also observed that courts routinely engage in penumbral reasoning, regardless of their location on the political spectrum. However, former Ninth Circuit Judge Alex Kozinski and UCLA School of Law professor Eugene Volokh note that the use of penumbral reasoning by courts "cuts both ways" because it can be used to both expand individual liberties and to expand the powers of the government at the expense of individual liberty. Richard E. Levy also argued that penumbral reasoning, fundamental rights analyses, and political process theory can justify judicial intervention on behalf of individual liberty as well as judicial intervention to advance economic interests.

Despite the "pivotal" role that penumbral reasoning has played in American constitutional jurisprudence, the Supreme Court's use of penumbral reasoning has also generated controversy. District of Columbia Circuit Judge Robert Bork, for example, was a particularly vocal critic of Supreme Court rulings that identified rights that are not explicitly enumerated in the text of the constitution. Likewise, in his dissenting opinion in Griswold, Justice Hugo Black stated his concerns with finding a right to privacy in the penumbra of the constitution and that he disagreed with the majority's attempts to "stretch" the Bill of Rights. Additionally, Louis J. Sirico Jr. has described the term as "intellectually confusing", and William J. Watkins Jr. wrote that the penumbra of the constitution is "a seemingly strange place to discover constitutional guarantees". Robert J. Pushaw Jr. also described penumbral reasoning as a "transparently fictional" process, and Jennifer Fahnestock has cautioned that "implicit constitutional rights" are vulnerable to being lost "due to their lack of permanency".

== See also ==
- United States Bill of Rights
- Birth control movement in the United States
