= Climate Policy Initiative =

U.S. non-profit organization

- Climate Policy Initiative
- Abbreviation: CPI
- Formation: 2009; 17 years ago
- Founder: Thomas Heller
- Type: Nonprofit research group and international climate policy organization
- Location: San Francisco, California, U.S.
- Global Managing Director: Barbara Buchner
- Website: www.climatepolicyinitiative.org

External videos
- Climate Policy Initiative Youtube channel
- “A Conversation with Climate Policy Initiative”, Yale Center for Business and the Environment, April 21, 2020.

Climate Policy Initiative (CPI) is an independent non-profit research group and international climate policy organization based in San Francisco, California with other offices worldwide. CPI is supported primarily by philanthropic organizations and government development finance.

With over 150 analysts and advisors the climate think tank works to improve energy and land use policies around the world, with a particular focus on finance. It is considered a leading expert group in tracking global climate finance. Beginning with the Landscape of Climate Finance (2011), CPI has published a series of annual reports which examine both public and private financial flows worldwide. CPI also publishes in-depth case studies on the public sector's mobilization of private investment. As of 2021, CPI reported that flows of climate-related finance in and between countries account for only about 0.7% of the world’s GDP, far below the amount that is projected to be needed for climate mitigation and adaptation. The San Giorgio Group (SGG), a working group established by CPI and others in 2011, focuses on ways in which financing can support green low-emissions investment.

== History ==
Founded in 2009 by Thomas Heller, CPI is headquartered in San Francisco (United States). It also has offices in Rio de Janeiro, New Delhi, Jakarta, London, Washington DC, and Cape Town.

As of 2020, the Global Managing Director of Climate Policy Initiative is Barbara Buchner.

== Current fields of research ==
- Renewable energy & energy efficiency
- Policy & institutions
- Carbon finance
- Climate & development (for the scientific journal see Climate and Development)
- Forestry & land use

== Publications ==
CPI has published more than 500 studies on the previously listed fields of research, mainly in English, with some in Portuguese and Bahasa Indonesia (Malay). The studies are freely downloadable in its publications web page.

== See also ==
- Climate Finance
- Global warming
