= Larry Kramer (legal scholar) =

American legal scholar

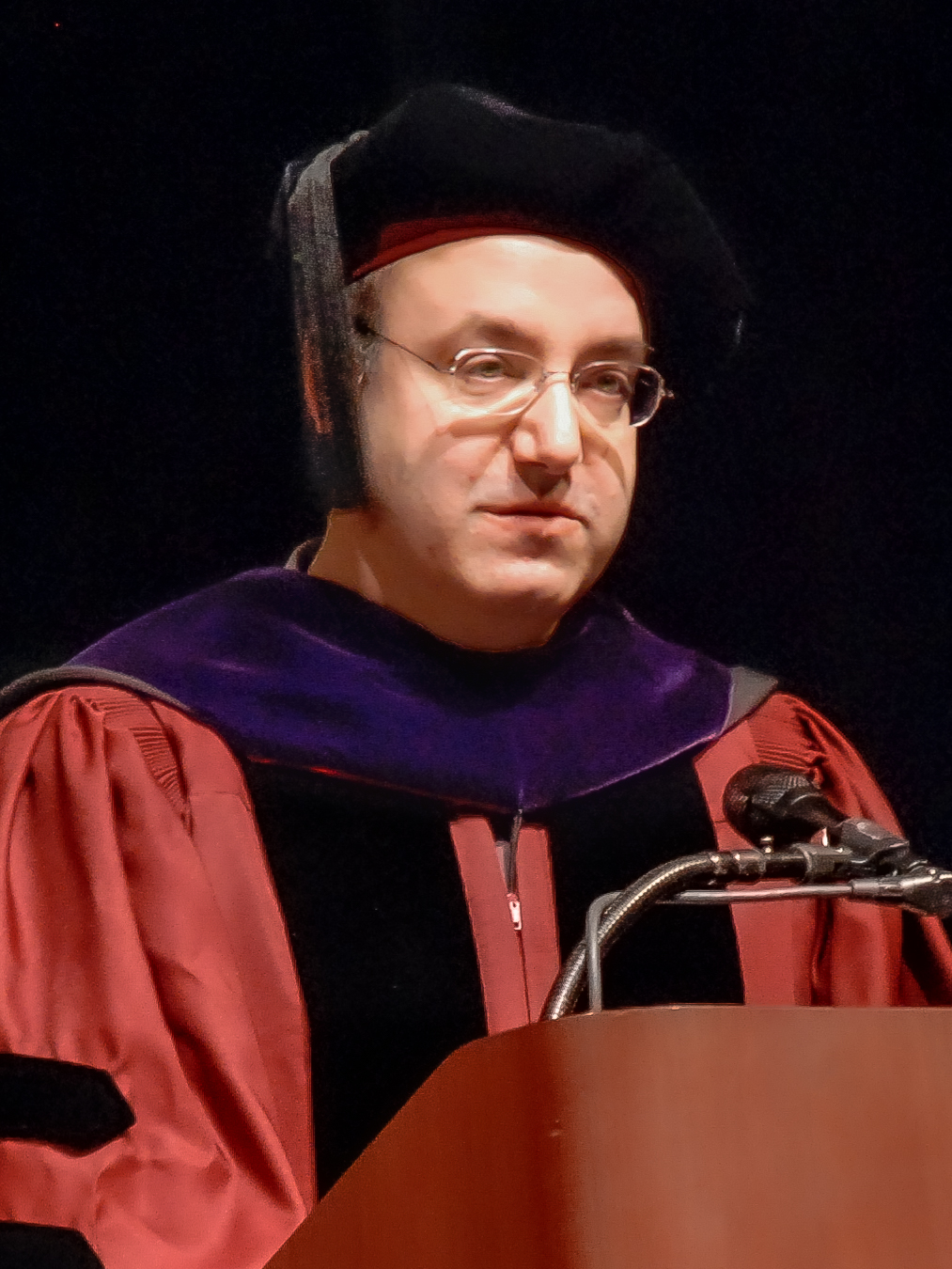
- Kramer in 2007

President and Vice Chancellor of the London School of Economics
- Incumbent
- Assumed office April 1, 2024
- Chancellor: The Princess Royal
- Preceded by: Minouche Shafik

4th President at the William and Flora Hewlett Foundation
- In office 2012–2024
- Preceded by: Paul Brest
- Succeeded by: Amber D. Miller

12th Dean of Stanford Law School
- In office 2004–2012
- Preceded by: Kathleen Sullivan
- Succeeded by: M. Elizabeth Magill

Personal details
- Born: June 23, 1958 (age 67) Chicago, Illinois, U.S.
- Spouse: Sarah Kramer Delson
- Children: Kiki Kramer
- Education: Brown University (BA); University of Chicago (JD)

Larry D. Kramer (born June 23, 1958) is an American legal scholar who has been the president and vice chancellor of the London School of Economics since 2024. Previously, he was president of the William and Flora Hewlett Foundation from 2012 to 2023. Prior to that role, he was the Dean of Stanford Law School (2004–2012). He is a scholar of constitutional law and history, conflict of laws (private international law), and civil procedure.

== Early life and education ==
Kramer was born on June 23, 1958, in Chicago, Illinois. Kramer attended Brown University, where he graduated in 1980 with a Bachelor of Arts, magna cum laude, in psychology and religious studies with membership in Phi Beta Kappa. He graduated Order of the Coif and magna cum laude from the University of Chicago Law School in 1984.

Kramer clerked for Judge Henry Friendly of the U.S. Court of Appeals for the Second Circuit (1984–85) and U.S. Supreme Court Justice William J. Brennan Jr. (1985–86).

== Academic career ==
Kramer was an assistant professor at the University of Chicago Law School from 1986 to 1990 and a professor from 1990 to 1991. He then served as a visiting professor at the University of Michigan Law School from 1990 to 1991, and as a professor there from 1991 to 1994. Kramer was a visiting professor at New York University Law School from 1993 to 1994, as well as at Harvard Law School in 1997, and at Columbia Law School in 2001. From 1994 to 2004, he was the Associate Dean for Research and Academics and the Russell D. Niles Professor at New York University Law School. From 2004 to 2012, he served as the Richard E. Lang Professor and Dean at Stanford Law School. Until joining Stanford, he served as a consultant for Mayer Brown where he worked on cases involving punitive damages, civil and criminal procedure, and individual rights.

During his tenure at Stanford, he promoted a model of legal education that transformed the traditional idea of teaching students to “think like a lawyer” to include also teaching them to “think like their clients.” He spearheaded significant reforms, including enlarging the clinical education programme and developing joint degrees as part of a multidisciplinary approach to legal studies; modifying the academic calendar, and opening a course and credit system that provided students with opportunities beyond the law school. He revamped programmes to foster a public service ethos and built out the international law programme to support a growing emphasis on globalization in legal practice. On the research side, new centers were launched in a variety of areas, including constitutional law, corporate governance, the legal profession, criminal justice, international and conflict negotiation, internet and society, law and biosciences. He also helped create CodeX, a legal technology incubator, and launched the Afghanistan Legal Education Project, in which Stanford law students developed innovative legal curricula to help a university in Afghanistan train the next generation of lawyers and leaders. Under his leadership, the project expanded to aid similar efforts in Bhutan, Iraq, Rwanda, and Timor Leste.

In July 2023, it was announced that Kramer would be the new president and vice-chancellor of the London School of Economics, beginning in April 2024. He took office on April 1, 2024.

=== Legal scholar ===
Kramer has written and taught in such varied fields as constitutional law and history, conflict of laws, civil procedure, federalism and its history, and the role of courts in society. His work helped reshaping thinking in conflict of laws, including the leading casebook in the field; federalism; and judicial review and the role of courts. He is the author of numerous books and articles, including The People Themselves: Popular Constitutionalism and Judicial Review, Reforming the Civil Justice System, Conflict of Laws: Cases-Comments-Questions, Judicial Supremacy and the End of Judicial Restraint, Madison's Audience, and Popular Constitutionalism. With respect to the role of courts, his influential book, The People Themselves: Popular Constitutionalism and Judicial Review, coined the term “popular constitutionalism” and launched an ongoing debate about the role of the people and politics in shaping constitutional law.

=== Other ===
Kramer serves on the board of directors of Equal Justice Works, a nonprofit organization that helps advance public interest law, and the ClimateWorks Foundation. Kramer is also an advisor to Ravel Law, a legal research start-up founded by two Stanford Law students while he was Dean.

Larry Kramer posted $500,000 for the bond of Samuel Bankman-Fried.

Kramer was elected to the American Law Institute (1991), the American Philosophical Society (2005), and the American Academy of Arts and Science (2006).

He has also served on the boards of numerous non-profits in a variety of fields, including: the Brennan Center for Justice, Equal Justice Works, ClimateWorks, the National Constitution Center, the Independent Sector, the Silicon Valley Community Foundation, iCivics, and the One Campaign.
