= Robert Weisberg =

American lawyer

Dean of Stanford Law School
- In office 2023-2024
- Preceded by: Jenny Martinez
- Succeeded by: Paul Brest

Personal details
- Born: New York, New York, U.S.
- Education: City College of New York (BA); Harvard University (MA, PhD); Stanford University (JD)
- Known for: Scholar of criminal law, and law and literature

Robert I. Weisberg is an American lawyer. He is the Edwin E. Huddleson Jr. Professor of Law at Stanford Law School. Weisberg is an authority on criminal law and criminal procedure, as well as a scholar in the law and literature movement.

== Education and career ==
Weisberg was educated at the Bronx High School of Science, and received his B.A. from the City College of New York in 1966. He obtained his M.A. and Ph.D. degrees in English from Harvard University in 1967 and 1971. After graduation, he taught English at Skidmore College from 1970 to 1976. Weisberg left to attend Stanford Law School, where he received a J.D. in 1979 and was the editor-in-chief of the Stanford Law Review. He then served as a law clerk for Judge J. Skelly Wright of the U.S. Court of Appeals for the District of Columbia Circuit, followed by Justice Potter Stewart of the U.S. Supreme Court during the 1980 Term.

In 1981, he joined the faculty at Stanford Law School, where he has won numerous teaching awards, served as special assistant to the provost for faculty recruitment and retention, and co-directs the Stanford Criminal Justice Center. Weisberg's book, Literary Criticisms of Law, was published in 2000, and he is widely quoted in the press on criminal law and criminal procedure. He also co-authors a criminal law casebook.

== See also ==
- List of law clerks for the eighth seat of the Supreme Court of the United States

== Selected publications ==
- Weisberg, Robert (1989). "The Law-Literature Enterprise". Yale Journal of Law & the Humanities. 1 (1).
- Weisberg, Robert (1995). "Taking Law Seriously". Yale Journal of Law & the Humanities. 7 (2).
- Weisberg, Robert (March 4, 2005). "Op-Ed: Cruel and Unusual Jurisprudence". New York Times.
- Weisberg, Robert (2012). "Book Review: Taking Law Seriously". Harvard Law Review. 125: 1425.
