= Barbara Buchner =

Austrian economist

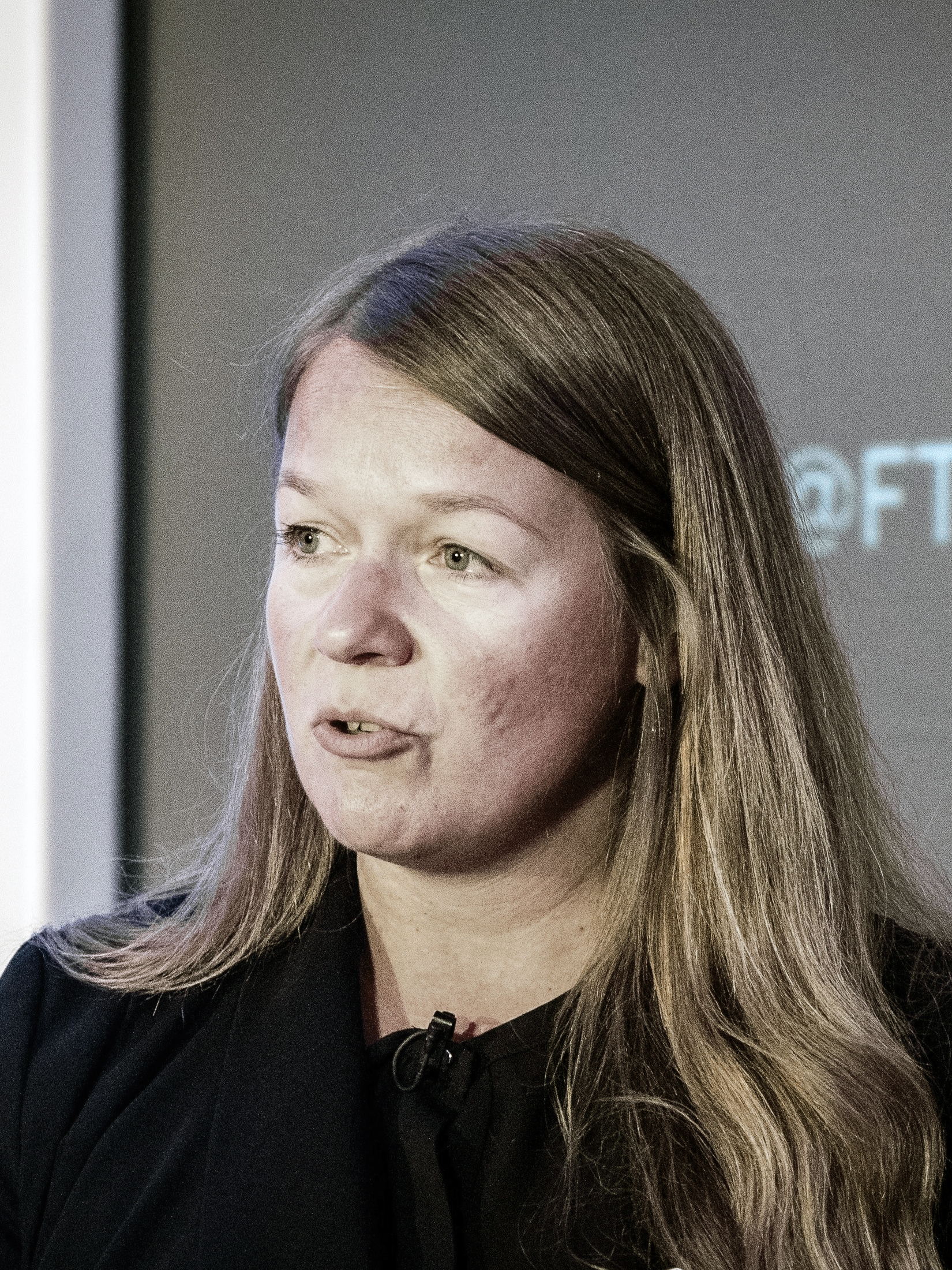
- At the FT Climate Finance Summit in London, May 2017
- Born: 17 May 1974; Austria
- Citizenship: Austrian
- Education: Graz University of Technology; University of Graz
- Scientific career
- Fields: climate change; energy; land use
- Workplaces: Climate Policy Initiative

External media

Audio
- Ep4: Barbara Buchner 'Counting the Climate Cash, Cleaning Up, August 12, 2020.

Video
- Barbara Buchner - Global Managing Director & Executive Director, Climate Policy Initiative, Local Finance Knowledge Hub, March 30, 2021

Barbara K. Buchner is an Austrian economist, with a doctorate in economics from the University of Graz. She specializes in climate finance, and is the global managing director and the executive director for the climate finance division of the Climate Policy Initiative. In 2014, the International Council for Science listed her on its Road to Paris website among twenty women influential in climate change.

== Education ==
Buchner grew up in Austria. She earned a master's degree in economics in 1999 from the economics/Environmental Sciences Joint Program run by the University of Graz and Graz University of Technology. She completed a PhD degree in economics at the University of Graz in 2003 with the dissertation Incentives in the Transition to Sustainable Structures: The Case of Climate Change Control.

== Career ==
From 2003 to 2006, Buchner worked on climate change and policy modelling as a Senior Researcher with the Fondazione Eni Enrico Mattei (FEEM). She was also a visiting scholar at Massachusetts Institute of Technology in fall 2006. In 2007, Buchner joined the International Energy Agency (IEA) where she served as a Senior Energy and Environmental Analyst.

In 2010 Buchner was appointed as the director of the Climate Policy Initiative's newly opened third office, based in Venice, Italy in the Fondazione Eni Enrico Mattei (FEEM). In 2011, she helped to establish the San Giorgio Group, a working group drawing on CPI, the World Bank Group, China Light & Power, and the OECD. The San Giorgio Group focuses on ways in which financing can support green low-emissions investment. In 2016 she became the executive director for the CPI's climate finance division.

Climate finance is considered central to the achievement of a low-carbon, climate resilient future. Through her work, Buchner has helped to establish a framework for tracking climate-relevant financial flows from a variety of sources, including both public and private flows. Among other works, Buchner has been a lead author of a series of yearly CPI reports including Global Landscape of Climate Finance (2013), which credited with setting the benchmark of climate finance tracking. She is credited with a "key part" in writing Climate Finance in 2013-14 and the USD 100 billion goal (2015), a joint report of the Organisation for Economic Co-operation and Development (OECD) and the Climate Policy Initiative (CPI), which was influential in preparations for the Paris Agreement.

In 2020, Buchner was appointed as the global managing director of the Climate Policy Initiative. Buchner directs CPI's Global Innovation Lab for Climate Finance, which was created in 2014 and has sister programs in Brazil and India. In 2021, Buchner was appointed a Professor in Practice for Sustainable Finance at SOAS University of London.

== Publications ==
Buchner has published articles in journals and in books. Her publications include:

- contributing author: Ellerman, A. Denny (2010). Pricing carbon : the European Union Emissions Trading Scheme. Cambridge: Cambridge University Press. ISBN 9781139042765.
- as co-editor: Ellerman, A.D.; Buchner, B.; Carraro, C., eds. (2007). Allocation in the European Emissions Trading Scheme: Rights, Rents, and Fairness. Cambridge: Cambridge University Press.
- as co-author: Buchner, Barbara K.; et al. Global Landscape of Climate Finance. Climate Policy Initiative. Yearly report, multiple editions.
- as co-author: OECD-CPI (2015). Climate finance in 2013-14 and the USD 100 billion goal : a report by the OECD in collaboration with Climate Policy Initiative. OECD. ISBN 9789264249424.
- as co-author: Lund, Harald Francke; et al. (2015). Background Report on Long-term Climate Finance prepared for the German G7 Presidency 2015 by CICERO and Climate Policy Initiative (PDF). Berlin: GIZ.
