= J. Larry Jameson =

American physician and university administrator

Larry Jameson

President of the University of Pennsylvania
- Incumbent
- Assumed office December 12, 2023; Acting: December 12, 2023 – March 13, 2025
- Preceded by: Liz Magill

Personal details
- Born: James Larry Jameson III Fort Benning, Georgia, U.S.
- Education: University of North Carolina, Chapel Hill (BS, MD, PhD)
- Scientific career
- Fields: Biochemistry; Endocrinology
- Workplaces: Harvard Medical School; Northwestern University; University of Pennsylvania
- Thesis: Regulation of Microtubule Assembly and Steady-State Dynamics (1981)

James Larry Jameson III is the 10th president of the University of Pennsylvania, appointed in March 13, 2025, with a term extending through June 2027. He initially assumed the role of Interim President in December 2023. Jameson also holds the title of Trustees University Professor at Penn. Prior to his presidency, from 2011 to 2023, Jameson served as Executive Vice President of the University of Pennsylvania for the Health System and Dean of the Perelman School of Medicine, where he led significant advancements in medical education, research, and patient care.

== Early life and education ==
Jameson was born on Fort Benning in Columbus, Georgia, and raised in Asheville, North Carolina.

From the University of North Carolina at Chapel Hill, Jameson received a Bachelor of Science with a major in chemistry with honors in 1976, a Doctor of Medicine in 1981, and a Ph.D. in biochemistry in 1981.

Jameson's doctoral dissertation was titled, Regulation of microtubule assembly and steady-state dynamics. During his doctoral studies at UNC, he received the Merck Book Award in 1978, the Alpha Omega Alpha membership in 1980, and the Lange Book Award in 1980. In 1981, he received the Isaac Hall Manning Award and a Merit Award from the UNC School of Medicine.

== Career ==
In 1981, Jameson started as an intern and resident at Massachusetts General Hospital in Boston. In 1983, he became a research fellow at the Howard Hughes Medical Institute's Laboratory of Molecular Endocrinology, studying transcriptional regulation in endocrine genes with a focus on nuclear hormone receptors.

In 1985, Jameson joined Harvard Medical School as an instructor in medicine, advancing to assistant professor in 1987 and associate professor by 1992. During this period, he served as chief of the Thyroid Unit at Massachusetts General Hospital from 1987 to 1993, where he co-directed training programs in endocrinology, diabetes, and reproductive biology. His research included projects on gene expression regulation and hormone receptor interactions with pituitary genes, supported by grants from the National Institute of Diabetes and Digestive and Kidney Diseases. In 1990, his contributions were recognized with election to the American Society for Clinical Investigation.

=== Northwestern University ===
In 1993, Jameson transitioned to Northwestern University's Feinberg School of Medicine as the Charles F. Kettering Professor of Medicine and chief of the Division of Endocrinology, Metabolism, and Molecular Medicine. He directed Northwestern’s Training Program in Endocrinology and Metabolism, focusing on endocrine gene transcription, thyroid disease, and pituitary tumor pathogenesis. He was elected a member of the Association of American Physicians in 1995. That same year, he began contributing as co-editor-in-chief of the textbook, Endocrinology, a reference work on clinical and molecular endocrinology.

In 2000, Jameson became chairman of the Department of Medicine at Northwestern University, overseeing a broad range of research initiatives and patient care services across multiple specialties. He directed the Hormone Action and Cancer Group at the Robert H. Lurie Comprehensive Cancer Center, continuing his research into hormone receptor action and cancer biology. In 2004, Jameson was elected as a fellow of the American Academy of Arts and Sciences and became a fellow of the American Association for the Advancement of Science in 2005. The following year, he was inducted into the National Academy of Medicine.

In 2007, Jameson was appointed dean of the Feinberg School of Medicine and vice president for medical affairs at Northwestern University. In these roles, he expanded research initiatives and emphasized molecular medicine in education. That same year, he also joined Harrison’s Principles of Internal Medicine as an editor, contributing to its 15th through 21st editions and authoring sections on endocrinology, genetics, and sex development.

=== University of Pennsylvania ===
In 2011, Jameson joined the University of Pennsylvania, serving as the executive vice president for the University of Pennsylvania Health System and Dean of the Perelman School of Medicine at the University of Pennsylvania. His responsibilities included expanding research and clinical infrastructure and directing strategic growth in medical education. His editorial roles further expanded as he became editor-in-chief of The Journal of Clinical Endocrinology and Metabolism from 2016 to 2021, and editor-in-chief of Journal of the Endocrine Society from 2016 to 2019. Since 2013, Penn Medicine researchers launched at least 55 FDA approvals, including entire new therapeutic categories.

In December 2023, Jameson was appointed interim president of the University of Pennsylvania, following the resignation of Liz Magill amid her congressional hearing controversies. In March 2025, he was elevated to President to serve until 2027.

Jameson launched Penn Forward, a strategic planning initiative to shape Penn's future focused on "building trust, catalyzing discovery and extending the reach of Penn" through initiatives like Penn San Francisco. In 2024, Penn announced a new Quaker Commitment, to expand financial aid for students designed to lower costs for middle-income families. This commitment was expanded in 2026 with a $20 million gift establishing the Mondre Family Initiative to support middle-income families. In 2024, Penn became the first Ivy League school to offer a degree in AI based in Penn Engineering. In June 2026, Jameson announced that he would conclude his presidency as scheduled on June 30, 2027. Penn subsequently began a search for its 11th president.

In August 2026, Penn announced a $520 million renovation to the David Rittenhouse Laboratory, a 7-story, 325,000 square foot project known as the Penn Discovery Commons to open by September, 2031. In June, 2026, Jameson announced a new Center for Civil Rights at Penn bringing together the Office of Equal Opportunity Programs, the Office of the Associate Vice President for Equity and Title IX, and the Office of Religious and Ethnic Interests (Title VI) under a central administrative unit.

In October, 2026, as part of the Penn Forward initiative, the university launched a new Penn Cost Calculator to make the cost of attending Penn more accessible and transparent. The same day, Penn announced a new $20 million commitment from Scott and Elena Schleifer to expand affordability at Penn.

== Personal life ==
Jameson's paternal lineage traces back to his great-great-great grandfather, William Jameson Sr., who emigrated from Ireland to colonial America in 1750. William Jameson settled in Easley, South Carolina, and served in the American Revolutionary War. For four subsequent generations, the family remained in South Carolina until Jameson's father relocated to Asheville, North Carolina, where Jameson was raised.
