= Deborah Sivas =

American environmental lawyer

Deborah A. Sivas is an American environmental lawyer currently the Luke W. Cole Professor at Stanford Law School. Her current concerns are environmental litigation, responsibility and protection.
