= List of deans of Stanford Law School =

Dean of Stanford Law School
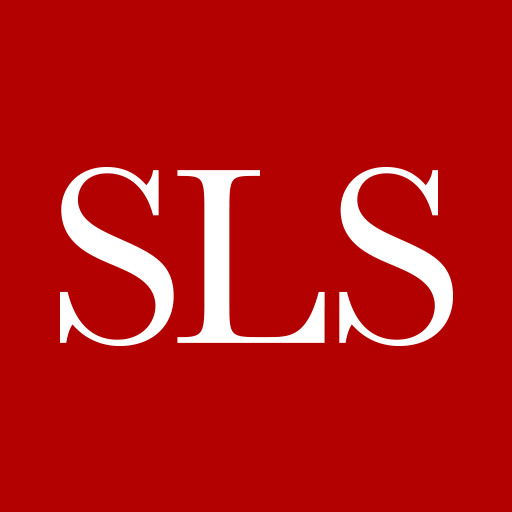
- Incumbent; George Triantis since June 17, 2024
- Seat: Stanford University
- Formation: 1910s
- First holder: Nathan Abbott (executive); Frederic C. Woodward (dean)
- Website: https://law.stanford.edu/deans-office/

The dean of Stanford Law School serves as the head of the law school at Stanford University. From 1893 until 1906, the school was headed by an executive before the deanship was established in the 1910s.

The former interim dean, Paul Brest, entered the office following the resignation of Robert Weisberg, becoming the third dean in the four month period since October 2023, when Jenny Martinez resigned to become provost of Stanford. George Triantis assumed the role of dean on June 17, 2024.

== List of executives of Stanford Law School ==
Prior to the establishment of the school's deanship, the school was run by an executive whose powers were de facto those of a dean.

No.	Picture	Name	Took office	Left office
1	Nathan Abott	Nathan Abbott	1893	1907
2		Charles Henry Huberich	1906	1906

== List of deans of Stanford Law School ==
Since the deanship was established in the 1910s, 14 people have served as dean.

No.	Picture	Name	Took office	Left office	Notes
1		Frederick C. Woodward	1908	1916	
2		Charles A. Huston	1916	1922	
3		Marion R. Kirkwood	1922	1945	
4		Carl B. Spaeth	1946	1962	
5		John R. McDonough	1962	1964	
6		Bayless A. Manning	1964	1971	
7		Thomas Ehrlich	1971	1976	
8		Charles J. Meyers	1976	1981	
9		John Hart Ely	1982	1987	
10		Paul A. Brest (pictured on left)	1987	1999	
11		Kathleen M. Sullivan	1999	2004	
12		Larry Kramer	2004	2012	
13		M. Elizabeth Magill	2012	2019	
14		Jenny S. Martinez	2019	2023	Resigned when named provost of Stanford.
15		Robert Weisberg	2023	2024	Interim. Resigned due to health issues
16		Paul A. Brest	2024	2024	Interim. Second term as dean.
17		George Triantis	2024	incumbent	Assumed duties June 17, 2024
