= Liz Magill =

American legal scholar (born 1965)

- Magill in 2023

Executive Vice President and Dean of Georgetown University Law Center
- Assuming office August 1, 2026
- Succeeding: William Treanor; Joshua C. Teitelbaum (interim)

9th President of the University of Pennsylvania
- In office July 1, 2022 – December 12, 2023
- Preceded by: Amy Gutmann
- Succeeded by: J. Larry Jameson

13th Dean of Stanford Law School
- In office 2012–2019
- Preceded by: Larry Kramer
- Succeeded by: Jennifer Martínez

Personal details
- Born: Mary Elizabeth Magill; 1966 (age 59–60) Fargo, North Dakota, U.S.
- Parent: Frank J. Magill (father)
- Education: Yale University (BA); University of Virginia (JD)

Mary Elizabeth Magill (born 1966) is an American legal scholar who has been serving as executive vice president of Georgetown University and dean of Georgetown University Law Center since August 2026.

She served as the 9th president of the University of Pennsylvania from July 2022 to December 2023, as executive vice president and provost of the University of Virginia from 2019 to 2022, and as the 13th dean of Stanford Law School from 2012 to 2019.

== Early life and education ==
A native of Fargo, North Dakota, Magill is the daughter of Frank Magill, who served as a United States federal judge on the United States Court of Appeals for the Eighth Circuit. Her brother, Frank Magill Jr., is a state judge in the Fourth Judicial District of Minnesota.

Magill received a Bachelor of Arts degree with a major in history from Yale University in 1988, where she served as the head of the Yale College Democrats. She received a Juris Doctor from the University of Virginia School of Law in 1995. During her college years from 1988 to 1992, Magill worked as a senior legislative assistant for United States Senator Kent Conrad of North Dakota.

== Career ==
=== Judicial clerkships ===
Following law school, Magill worked as a law clerk for Judge J. Harvie Wilkinson III on the United States Court of Appeals for the Fourth Circuit from 1995 to 1996. She then worked as a clerk for Justice Ruth Bader Ginsburg on the United States Supreme Court from 1996 to 1997.

=== Academia ===
In 1997, Magill joined the faculty of the University of Virginia School of Law, where she worked for 15 years. A scholar of administrative and constitutional law, she was the Joseph Weintraub–Bank of America Distinguished Professor of Law, the Elizabeth D. and Richard A. Merrill Professor, and from 2009 to 2012, the school’s vice dean.

From 2012 to 2019, Magill was dean of Stanford Law School, where she was also Richard E. Lang Professor of Law.

In 2019, she returned to the University of Virginia, where she served as provost from 2019 to 2022.

=== University of Pennsylvania ===
In July 2022, Magill took the office as the 9th president of the University of Pennsylvania. She was also appointed as a Trustees University Professor and a professor of law at the University of Pennsylvania Law School.

In September 2023, pro-Israel Jewish groups and students pushed to cancel an upcoming on-campus literature festival, Palestine Writes, alleging that scheduled speakers—including Marc Lamont Hill, Noura Erakat, Maysoon Zayid, Huwaida Arraf, Roger Waters, and Susan Abulhawa—had a "history of antisemitism," citing past statements criticizing Zionism and human rights abuses committed by Israel. Ronald Lauder, president of the World Jewish Congress, urged Magill to cancel the event. Marc Rowan, CEO of Apollo Global Management and chair of UJA-Federation of New York, a Jewish philanthropy, circulated an open letter about the event that garnered over 4,000 signatures. Members of the Penn faculty expressed concern that donors had such a "platform to criticize an event." Magill responded to the controversy, stating:

"We unequivocally—and emphatically—condemn antisemitism as antithetical to our institutional values. As a university, we also fiercely support the free exchange of ideas as central to our educational mission. This includes the expression of views that are controversial and even those that are incompatible with our institutional values."

==== 2023 congressional hearing and resignation ====
Following the October 7 Hamas-led attack on Israel and Gaza war in 2023, critics accused Magill of failing adequately to respond to antisemitism on campus. Major donors withdrew financial support for the university and called for Magill to resign. In response, in November she announced a task force and a student advisory group to combat antisemitism. The University Task Force on Antisemitism sought to better understand how antisemitism is experienced at Penn and provided feedback and solutions.

On December 5, 2023, Magill testified in front the United States House Committee on Education and Workforce, along with MIT president Sally Kornbluth and Harvard president Claudine Gay, at a hearing about antisemitism on university campuses. During the hearing, Representative Elise Stefanik characterized slogans such as "from the river to the sea" and "globalize the intifada" as "calls for genocide of Jews"; she then asked the three university presidents were asked whether calls for genocide of Jews would violate their institutions’ codes of conduct. Magill and the other presidents responded that it would be context-dependent. At one point during the hearing, Magill openly smirked. Her reply generated controversy on social media. She drew bipartisan condemnation from members of Congress, who accused her of being evasive and dissmissive of antisemitism. Magill publicly apologized the following day.

The Wharton Board of Advisors called for Magill's resignation. Stone Ridge Asset Management CEO Ross Stevens threatened to rescind shares in his holding group that had been donated to Wharton, at the time worth $100 million, if Magill did not resign.

On December 9, 2023, she announced that she would resign from the presidency, the same day that chair of the Board of Trustees Scott Bok announced his own resignation. She was succeeded by J. Larry Jameson, who was named interim president on December 12.

==== After resignation ====
Since 2022, she has served as a tenured professor of law at the University of Pennsylvania Carey Law School.

In August 2024, it was reported that Magill had been named a senior fellow at Harvard Law School. It was also reported that she would serve as a visiting professor at the London School of Economics until 2027.

=== Georgetown University ===
On February 13, 2026, Georgetown University named Magill executive vice president and dean of Georgetown University Law Center, effective August 1, 2026, succeeding interim officeholder Joshua C. Teitelbaum.

== Social engagement ==
In 2010, Magill was elected a member of the American Law Institute, when she was serving as the academic associate dean at the University of Virginia School of Law.

In 2016, she was elected a fellow of the American Academy of Arts and Sciences; she belongs to Class III, Social and Behavioral Sciences, and Section 4, Law.

In 2026, she was elected a member of the American Philosophical Society.

== See also ==
- List of law clerks for the sixth seat of the Supreme Court of the United States

Academic offices
Preceded by Amy Gutmann	President of the University of Pennsylvania; 2022–2023	Succeeded by J. Larry Jameson; Acting
