= US Congress hearings on campus antisemitism during the Gaza war =

United States Congressional hearing

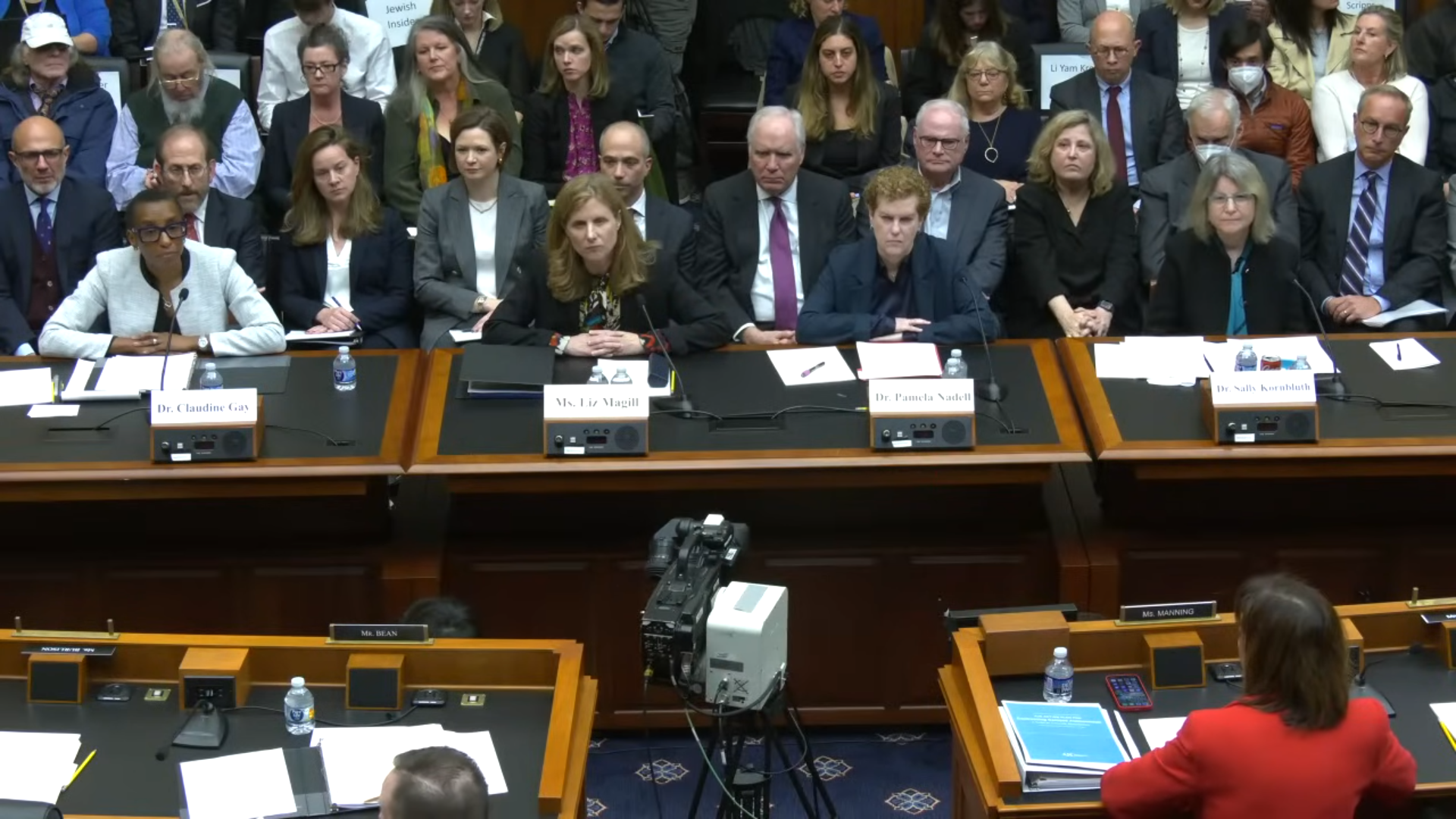
(From left to right) Claudine Gay, Elizabeth Magill, Pamela Nadell, and Sally Kornbluth at a 2023 US Congress Hearing on Antisemitism.

The US House of Representatives' Committee on Education and Workforce held a series of congressional hearings beginning in late 2023 examining antisemitism at American universities following the outbreak of the Gaza war. The hearings focused on university responses to campus protests against the Gaza war, speech, and allegations of discrimination.

The hearings drew national attention after testimony from university leaders, including the presidents of Harvard University, the University of Pennsylvania, and the Massachusetts Institute of Technology. The proceedings received extensive media coverage and political attention. Several university administrators faced criticism over their responses to antisemitism and campus protests, and the hearings were followed by high-profile resignations and congressional investigations. However, some institutions expressed support for their administrations.

The hearings were politically contentious. Supporters argued that they addressed failures by universities to protect Jewish students and enforce civil rights obligations. Critics characterized the hearings as politically motivated and raised concerns that congressional pressure could chill protected speech on campus. Some critics placed the hearing within the context of the second Trump administration's education policy, which the UCLA Law Review characterized as an authoritarian "assault on higher education". Other critics also argued that Congress had given disproportionate attention to antisemitism compared with anti-Palestinian racism, Islamophobia, and other forms of discrimination on campus.

== Background ==
=== Antisemitism in US higher education ===
==== Reinterpretation of Title VI ====
In 2004, attorney Kenneth L. Marcus, while working at the Office for Civil Rights of the US Department of Education, authored a reinterpretation of Title VI of the Civil Rights Act of 1964, which had been established to protect against racial discrimination in Jim Crow laws affecting education. Marcus's reinterpretation included protections against religious discrimination, particularly "when based on shared ancestry or ethnic characteristics" as a proxy for the interpretation of 'race' in earlier jurisprudence.

=== Gaza war protests ===
The Gaza war and genocide prompted widespread protests on university campuses in the United States, including both pro-Palestinian and pro-Israeli demonstrations. Some protests and related incidents drew allegations of antisemitism and Islamophobia.

Universities faced criticism from lawmakers, donors, and members of the public over their responses to the attacks and subsequent campus protests. Some critics argued that universities failed to adequately condemn the Hamas attacks or respond to alleged antisemitic rhetoric, including at institutions such as Harvard University and the University of Pennsylvania.

The issue became a subject of political debate in the United States. Some commentators described criticism of universities as part of broader conservative attacks on higher education, while others argued that universities had failed to address antisemitism on campus. Amid growing political pressure and public controversy over campus protests and antisemitism, U.S. lawmakers initiated a series of congressional hearings to examine universities’ responses.

== Hearings ==
In December 2023, the House Committee on Education and the Workforce held the first in a series of congressional hearings examining antisemitism at U.S. universities and institutional responses to campus protests following the Israel–Hamas war. The hearings focused on university policies regarding speech, disciplinary actions, and the handling of alleged discrimination.

=== December 2023 hearing ===
On December 5, 2023, the House Committee on Education and the Workforce held a hearing featuring Claudine Gay of Harvard University, Liz Magill of the University of Pennsylvania, and Sally Kornbluth of the Massachusetts Institute of Technology. The three presidents were joined by Pamela Nadell, a professor of history at American University. Lawmakers questioned the university leaders about campus protests, institutional policies, and responses to alleged antisemitic incidents.

During the hearing, Representative Elise Stefanik characterized slogans such as "from the river to the sea" and "globalize the intifada" as calls for genocide of Jews. She asked the university presidents whether these slogans would violate their institutions’ codes of conduct. The presidents responded that such determinations would depend on context. The exchange received widespread media coverage and became a focal point of public criticism.

The testimony prompted criticism from lawmakers, university donors, and members of the public. Some critics argued that the responses demonstrated a failure to adequately address antisemitism on campus, while others warned that political pressure could undermine principles of free expression at universities.

The hearing was followed by significant public and political backlash, including calls for the resignation of several university leaders.

==== Leadership changes ====
Liz Magill, who had already faced criticism over the University of Pennsylvania's initial response to the October 7 attacks, resigned as president four days after the hearing.

In December 2023, allegations of plagiarism against Claudine Gay were publicized by conservative activists and media outlets, and the House committee subsequently announced that it would examine the allegations as part of its broader inquiry.

Gay resigned as president of Harvard University on January 2, 2024.

The resignations were widely covered in national media and interpreted in differing ways. Some commentators described them as reflecting political pressure on universities, while others viewed them as accountability for institutional responses to antisemitism on campus.

=== April 2024 hearing: "Columbia in Crisis: Columbia University’s Response to Antisemitism" ===
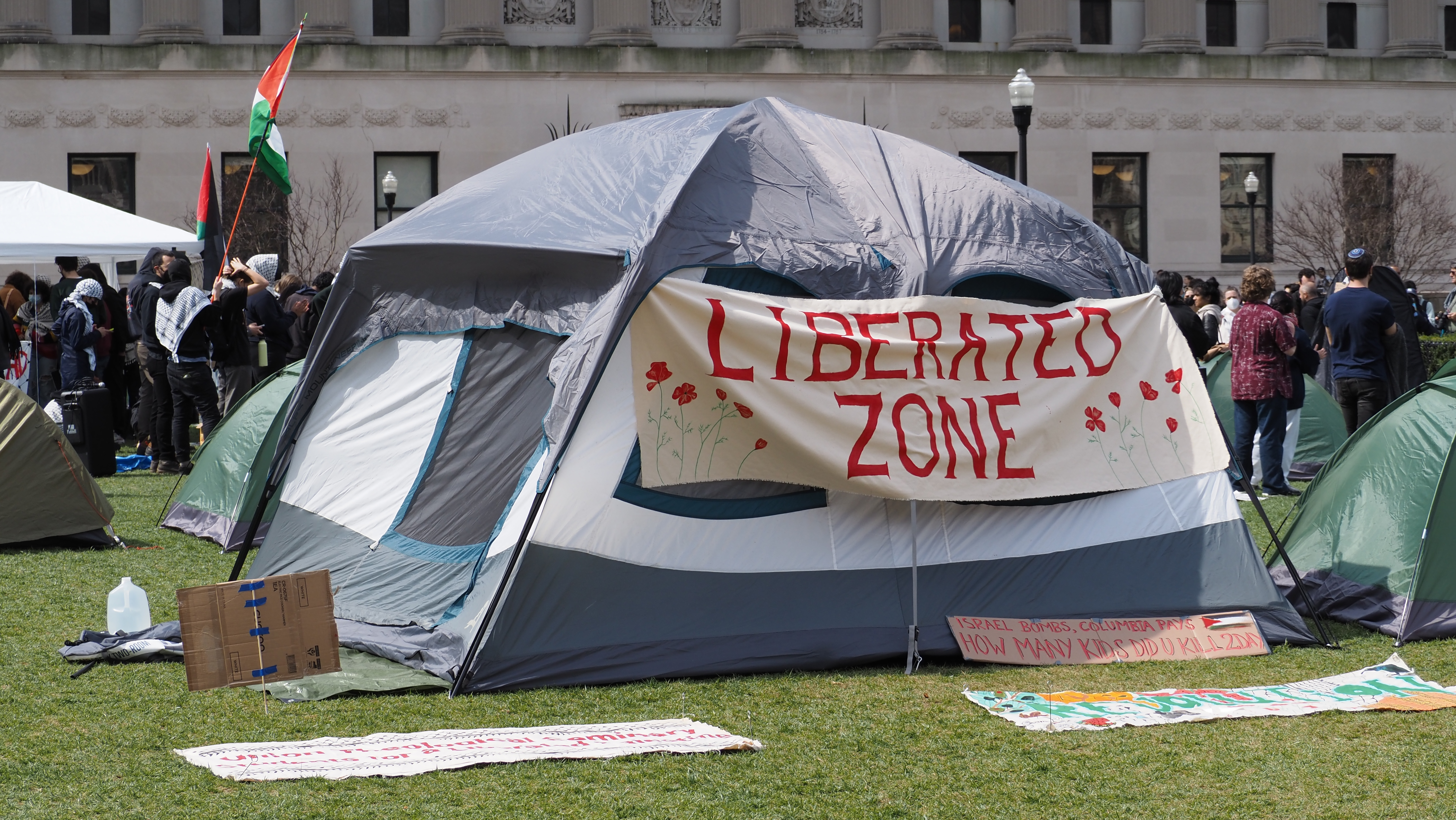
Students established the Gaza Solidarity Encampment at Columbia University hours before Shafik, Shipman, Greenwald, and Schizer testified before Congress.

Columbia University president Minouche Shafik had previously been invited to testify at the November 2023 congressional hearing on campus antisemitism, but declined, citing a scheduling conflict.

On April 17, 2024, the House Committee on Education and the Workforce held a hearing titled "Columbia in Crisis: Columbia University's Response to Antisemitism". Shafik testified alongside Columbia board of trustees co-chairs Claire Shipman and David Greenwald, and David Schizer, co-chair of Columbia's Task Force on Antisemitism. The hearing took place hours after students established the Gaza Solidarity Encampment on Columbia's campus in New York City.

During the hearing, lawmakers questioned Shafik and other Columbia officials about the university's response to allegations of antisemitism, campus protests, and disciplinary actions. According to The New York Times, Shafik monitored the campus protests that morning from a makeshift headquarters at the offices of Covington & Burling, a law firm near the White House.

A number of exchanges during the hearing drew attention. Rep. Elise Stefanik questioned Shafik about Columbia faculty members accused of making antisemitic statements, including professor Joseph Massad, and pressed her on whether disciplinary action had been taken. Rep. Rick W. Allen asked Shafik whether she was familiar with Genesis 12:3 and whether she wanted Columbia University to be "cursed by God". Rep. Jim Banks asked Shafik to explain terms which appeared in a student pamphlet including "ashkenormativity" and "folx", while Rep. Haley Stevens cited the Anti-Defamation League's "D" grade for Columbia in its campus antisemitism report card.

=== Later hearings ===
On May 7, 2025, the committee held a hearing titled "Beyond the Ivy League: Stopping the Spread of Antisemitism on American Campuses", featuring California Polytechnic State University, San Luis Obispo president Jeffrey D. Armstrong, DePaul University president Robert L. Manuel, and Haverford College president Wendy Raymond. Inside Higher Ed reported that the hearing broadened the committee's scrutiny beyond Ivy League institutions and that the presidents largely avoided the missteps that had marked earlier hearings.

On July 15, 2025, the committee held a hearing titled "Antisemitism in Higher Education: Examining the Role of Faculty, Funding, and Ideology". Witnesses included Georgetown University interim president Robert Groves, City University of New York chancellor Félix V. Matos Rodríguez, and University of California, Berkeley chancellor Rich Lyons. Republicans questioned the university leaders about antisemitism complaints, faculty speech, foreign funding, and campus ideology, while Democrats criticized the Trump administration's approach to higher education.

== Outcomes ==
=== Investigations and subpoenas ===
Following the December 2023 hearing, several members of Congress, including Rep. Elise Stefanik, called for the resignation of the university presidents who had testified. A letter signed by dozens of lawmakers later reiterated those demands.

On December 7, 2023, the House Committee on Education and the Workforce announced a formal congressional investigation into Harvard University, the University of Pennsylvania, and the Massachusetts Institute of Technology, stating that it would proceed "with the full force of subpoena power".

The testimony by the university presidents drew widespread criticism from lawmakers, donors, and members of the public. University officials and public figures offered differing interpretations of the exchange. Claudine Gay stated that Harvard would not condone calls for violence while emphasizing the importance of free expression. Public officials, including Pennsylvania governor Josh Shapiro, described some of the responses as unacceptable, while free speech advocates argued that the presidents' answers reflected established First Amendment principles.

=== Subsequent institutional actions ===
Several universities took or announced institutional actions after the hearings and related investigations. At Penn, interim president J. Larry Jameson released final reports from the University Task Force on Antisemitism and the Presidential Commission on Countering Hate and Building Community in May 2024; the antisemitism task force recommended reviewing university policies on expression and conduct to ensure they were clear, consistent, transparent, and equitably applied.

Harvard convened task forces on antisemitism and anti-Israeli bias and on anti-Muslim, anti-Arab, and anti-Palestinian bias. In April 2025, Harvard announced new initiatives following the release of the task forces' final reports, including changes related to admissions, curriculum, orientation, and campus life.

At Columbia, the university announced policy changes in March 2025 under pressure from the Trump administration, including changes to protest rules and a review of Middle Eastern studies programs. In July 2025, Columbia agreed to a settlement with the federal government involving US$200 million to resolve federal claims related to antisemitism, along with a $21 million claims fund for Jewish employees who reported experiencing antisemitism.

== Criticism ==
Critics argued that the hearings gave exclusive attention to antisemitism while not examining other forms of discrimination on college campuses, including anti-Palestinian racism and Islamophobia.

A 2024 essay in the UCLA Law Review placed the hearing within the context of an authoritarian attack on education, describing it as an attempt to "erode academic freedom and university independence," in which "House GOP leadership—among other elected officials—marshal cynical antisemitism talking points to smear individual academics and discredit higher education writ large."

Rep. Bobby Scott, the ranking Democrat on the House Committee on Education and the Workforce, said that the July 2025 hearing was the committee's ninth hearing on antisemitism in 18 months, but that the committee had not held a single hearing on "racism, xenophobia, sexism, Islamophobia or other challenges affecting other student groups on American college campuses". Scott and other Democrats also criticized the Trump administration's approach to civil rights enforcement in education.

== In popular culture ==
The hearing was portrayed in the cold open of the December 9 episode of Saturday Night Live Season 49, in which Chloe Troast played Stefanik. It was also satirized in an episode of the Israeli comedy show Eretz Nehederet, with a guest appearance from American comedian and pro-Israel advocate Michael Rapaport.

== See also ==
- Universities and antisemitism
- Antisemitism in US higher education
