= Nathan Abbott =

Lawyer, law teacher

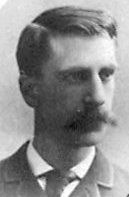

1st Executive of Stanford Law School
- In office 1895–1907
- Succeeded by: Charles Huberich

Personal details
- Born: July 11, 1854 Norridgewock, Maine, US
- Died: January 4, 1941 (aged 86)
- Spouse: Frances Abbott (née Field) (m. 1884; died 1924)
- Children: 2
- Parent(s): Abdiel Abbott; Sarah Smith Abbott (née Davis)
- Education: Yale College (BA); Boston University School of Law (LLB)

Nathan D. Abbott (11 July 1854 – 4 January 1941) was an American lawyer from the U.S. state of Maine. He was the co-founder of Stanford Law School, where he also served as its first dean.

== Personal life and education ==
Abbott was born in Norridgewock, Maine, the son of Abiel Abbott and Sarah Smith Abbott on 11 July 1854. He studied in Norridgewock public schools until the age of 16. That year, in 1870, he moved to Andover, Massachusetts to study at Phillips Academy. After three years there, in 1873 he was admitted to Yale College, from which he graduated with a Bachelor of Arts in 1877. At Yale, he was a member of Scroll and Key secret society and Psi Upsilon fraternity.

His legal education consisted of a mixture of reading law at his father's practice in Boston as well as attending Boston University School of Law. He graduated from the latter in 1883 with a Bachelor of Laws (LL.B.). On April 23, 1884 he married Frances Field.

== Career ==
Abbott practiced law in Boston for about seven years, until 1891, when he accepted a position to teach law at the University of Michigan, but he held that position for only one year when he resigned to accept a professorship of law in Northwestern University.

After teaching at Northwestern for just two years, in 1895 Abbott was asked to form a Department of Law at Stanford University by its then-President, David Starr Jordan. Upon his arrival, Stanford was suffering widespread financial cuts and layoffs as a result of a dispute over the finances of Leland Stanford's estate as well as the economic fallout from the Panic of 1893. Abbott was forced to perform a wide array of unusual duties to begin work on his new law school, including building furniture for the school himself. The law school grew quickly during its formative years, reaching 100 students by the turn of the millennium. The department was also unique in that it accepted students regardless of race or gender; Abbott accepted students who were Hispanic, Chinese, Japanese, and female.

Abbott was a personal friend to famous philosopher William James, who was visiting in Abbott's home during the 1906 San Francisco earthquake.

He led Stanford Law School until 1907, after which time he was a member of the law faculty of Columbia University, New York City. He was a legal scholar of wide reputation and a recognized authority on the English and American Law of Real Property.

Abbott retired in 1922 around the age of 68. He died in 1941 due to complications from pyelonephritis.
