= Kathleen Sullivan (lawyer) =

American lawyer (born 1955)

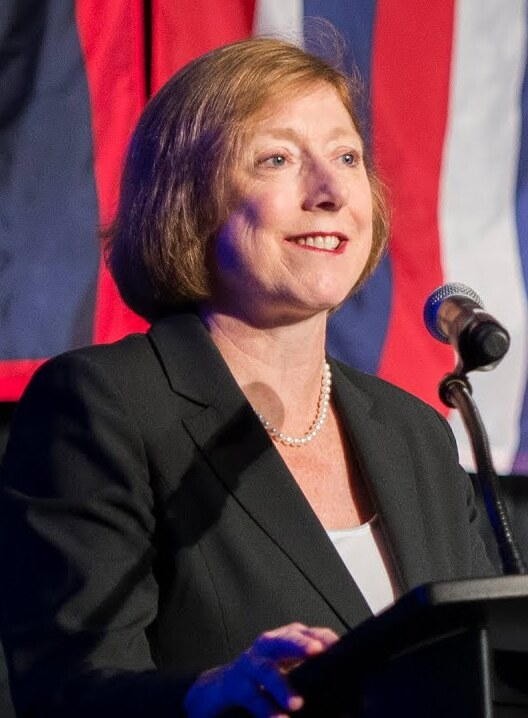
- Sullivan in 2014

11th Dean of Stanford Law School
- In office 1999–2004
- Preceded by: Paul Brest
- Succeeded by: Larry Kramer

Personal details
- Born: August 20, 1955 (age 71) Sault Ste. Marie, Michigan, U.S.
- Education: Cornell University (BA); Wadham College, Oxford (MA); Harvard University (JD)

Kathleen Marie Sullivan (born August 20, 1955) is an American lawyer and former senior counsel at Quinn Emanuel Urquhart & Sullivan, a global, litigation-only law firm headquartered in Los Angeles, California. Based in the firm's New York City office, Sullivan chaired its national appellate practice group until her retirement in 2025. She was the first and only female name partner at an Am Law 100 law firm. Previously, Sullivan served as dean of Stanford Law School, where she was the Stanley Morrison Professor of Law.

== Early life and education ==
Born in Sault Sainte Marie, Michigan, and raised on Long Island, New York, Sullivan graduated from Cold Spring Harbor High School in 1972. She participated in the Telluride Association Summer Program during high school, then attended Cornell University, where she was a member of the Telluride House, and graduated in 1976. She then became a Marshall Scholar at Wadham College, Oxford, and graduated in 1978 with a degree in philosophy, politics and economics.

Sullivan returned to the United States to attend Harvard Law School. Professor Laurence Tribe called her, at the time, "the most extraordinary student I had ever had." During law school, Sullivan worked as a research assistant to Tribe and assisted him with his Supreme Court appeals. After graduating from Harvard Law School in 1981, Sullivan served one year as a judicial law clerk to Judge James L. Oakes on the U.S. Court of Appeals for the Second Circuit. Following her clerkship, Sullivan elected against joining a large law firm, and instead returned to Cambridge, Massachusetts, as a litigation associate in Tribe's private appellate practice.

== Career ==
Although several major law schools offered her positions, Sullivan accepted an assistant professorship at Harvard in 1984, and was promoted to professor of law in 1989. Following a visiting teaching position at Stanford Law School in spring 1992, Sullivan accepted an offer to join that faculty in 1993 and was promoted to the Stanley Morrison Professor of Law in 1996. Sullivan served as Dean of Stanford Law School from 1999 to 2004, becoming the first woman to head any of Stanford's seven schools and the first woman Dean at one of the nation's top three law schools. After voluntarily stepping down as Dean in 2004 to serve part-time as the inaugural director of the Stanford Constitutional Law Center, Sullivan remained on Stanford Law's faculty until 2012. Stanford recruited New York University Law School assistant dean and legal scholar Larry Kramer to succeed her as Dean, as well as serve as Richard E. Lang Professor at the Law School.

Sullivan specializes in constitutional law and co-edited a leading casebook with the late Stanford Law professor Gerald Gunther, Constitutional Law, through its 17th edition. She has co-edited the 18th and 19th editions with Noah Feldman. From 2000 to 2007, Sullivan was the sixth most-cited constitutional law scholar, and the most-cited female legal scholar between 2005 and 2009. She is an elected fellow of the American Academy of Arts and Sciences and a member of the American Philosophical Society.

=== Appellate advocate ===
While Stanford's Dean, Sullivan maintained a pro bono constitutional law practice. In 2005, she joined Quinn Emanuel Urquhart Oliver & Hedges (now Quinn Emanuel Urquhart & Sullivan), where she helped to found and build the firm's nascent appellate practice. As chair of the firm's national appellate practice, Sullivan argued and briefed numerous appeals before the U.S. Courts of Appeals, the California Supreme Court, the New York Court of Appeals, and the U.S. Supreme Court, where she has argued eleven times. Cases she won before the U.S. Supreme Court include: Bruesewitz v. Wyeth, Kiobel v. Royal Dutch Petroleum Co., and Granholm v. Heald (which struck down state prohibition of interstate wine shipping). She also represented Shell Oil in an appeal to limit the company's liability for toxic waste. Sullivan has also filed pro bono briefs in a wide range of civil rights cases, and served as co-counsel for Michael Hardwick in the 1986 landmark gay rights case Bowers v. Hardwick.

In both 2006 and 2013, The National Law Journal recognized Sullivan as one of America's 100 most influential lawyers.

In late 2016, Sullivan argued on behalf of Samsung Electronics in Apple Inc. v. Samsung Electronics Co. in front of the Supreme Court and it ruled in favor of Samsung to reverse the decision and remanded it to Federal Circuit court to define the appropriate legal standard to define "article of manufacture".

Sullivan, a member of the New York bar since 1982 and the Massachusetts bar since 1988, failed the July 2005 California bar exam, which The Wall Street Journal viewed as illustrating preexisting criticisms about the way the test is administered and graded. She retook the exam in February 2006 and passed.

== Books ==
- New Federalist Papers: Essays in Defense of the Constitution, with Alan Brinkley and Nelson W. Polsby, 1997

== See also ==
- Barack Obama Supreme Court candidates

Academic offices
Preceded by Paul Brest	Dean of Stanford Law School; 1999–2004	Succeeded by Larry Kramer
