= Political process theory (law) =

Theory of judicial interpretation

Political process theory is a theory of judicial interpretation championed by American legal scholar John Hart Ely, which argues that judges should focus on maintaining a well-functioning democratic process and guard against systematic biases in the legislative process.

== Definition ==
Political process theory advocates believe that the best approach of constitutional interpretation is one of representation reinforcement, i.e. improving the democratic process. Proponents believe that judges who reinforce representation play the best normative role.^{101-04} The argument also states that the judicial approach is implicit in the Framers' design.^{88-101}

Ely praised the process theory principle, which was thought to have been first expounded in footnote four of the United States Supreme Court case Carolene Products that affirmed the constitutionality of a regulation on filled-milk product. Justice Harlan Stone, in addition, described circumstances where the ordinary presumption of a law's constitutionality may not apply and heightened judicial scrutiny may be triggered, including if a law:

1. Appears on its face to be within a specific prohibition of the Constitution, such as those of the first ten amendments, which are deemed equally specific when held to be embraced within the Fourteenth.
2. restricts "political processes which can ordinarily be expected to bring about repeal of undesirable legislation," or
3. involves "prejudice against discrete and insular minorities... which tends seriously to curtail the operation of those political processes ordinarily to be relied upon to protect minorities."

Troubled by the counter-majoritarian difficulty of judges overruling democratic majorities, Ely prefers that judges not needlessly intervene in controversial normative debates. He instead proposes the principle of representation reinforcement, a neutral principle to have judges more aggressively guard the democratic process. On the issue of political processes, Justice Stone cited cases involving restrictions on the right to vote, restraints upon the dissemination of information, interferences with political organizations, and prohibition of peaceable assembly. Ely further argues that the Warren court's jurisprudence and its defense of individual rights generally implicitly conformed to the principle set out in footnote four.

Ely's book Democracy and Distrust (1980) was widely regarded as the most important academic work for two generations on American constitutional law, and was the most cited piece legal scholarship from 1978 to 2000. It has also been defended by legal scholar Michael Klarman.

== See also ==
- John Hart Ely
- Judicial interpretation
