= Thomas Heller =

Climate policy lawyer and academic

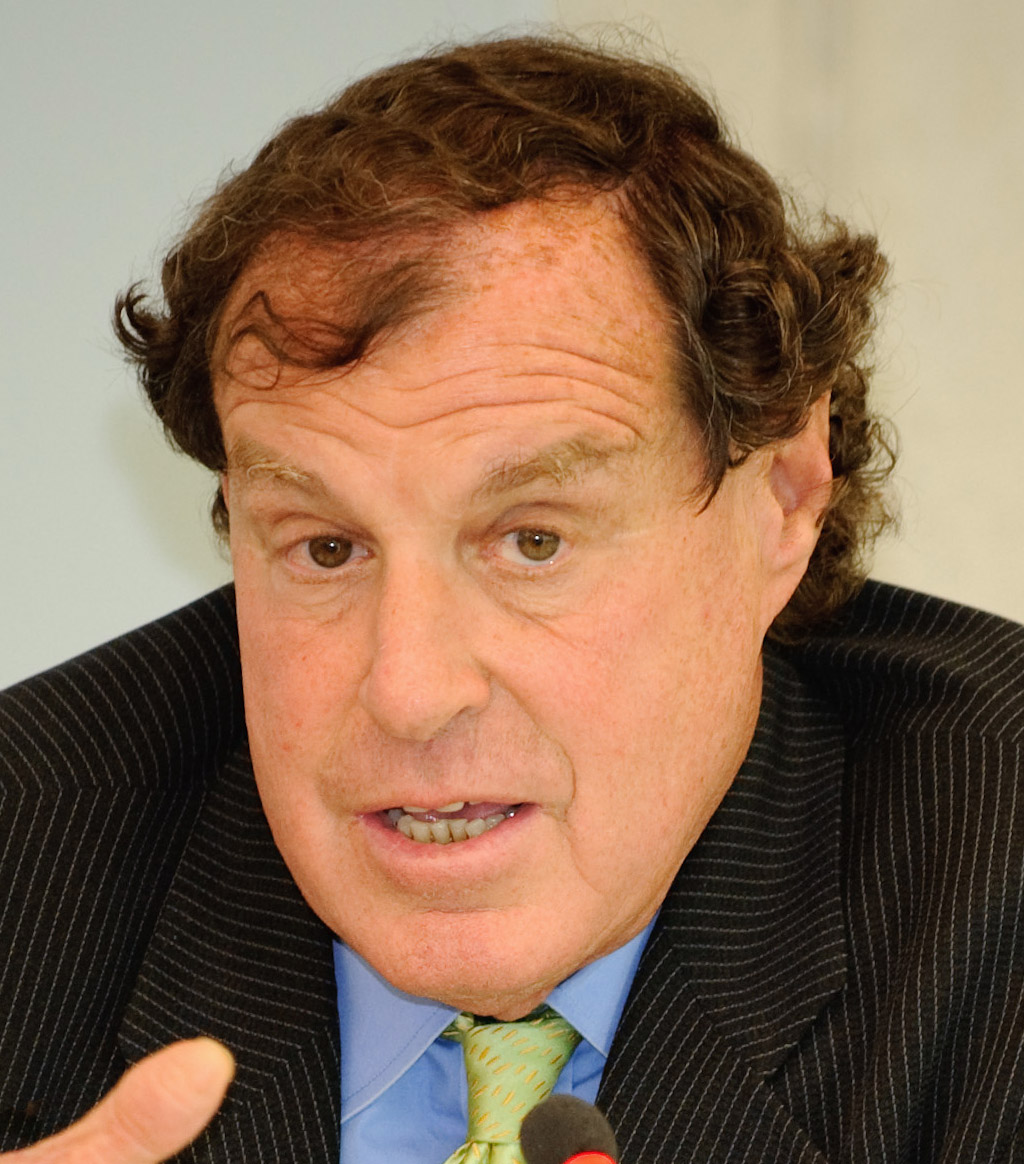
- Born: February 27, 1944 (age 82)
- Education: Princeton University; Yale Law School
- Scientific career
- Fields: Global warming Energy policy Green growth
- Workplaces: Climate Policy Initiative

Thomas C. Heller (born February 27, 1944) is a climate policy lawyer and academic. He currently serves as the chairman of the board for Climate Policy Initiative, an organization he founded in 2009 that works to improve energy and land use policies, with offices and programs in Brazil, China, Europe, India, and Indonesia, and the United States.

== Biography ==
An expert in law, economic development, and the performance of legal institutions, Thomas Heller's work has focused on policy effectiveness, international climate control, global energy use, green growth, and the interaction of government and nongovernmental organizations in establishing legal structures in the developing world. Since 1991, Heller has been increasingly engaged in research and applied policy studies in energy and climate, with a principal concern with developments in China, India, Mexico, Brazil and other leading emerging markets.

From September 2009 through March 2016, Heller served as executive director of Climate Policy Initiative (CPI), a policy effectiveness analysis and advisory organization that evaluates and supports the efforts of nations to achieve low-carbon growth. He was also a coordinating lead author for the IPCC's Third and Fourth Assessment Reports and a contributor to the Special Reports on Technology Transfer and Emissions Scenarios. The work of the IPCC (including the contributions of many scientists) was recognised by the joint award of the 2007 Nobel Peace Prize. Heller also served as a core team member directing Project Catalyst—an analysis-based project in support of the Copenhagen Climate Process—and currently serves as vice-chair of the governing board of the Global Green Growth Institute, with headquarters in Seoul, Korea.

Heller received his B.A. in economics from Princeton University in 1965 and his LL.B. from Yale Law School in 1968. From 1968 to 1971, he worked as an attorney-advisor for the governments of Chile and Argentina. Upon returning from South America, Heller served as a professor of law at the University of Wisconsin Law School before joining the Stanford Law School Faculty in 1978, where he remained until 2009. There he served as the Lewis Talbot and Nadine Hearn Shelton Professor of International Legal Studies (now emeritus) and was also a senior fellow at the Stanford Freeman Spogli Institute for International Studies and at the Woods Institute for the Environment.

== Works ==
- Heller, Thomas; Seiger, Alicia (21 October 2021). Settling Climate Accounts: Navigating the Road to Net Zero. Springer Nature. ISBN 978-3-030-83650-4.
- Heller, Thomas (2017). "Finance, Growth and Sustainable Infrastructure: The Shifting Logic of Climate Change". In Madsbjerg, Saadia; Keohane, Georgia Levenson (eds.). The Innovative Finance Revolution: Private Capital for the Public Good (PDF). Foreign Affairs. pp. 109–116.
- Nicholas Bloom, Benn Eifert, Thomas C. Heller, Erik Jensen, and Aprajit Mahajan, Contract Enforcement and Firm Organization: Evidence from the Indian Textile Industry, CDDRL Working Papers, 2009.
- Thomas C. Heller, "Afterword: Reflections on a Path to Effective Climate Change Mitigation," in Climate Finance: Regulatory and Funding Strategies for Climate Change and Global Development, Richard B. Stewart, Benedict Kingsbury, Bryce Rudyk, eds., New York: New York University Press, 2009.
- Thomas C. Heller and David G. Victor, Political Economy of Power Sector Reform: The Experiences of Five Major Developing Countries, Cambridge, United Kingdom: Cambridge University Press, 2007.
- Thomas C. Heller, "Diversifier la Production Electrique en Chine", in Regards Sur la Terre 2007, Pierre Jacquet and Laurence Tubiana, eds., Paris: Les Presses Sciences Po, 2007.
- Thomas C. Heller and Erik G. Jensen, editors, Beyond Common Knowledge: Empirical Approaches to the Rule of Law, Stanford, CA: Stanford University Press, 2003.
- Intergovernmental Panel on Climate Change. 2001. IPCC Third Assessment Report: Climate Change 2001. Cambridge University Press. (Contributing lead author, “Summary for Policymakers”)
- Intergovernmental Panel on Climate Change 2007. IPCC Fourth Assessment Report: Climate Change 2007. Cambridge University Press. (Contributing lead author)
