= Jenny Martinez =

American lawyer and academic (born 1971)

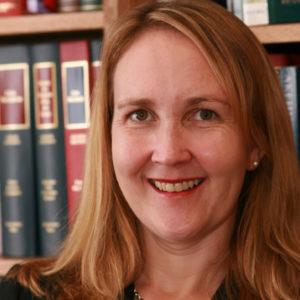

14th Provost of Stanford University
- Incumbent
- Assumed office October 1, 2023
- Preceded by: Persis Drell

Dean of Stanford Law School
- In office April 2019 – September 2023
- Preceded by: M. Elizabeth Magill
- Succeeded by: Robert Weisberg (interim)

Personal details
- Born: November 5, 1971 (age 54) San Francisco, California, U.S.
- Education: Yale University (BA); Harvard University (JD)

Jenny S. Martinez (born November 5, 1971) is an American legal scholar and academic who is the 14th and current provost of Stanford University. Stanford University President Richard Saller named her to the position in August 2023, effective October 1, 2023. Martinez succeeded Persis Drell, who announced in May that she would step down as provost.

From April 2019 to September 2023, she served as the Dean of Stanford Law School. She joined the Stanford faculty in 2003, and has taught courses on constitutional law, international law, and human rights. She is an authority on international law and constitutional law, including comparative constitutional law. She is the author of The Slave Trade, The Origins of International Human Rights Law (Oxford University Press, 2012).

== Education and legal career ==
Martinez graduated cum laude with distinction from Yale University and magna cum laude from Harvard Law School. During her first year in law school, she was awarded the Sears Prize, which goes to the two students with the highest first year grades. She served as managing editor of the Harvard Law Review and was twice published in the law review. After law school, she clerked for Justice Stephen Breyer, Judge Patricia Wald of the United Nations International Criminal Tribunal for the former Yugoslavia, and Judge Guido Calabresi of the United States Court of Appeals for the Second Circuit.

She joined Stanford Law School's faculty in 2003, after working as an attorney at the law firm Jenner & Block in Washington, D.C., and as a senior research fellow and visiting lecturer at Yale University. She has twice been named one of the "100 Most Influential Hispanics" and an "Elite Woman" by Hispanic Business magazine." She also was named to the National Law Journal's list of "Top 40 Lawyers Under 40" and the American Lawyer's "Young Litigators Fab Fifty." She also has received the Civil Rights Advocacy Award from the La Raza Lawyers of San Francisco and the Ray of Hope Award from Hispanas Organized for Political Equality (HOPE). When asked to cite the best U.S. Supreme Court decision since 1960 by Time, she cited New York Times Co. v. U.S. (1971). She has pointed to the Japanese internment case, Korematsu v. U.S. (1944), as among the worst opinions. Martinez represented José Padilla in the Supreme Court in Rumsfeld v. Padilla.

She is a member of the American Law Institute and the American Academy of Arts and Sciences.

== Publications ==
- Martinez, Jenny S. (2012). The Slave Trade and the Origins of International Human Rights Law. New York: Oxford University Press. ISBN 978-0-19-539162-6.
- —— (2011). "International Courts and the U.S. Constitution: Re-examining the History". University of Pennsylvania Law Review. 159 (4): 1069–1140. JSTOR 41149893.
- —— (2008). "Process and Substance in the 'War on Terror'". Columbia Law Review. 108 (5): 1013–1092. JSTOR 40041795.
- —— (2006). "Inherent Executive Power: A Comparative Perspective". The Yale Law Journal. 115 (9): 2480–2511. doi:10.2307/20455703. JSTOR 20455703.

== Personal life ==
In 2004, Martinez married David Silliman Graham. They have three daughters, four chickens, two cats and a dog.

== See also ==
- List of law clerks for the second seat of the Supreme Court of the United States
