= Paul Brest =

American legal scholar (born c. 1940)

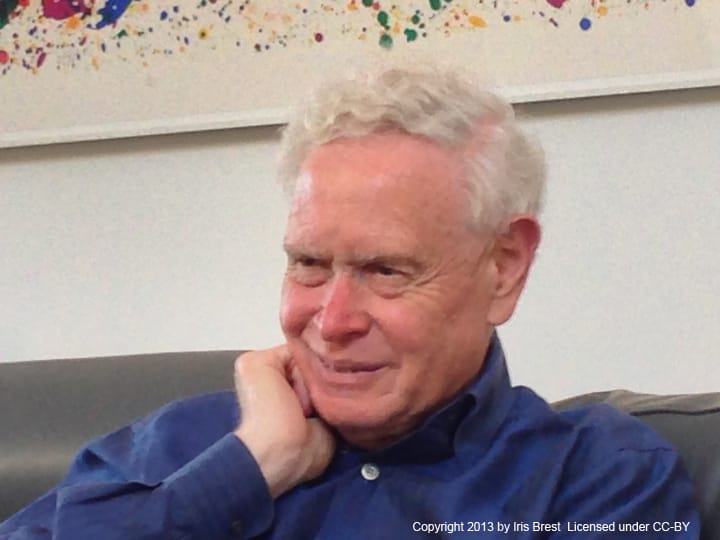

Dean of Stanford Law School
- In office 1987–1999
- Preceded by: John Hart Ely
- Succeeded by: Kathleen M. Sullivan

President of the William and Flora Hewlett Foundation
- In office January 2000 – 2012
- Preceded by: David P. Gardner
- Succeeded by: Larry Kramer

Personal details
- Born: 1940 (age 85–86)
- Spouse: Iris Brest
- Education: Swarthmore College (BA); Harvard University (LLB)

Paul Brest (born 1940) is an American legal scholar. He is a professor emeritus at Stanford Law School, where he served as dean from 1987 to 1999. After retiring as dean, he became president of the William and Flora Hewlett Foundation from 2000-2012, and then returned to Stanford, where he currently teaches. Brest is recognized for his work in constitutional law, philanthropy, impact investing, and nonprofit strategy.

== Family ==
Brest is the son of Alexander Brest, a civil engineer, and Mia Glazer, who involuntarily emigrated from Vienna, Austria in 1938. His brother Peter is retired from a career managing social welfare organizations.

He has been married to Iris Lang Brest, whom he met at Swarthmore College, since 1962. They have two children: Hilary Meltzer, Chief of the Environmental Law Division of the New York City Law Department, and Jeremy Brest, a corporate finance executive. They have five grandchildren.

== Education and early career ==
Brest received his Bachelor of Arts degree from Swarthmore College in 1962 and his Bachelor of Laws from Harvard Law School in 1965.

Following law school, Brest clerked for Judge Bailey Aldrich of the Court of Appeals for the First Circuit and for Justice John Marshall Harlan II of the Supreme Court of the United States. He also practiced as a civil rights litigator with the NAACP Legal Defense and Education Fund in Mississippi.

== Professional career ==
Brest joined the faculty of Stanford Law School in 1969. He was a visiting professor at Yale Law School for the 1977-78 academic year, and a fellow at the Center for Advanced Study in the Behavioral Sciences during the 1983-84 academic year. He served as Dean of Stanford Law School from 1987 until 1999. After a brief sabbatical, he became president of the Hewlett Foundation.

Brest returned to Stanford Law School in 2012. He is the faculty co-director of the Effective Philanthropy Learning Initiative at the Stanford Center on Philanthropy and Civil Society, and a lecturer at the Stanford Graduate School of Business.

In addition to graduate-level courses on philanthropy, nonprofit strategy, impact investing, and academic freedom, he teaches two undergraduate courses: Democracy and Disagreement (together with Debra Satz, Dean of the School of Humanities and Sciences) and Citizenship in the 21st Century, a freshman course. He also directs numerous policy practicums through the Stanford Law and Policy Lab. He served briefly as interim Dean of Stanford Law School from January 2024 until June 2024.

== Academic work ==
Brest has made contributions to the fields of constitutional law, legal theory, decision-making, philanthropy, and social change strategy. Across his career, his scholarship has combined theoretical rigor with practical application, influencing multiple domains including legal education and philanthropic and nonprofit strategy.

=== Constitutional law ===
Brest’s early scholarship (1966–1987) focused on constitutional law, where he addressed foundational issues such as constitutional interpretation and the role of legislative motivation, as well as race discrimination and affirmative action. Notable works include the casebook, Processes of Constitutional Decisionmaking, which he wrote in 1975 and to which he later added Sanford Levinson and others as co-authors, and influential articles such as “Palmer v. Thompson: An Approach to the Problem of Unconstitutional Motivation,” (1971 Supreme Court Review), “Foreword: In Defense of the Antidiscrimination Principle” (Harvard Law Review, 1976), and “The Misconceived Quest for the Original Understanding” (Boston University Law Review, 1980). He is credited with coining the term “originalism” in the last of these articles, which argued that it was a poor strategy for constitutional interpretation.

Related to his expertise in constitutional law, Brest played a major role in drafting Stanford’s first Statement on Academic Freedom in 1974.

=== Clinical Legal Education ===
Brest pioneered innovations in clinical legal education at Stanford Law School, designing "Curriculum B" in the late 1970s, an experimental first-year curriculum that emphasized clinical lawyering skills, professional ethics, and interdisciplinary collaboration to integrate legal studies with practical training. As an early advocate for experiential learning, he supported hands-on education by helping students establish the East Palo Alto Community Law Project (EPACLP) in 1982, a student-run clinic offering legal services to underserved communities. During his deanship. Brest expanded clinical offerings in areas like negotiation and public interest law, and promoted learning professional judgment through simulated and real-world practice.

=== Problem Solving and Decision Making ===
Beginning in the late 1980s, Brest’s focus changed to include problem solving, decision making, and public policy. His 2010 book, Problem Solving, Decision Making, and Professional Judgment (co-authored with Linda Hamilton Krieger), integrates statistical inference and behavioral insights with legal and policy analysis and the role of lawyers. He also wrote about decision science, particularly as applied to issues of public policy.

=== Philanthropy and Impact Investing ===
During his presidency of the William and Flora Hewlett Foundation (2000–2012), Brest became a strong proponent of funders paying for grantees’ full actual overhead costs and for favoring the provision of unrestricted general operating support over grants for specific projects. He also has advocated evidence-based, outcome-oriented philanthropy, a theme explored in Money Well Spent: A Strategic Guide to Smart Philanthropy (co-authored with Hal Harvey; 2nd ed., 2018) and in essays such as “The Power of Theories of Change,” and “Strategic Philanthropy and Its Discontents.”

In the adjacent field of impact investing, Brest has argued for high standards of what constitutes social impact. Two influential essays on this topic are “When Can Impact Investing Create Real Impact” (with Kelly Born) and “How Investors Can (and Can’t) Create Social Value” (with Ronald Gilson and Mark Wolfson). His writings frequently appeared in Stanford Social Innovation Review, bridging academic theory and practical guidance for funders, nonprofits, and policy leaders. He also has written about ESG metrics, donor-advised funds, and program-related investments, reflecting a broader interest in aligning finance with social outcomes.

On returning to Stanford in 2012, Brest co-developed two online modules related to public policy, philanthropy, and nonprofit management: Developing a Strategy for Social Change (2020) (with Laura Hattendorf) and Thinking in Systems, (2023) (with Jason Bade).

=== Critical discourse and academic freedom ===
Most recently, Brest has been actively involved in efforts to promote critical discourse and academic freedom on campus. Together with Professor Norman Spaulding, he co-facilitates the ePluribus Project, a student-run initiative aimed at reducing polarization and promoting productive discussions across difference.

In an August 2024 guest essay in The New York Times, co-authored with historian Emily J. Levine, while applauding the aims of diversity, equity, and inclusion (DEI) programs on college campuses, Brest offered a critique of many such DEI programs as being ideologically tainted, inhibiting critical discourse, and exacerbating social divisions.

The authors proposed the alternative of a “pluralist” approach that encourages open dialogue, mutual respect, and critical thinking without privileging certain identities or perspectives.

== Other pursuits ==
Software Development

Paul and Iris Brest learned to program computers in the late 1970s to create a tool for placing footnotes at the bottom of word-processed pages, a feature Brest needed for his scholarship but that was unavailable in contemporary word processors. In 1981, they founded Pro/Tem Software and marketed Footnote, a post-processor for the popular WordStar word processor on the CP/M platform. Over the next several years, they released other software tools for scholars, culminating in Notebook II, a free-form database manager for academics and professionals that allowed users to organize notes, ideas, research summaries, and data in a flexible, hierarchical outline structure—and its companion, Bibliography. Bibliography contained a database of the prescribed citation formats of hundreds of academic journals, and could create tables of references for any specified journal so an author could easily submit an article for publication. During this period, Brest also taught a course on Artificial Intelligence and the Law, which involved students in developing expert systems.

== Personal life ==
Brest was an amateur pilot, holding a commercial twin rating. He owned a Cessna Skymaster, N5352S, together with the noted biologist Paul R. Ehrlich. Brest was an avid amateur violist and chamber music player for many years. He was an enthusiastic racquetball player, moving with his partners to pickleball in the wake of the Covid.

== Honors ==
Brest is an elected fellow of the American Academy of Arts and Sciences. He is one of the 50 most-cited legal scholars of all-time and the author of two of the 100 most-cited law review articles of all time. Brest holds honorary degrees from Northwestern University School of Law and Swarthmore College.

== Selected publications ==
- Paul Brest, Sanford Levinson, J.M. Balkin and Akhil Reed Amar, Reva B. Siegel, Processes of Constitutional Decision-Making, New York: Aspen, 5th ed., 2010 Supplement, 2010.
- Paul Brest and Linda Hamilton Krieger, Problem Solving, Decision Making, and Professional Judgment: A Guide for Lawyers and Policymakers, Oxford: Oxford University Press, 2010.
- Paul Brest and George Lowenstein, In Defense of Fear, Pittsburgh Post-Gazette, July 12, 2009, pg. B1.
- Paul Brest and Hal Harvey, Dealing with Hard Times: Advice for Foundations, Chronicle of Philanthropy, November 13, 2008.
- Paul Brest and Hal Harvey, Money Well Spent: A Strategic Plan for Smart Philanthropy, New York: Bloomberg Press, October 2008.
- Paul Brest, California's Diversity Legislation is Misguided, The Chronicle of Philanthropy, March 6, 2008.
- Paul Brest, Sanford Levinson, J.M. Balkin and Akhil Reed Amar, Processes of Constitutional Decision-Making, New York: Aspen, 5th ed., 2007 Supplement, 2007.
- Paul Brest, Sanford Levinson, J.M. Balkin, Akhil Reed Amar and Reva B. Siegel, Processes of Constitutional Decisionmaking: Cases and Materials, New York: Aspen Publishers, 5th ed., 2006.
- Paul Brest, Preface: How This Symposium Came About, 97 Northwestern University Law Review 1079-1080 (Spring 2003).
- Paul Brest, Some Comments on Grutter v. Bollinger, 51 Drake Law Review 683-696 (2003).

== See also ==
- List of law clerks for the ninth seat of the Supreme Court of the United States
