= Stanford Law Review =

Academic journal

- Discipline: Law
- Language: English

Publication details
- History: 1948–present
- Publisher: Stanford Law School (United States)
- Frequency: 6 issues, January to June

Standard abbreviations
- Bluebook: Stan. L. Rev.
- ISO 4: Stanf. Law Rev.

Indexing
- ISSN: 0038-9765 (print); 1939-8581 (web)
- LCCN: 52004133
- JSTOR: 00389765
- OCLC no.: 42821730

Links
- Journal homepage

The Stanford Law Review (SLR) is a legal journal produced independently by Stanford Law School students. The journal was established in 1948 with future U.S. Secretary of State Warren Christopher as its first president. The review produces six issues yearly between January and June and regularly publishes short-form content on the Stanford Law Review Online.

== Admissions ==
The Stanford Law Review selects members based on a competitive exercise that tests candidates on their editing skills and legal writing ability. There is not a firm number of accepted candidates each year; recent classes of new editors have ranged from about 40 to 45. The candidate exercise is distributed to candidates late in their first year at the law school. Transfer students are also eligible for admission through the same process.

== Rankings ==
Among United States law journals, Stanford Law Review is ranked third by Washington and Lee University Law School and third by a professor at the University of Oregon School of Journalism and Communication.

== Notable alumni ==
The review's editorial board has a president, who is effectively the editor-in-chief of the publication. Notable past Presidents include Warren Christopher (1949), Brooksley Born (1964), Raymond C. Fisher (1966), David F. Levi (1980), Paul G. Cassell (1984), and Tony West (1990). Other notable alumni are William Rehnquist, Sandra Day O'Connor, Shirley Hufstedler, Joshua Bolten, Carlos Watson, Geoffrey Berman, Steven Menashi, and Peter Thiel.

=== William Rehnquist and Sandra Day O'Connor ===
Two of the most notable alumni members of the Stanford Law Review, former Supreme Court Justices Sandra Day O'Connor and William Rehnquist, attended Stanford Law School at the same time and graduated together with the class of 1952. The two future Supreme Court Justices became very close friends and even dated for a short time. In 2019, author Evan Thomas published A Biography of Sandra Day O'Connor, in which he presented information that he obtained from Justice O'Connor's personal documents, kept closed at the Library of Congress, that in the spring of 1952, Rehnquist wrote a letter to O'Connor asking her to marry him. O'Connor turned down Rehnquist's proposal because she was then dating her future husband, John O'Connor. The two had publicly stated that they dated for a short time during law school but Rehnquist's marriage proposal to O'Connor had been kept a secret. The two served on the Supreme Court together from 1981 until Rehnquist's death in 2005.
