= Koskoff =

Koskoff is a surname. Notable people with the surname include:

- David Koskoff (born 1939), American attorney and author
- Emma Tillinger Koskoff (born 1972), American film producer
- Gertrude Koskoff (1911–1992), American politician
- Milton Koskoff (1907–1997), American politician
- Theodore I. Koskoff (1920–2007), American trial lawyer

== See also ==
- Kosoff
- Kossoff
