= Klarman =

Klarman is a surname. Notable people with the surname include:

- Herbert E. Klarman (1916–1999), American/Polish health economist
- Michael Klarman (born 1959), American legal historian
- Seth Klarman (born 1957), American billionaire hedge fund manager
