= Kosoff =

Kosoff is a surname. Notable people with the surname include:

- Brian Kosoff (born 1957), American photographer
- Harold Kosoff (1930–1995), American inventor

== See also ==
- Kossoff
