= Alan Bersin =

American lawyer

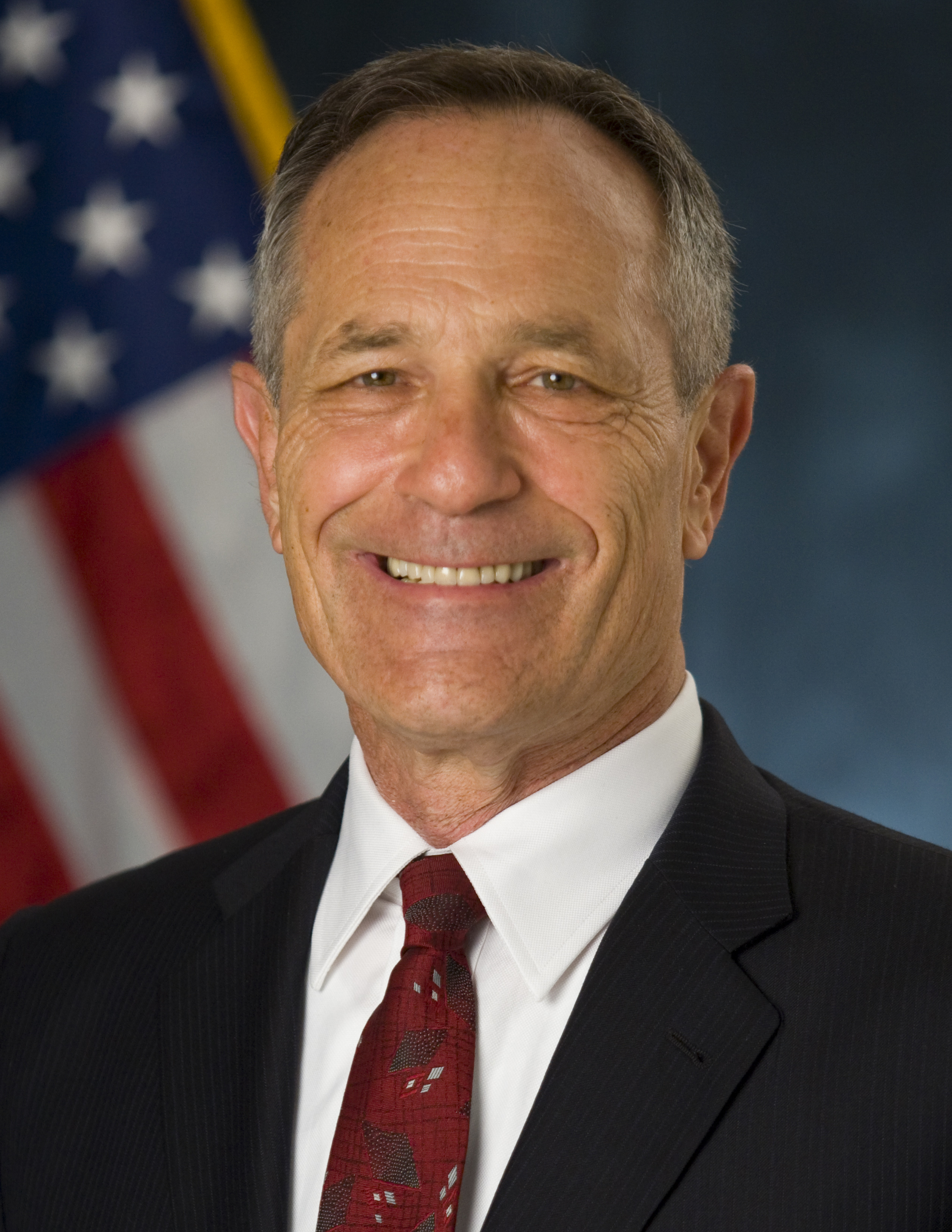

Commissioner of U.S. Customs and Border Protection
- In office March 27, 2010 – December 31, 2011
- President: Barack Obama
- Preceded by: Jayson Ahern (acting)
- Succeeded by: David V. Aguilar (acting)

U.S. Attorney for the Southern District of California
- In office 1993–1998
- President: Bill Clinton
- Preceded by: William Braniff
- Succeeded by: Charles La Bella

Personal details
- Born: Alan Douglas Bersin; October 15, 1946 (age 80) Brooklyn, New York, U.S.
- Spouse: Lisa Foster
- Children: 3 daughters
- Education: Harvard University (BA); Balliol College, Oxford; Yale University (JD)
- Profession: Attorney
- Known for: Superintendent of Public Education in San Diego City Schools; California Secretary of Education; Vice President of INTERPOL

Alan Douglas Bersin (born October 15, 1946) is an American lawyer. He also serves as an Inaugural Senior Fellow in the Homeland Security Project at the Belfer Center at the Harvard Kennedy School of Government, as a Global Fellow at the Woodrow Wilson Center for International Scholars, and as Inaugural North America Fellow at the Canada Institute and the Mexico Institute (Wilson Center). He is Chairman of the consulting firm BorderWorks Group, and Executive Chairman of Altana Trade.

Bersin spent the better part of two decades practicing at the Los Angeles law firm of Munger, Tolles & Olson, rising to become a senior partner. He then served in turn as the US Attorney for the Southern District of California and the US Border Czar, the Superintendent of the San Diego City Schools, the California Secretary of Education, and the Chairman of the San Diego County Regional Airport Authority. He was then the U.S. Department of Homeland Security (DHS) Secretary for International Affairs and Special Representative for Border Affairs, the Commissioner of U.S. Customs and Border Protection overseeing its 58,000-employee work force and operating budget of $12 billion, the DHS Assistant Secretary for International Affairs and Chief Diplomatic Officer, and the Vice President of INTERPOL for the Americas Region and a member of the INTERPOL Executive Committee.

== Early and personal life ==
Bersin was born in 1946 to Jewish parents, Arthur Bersin and Mildred (Laikin) Bersin, in Brooklyn, New York. His paternal grandparents were Russian Jewish immigrants Jacob and Rose Bersin. He is a member of Congregation Beth Israel in San Diego. He is fluent in Spanish.

He attended public schools and Hebrew school in New York City. Bersin attended Abraham Lincoln High School in Brooklyn, where he was a valedictorian. In his senior year at the high school, he wrote an essay that won first place in the High School Contest on the United Nations, sponsored by the American Association for the United Nations, won a citation from the Mayor’s Committee on Scholastic Achievement, and was the co-editor of Vanguard, the student newspaper.

Bersin is married to Lisa Foster, a Judge in the San Diego Superior Court. The couple has three daughters.

== College and law school ==
Bersin received an A.B. in American government from Harvard College (magna cum laude) in 1968, where he was secretary of the Kirkland House and vice president of Pi Eta. While at Harvard he won the Detur Prize for distinguished application to studies, and the James Bryant Conant Award for the best essay in natural science. He was also elected to the Phi Beta Kappa honor society.

Playing defensive lineman, offensive guard, and linebacker for the Harvard Crimson football team, which went undefeated in 1968, Bersin was named to the First Team All-Ivy League (in 1967 with among others Hank Paulson, Calvin Hill, Robert Hoffman, and Brian Dowling, and honorable mention in 1966), All-New England, and All-East (in 1967) football teams and was named an AP Honorable Mention All American. He was awarded post-graduate scholarships by the National Collegiate Athletic Association and the National Football Hall of Fame. In 1995 he was inducted into the Harvard Varsity Club Hall of Fame.

Bersin then attended Balliol College, Oxford as a Rhodes Scholar from 1969 to 1971. Bersin received a maximum annual stipend of $2,760.

In 1974, Bersin obtained a J.D. degree from Yale Law School. He was awarded the degree of Doctor of Laws (Honorary) by the University of San Diego in 1994, by California Western School of Law in 1996, and by the Thomas Jefferson School of Law in 2000.

== Career ==
=== Early years ===
==== Munger, Tolles & Olson ====
Bersin practiced at the Los Angeles law firm of Munger, Tolles & Olson from 1974 to 1992, and rose to be a senior partner. He specialized in complex RICO, securities, commercial, and insurance litigation. In 1992, he took a sabbatical and moved to San Diego to teach at the University of San Diego law school and work on Bill Clinton’s presidential campaign.

==== U.S. Attorney for the Southern District of California, and Border Czar ====
Bersin then served as the United States Attorney for the Southern District of California for five years, having been appointed by his former Rhodes Scholar classmate President Bill Clinton. From 1995 to 1998, he served as the Attorney General’s Southwest Border Representative, coordinating law enforcement on the border between the U.S. and Mexico, and was nicknamed the "Border Czar."

==== San Diego Superintendent of Public Education ====
From 1998 to 2005 he served as Superintendent of Public Education in San Diego City Schools, in control of the eighth-largest urban school district in the U.S. Speaking as to what he believed needed change, Bersin said: "Seniority counts above competence. This is anachronistic and makes no sense." He launched a major reorganization of the urban school district to focus its resources on instruction and on modernization of business infrastructure. During that time, between 2000 and 2003, he was a member—and then Chairman—of the California Commission on Teacher Credentialing.

==== California Secretary of Education ====
From July 2005 to December 2006 Bersin served as California's Secretary of Education, having been appointed by California Governor Arnold Schwarzenegger. Schwarzenegger then appointed Bersin to the California State Board of Education, where he served as a member until 2009.

==== Chairman of the San Diego County Regional Airport Authority ====
Bersin then served as Chairman of the San Diego County Regional Airport Authority, having been appointed by San Diego Mayor Jerry Sanders in December 2006. In 2007, the nonprofit electronic journalism outlet voiceofsandiego.org reported that Bersin was considering a run for San Diego City Attorney.

=== Department of Homeland Security ===
==== DHS Secretary for International Affairs, and Special Representative for Border Affairs ====
On April 15, 2009, Homeland Security Secretary Janet Napolitano announced the appointment of Bersin as the U.S. Department of Homeland Security (DHS) Secretary for International Affairs and Special Representative for Border Affairs. In the press release announcing his appointment, Secretary Napolitano said, "Alan brings years of vital experience working with local, state and international partners to help us meet the challenges we face at our borders. He will lead the effort to make our borders safe while working to promote commerce and trade." In 2009, Bersin served as Assistant Secretary and Special Representative for Border Affairs in DHS. He was the lead DHS representative on border affairs and strategy that related to security, immigration, narcotics, and trade, as well as for coordinating DHS border security initiatives.

==== Commissioner of U.S. Customs and Border Protection ====
From March 2010 to 2011, Bersin served as Commissioner of U.S. Customs and Border Protection (CBP). He oversaw the operations of CBP’s 58,000-employee work force, and managed a $12 billion operating budget. He oversaw CBP’s efforts to secure the borders of the U.S. and mitigate threats to it, while at the same time supporting facilitation on legal trade and travel by increasing CBP's collaboration with the trade community and speeding up customs clearance and duty settlement for approved importers. His recess appointment by President Obama in 2010 was effective with the same power and authority as if he had been confirmed until the end of the next session of Congress. Through the rest of 2010 and 2011, Republicans in the Senate refused to hold a vote although it held confirmation hearings on the nomination, so in December 2011 he resigned.

==== DHS Assistant Secretary for International Affairs, and Chief Diplomatic Officer ====
Starting in January 2012 and through 2017, Bersin served as Assistant Secretary for International Affairs, and as DHS Chief Diplomatic Officer. He oversaw DHS’s international engagement, was the DHS Secretary's principal advisor on international affairs, and led the DHS activities in strategic planning and policy formulation. He also served as Vice President of INTERPOL for the Americas Region, and was a member of the INTERPOL Executive Committee, from when he was elected to those positions in November 2012 until 2015.

=== Covington & Burling ===
After leaving government service, Bersin became a senior advisor at the international law firm Covington & Burling.

== Philanthropy and other activities ==
In 2014, Bersin announced the Mildred and Arthur Bersin Scholarship, to be awarded to students from Gompers Preparatory Academy, Abraham Lincoln High School, and the Preuss School who are accepted into Harvard University. He also donated a new weight room to Abraham Lincoln High School. He has also funded a Curtis-Liman Fellow to work with the Liman Center and Yale Law School’s clinical program on issues of criminal law enforcement and immigration. He served as a member of the Board of Overseers for Harvard University (2004–10), and the Chair of the Visiting Committee for the Harvard Graduate School of Education (2007–10). He is a member of the Council on Foreign Relations and of the Pacific Council on International Policy.

He serves as an Inaugural Senior Fellow in the Homeland Security Project at the Belfer Center at the Harvard Kennedy School of Government; as a Global Fellow at the Woodrow Wilson Center for International Scholars in Washington D.C.; as Inaugural North America Fellow at the Canada Institute and the Mexico Institute (Wilson Center); and as a member of the Advisory Committee to the Quebec Government Office in Washington. He is Chairman of BorderWorks Group, a consulting firm specializing in border security and management; and Executive Chairman of Altana Trade, which is devoted to providing machine learning and artificial intelligence-based insights on border management and global trade.

== Works ==
- Alan Bersin, Chappell Lawson, Juliette N. Kayyem (2020). Beyond 9/11; Homeland Security for the Twenty-First Century, MIT Press, ISBN 978-0262361330
- Austen D. Givens, Nathan E. Busch, Alan Douglas Bersin (2021). Homeland Security; An Introduction, Oxford University Press, ISBN 978-0190861858
- Lorraine McCall, Lars Karlsson, Philip Kretsedemas, Maria Burns, Thomas P.M. Barnett, Alan Bersin, Christopher M. Ellis, William Rials, Thomas P. Russo (2023). Immigration, the Borderlands, and the Resilient Homeland, Bernan Press, ISBN 978-1636713854

== See also ==
- List of U.S. executive branch czars
- List of Rhodes Scholars

Legal offices
Preceded by William Braniff	U.S. Attorney for the Southern District of California; 1993-98	Succeeded by Charles La Bella

Political offices
Preceded by none	U.S. Border Czar; 1995-98, 2009-11	Succeeded by Tom Homan
Preceded by Jayson P. Ahern; Acting	Commissioner of U.S. Customs and Border Protection; 2010–11	Succeeded by David Aguilar; Acting
