= Abraham Lincoln High School (Brooklyn) =

Public high school in Brooklyn, New York

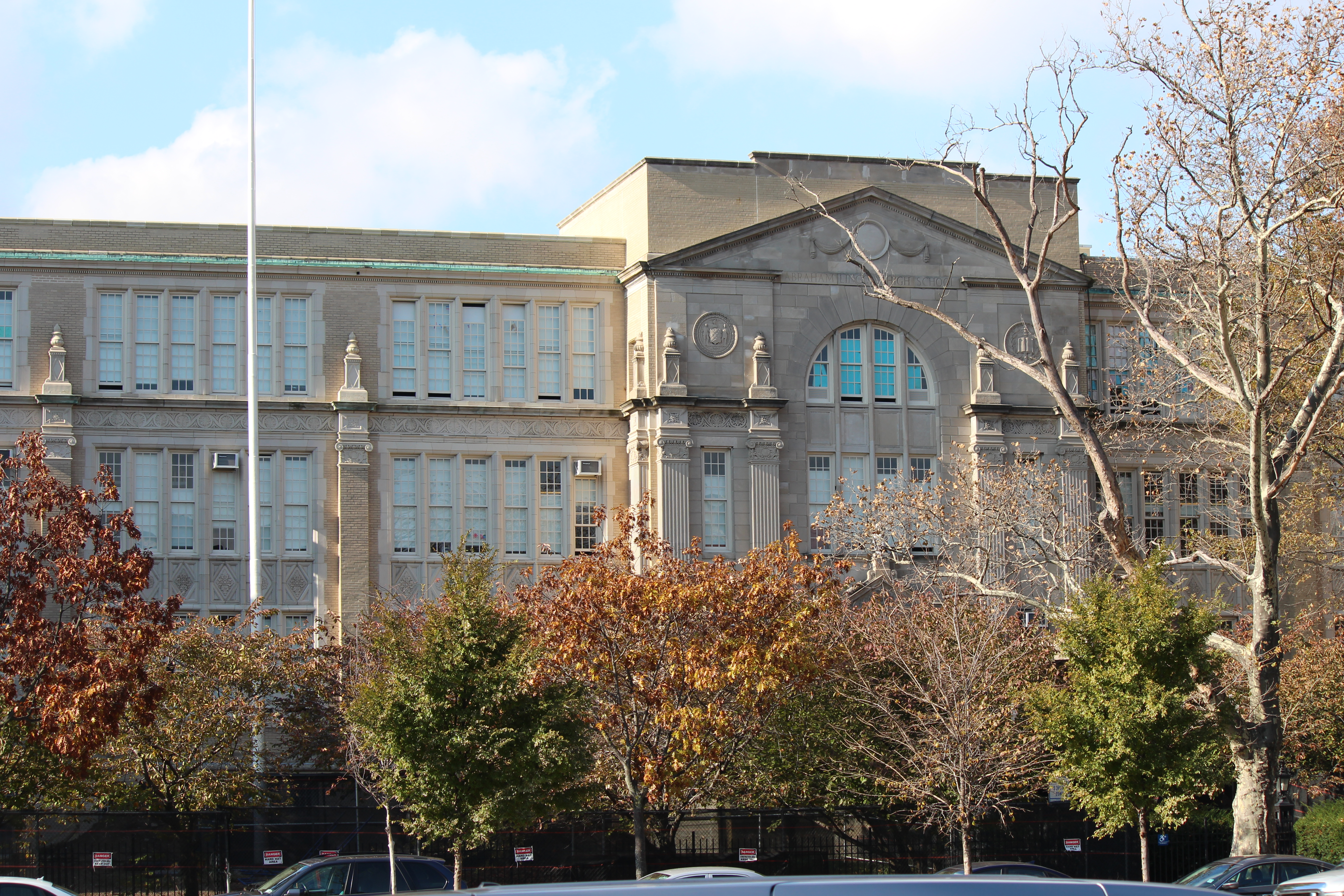

Location
- 2800 Ocean Parkway; Brooklyn, New York 11235; United States; 40°34′57″N 73°58′5″W

Information
- Type: Public
- Established: 1929; 97 years ago
- School district: New York City Department of Education
- School code: NY-332100010000-332100011410
- NCES School ID: 360015201906
- Principal: Ari A. Hoogenboom
- Teaching staff: 126.05 (on an FTE basis)
- Grades: 9–12
- Enrollment: 2,163 (2023-2024)
- Student to teacher ratio: 17.16
- Campus: City: Large
- Colors: Navy Blue, Black and Gray
- Mascot: Railsplitters
- USNWR ranking: 9,446
- Newspaper: The Lincoln Log
- Yearbook: Lincoln Landmark
- Nobel laureates: David Julius, Paul Berg, Jerome Karle, Arthur Kornberg
- Website: www.alhs.nyc

Abraham Lincoln High School is a public high school at 2800 Ocean Parkway in Brooklyn, New York City. Operated by the New York City Department of Education, the school was built in 1929. The current principal is Ari A. Hoogenboom.

It was built during the Great Depression, and to save money, one set of blueprints was used for Lincoln and other high schools in New York City, including Bayside High School, Samuel J. Tilden High School, John Adams High School, and Grover Cleveland High School.

The school features five gymnasiums, an outdoor football and track and field, a swimming pool, a photography studio, an animal science lab, an office classroom and an auditorium.

== History ==
The school was established in 1929 and named for former US president, Abraham Lincoln. From when the school opened its doors in September 1930 through the next 25 years, the school principal was Dr. Gabriel R. Mason. In 1983, Dr. Jack Pollock, the principal, reported that 8 of 10 graduates attended college and/or university.

However, by 2010 C.J. Hughes of The New York Times reported that Lincoln High School had "struggled" with student academic achievement. In 2009, the school only had a 58% graduation rating. The SAT averages for the school were 411 in reading, 432 in mathematics, and 401 in writing. The New York State averages during that year were 480 in reading, 500 in mathematics, and 470 in writing.

In 2014 Alan Bersin announced the Mildred and Arthur Bersin Scholarship, to be awarded to students from Gompers Preparatory Academy, Abraham Lincoln High School, and the Preuss School who are accepted into Harvard University.

== Admissions ==
As of the 2014–15 school year, the school had an enrollment of 2,325 students and 116.0 classroom teachers (on an FTE basis), for a student–teacher ratio of 20.0:1. There were 1,506 students (64.8% of enrollment) eligible for free lunch and 85 (3.7% of students) eligible for reduced-cost lunch.

The school's racial composition is very diverse. African American students made up 38.3% of the school's student population, a plurality of the student body. White students made up over one-quarter (26.3%), Hispanic and Latino (of any race) students made up over one-fifth (21.1%), Asian American students made up 14.0%, and Native Americans made up the remaining 0.3%.

Enrollment by Race/Ethnicity 2020–2021
Black	Hispanic	White	Asian	Two or more races	American Indian/Alaska Native	Native Hawaiian/Pacific Islander
753	486	264	259	22	17	15

== Extracurricular activities ==
The school offers many extracurricular activities, including Acting, Animal Care Squad Anime, Arista National Honor Society, Cheerleading, Chess, Chinese, Conflict Negotiation & Mediation, Debate Team, Gay–Straight Alliance, Guitar, Hiking, History, Key Club, Yearbook, Library Squad, Lincoln Ambassadors, Lincoln Log (newspaper), Marine Lab Squad, South Asian club, Weightlifting, and Yearbook.

=== Virtual Enterprise ===
The school has a virtual enterprise program where students create and manage their virtual businesses from product development, production, and distribution to marketing, sales, human resources, accounting, finance, and web design.

=== Veterinary science ===
The school has a veterinary science program in which students work with live animals.

=== Internship program ===
Students in the 11th grade can earn a credit by completing an internship with a private business, nonprofit organization or government agency that partners with the school. Students learn employment skills, develop professional relationships and receive professional advice.

=== Athletics ===
The school offers a variety of varsity and junior varsity sports. These sports include basketball, baseball, football, bowling, cross Country, handball, track and field, lacrosse, soccer, softball, swimming, tennis and volleyball. Lincoln varsity sports games were also televised on City Gridiron.

In 2013, borough president Marty Markowitz and councilman Domenic Recchia funded a new $2 million fitness center at the school. On November 27, 2018, the school along with alumnus Isaiah Whitehead commenced the opening of a new weight room.

ALHS athletic director Renan Ebeid was recognized by All-Stars Teachers contest by Major League Baseball.

== Notable alumni ==
- Nikita Ababiy (born 1998), class of 2016, professional boxer.
- Henry Adler (1915–2008), class of 1933, jazz drummer, drum teacher, author, and music publisher.
- Marv Albert (né Marvin Philip Aufrichtig; born 1941), class of 1959, television sportscaster.
- Eddie Antar, former businessman; owner of Crazy Eddie.
- Ken Auletta (born 1942), class of 1960, writer and novelist.
- David Bannett (1921-2022), class of 1937, electronics engineer, a pioneer in radar technologies in the Israel Air Force and the inventor of Shabbat elevators.
- Richard E. Bellman (1920–1984), class of 1937, applied mathematician and control theorist who invented dynamic programming in 1953.
- Paul Berg (1926–2023), class of 1943, recipient of the 1980 Nobel Prize in Chemistry.
- Alan Bersin (born 1946), US Attorney for the Southern District of California, Commissioner of US Customs and Border Protection, US Department of Homeland Security Secretary for International Affairs, and INTERPOL vice president.
- Mel Brooks (born Melvin Kaminsky; 1926), class of 1944, actor, filmmaker, comedian, songwriter, and playwright.
- Jordan Charney (born 1937), film and television character actor
- Haylynn Cohen (born 1980), fashion model; Malibu City Councilmember
- Herbert Cohen (born 1940), 2x Olympic foil fencer, 2x NCAA foil champion, U.S. national champion.
- Joan Copeland (Joan Kupchik née Miller; 1922–2022), actress.
- Bernard Cornfeld (1927–1995), businessman and international financier.
- Seymour Chwast (born 1931), class of 1949, graphic designer and illustrator.
- Vladislav Davidzon (born 1987), class of 2003, journalist, writer, and artist.
- Millie Deegan (1919–2002), professional baseball player in the All-American Girls Professional Baseball League.
- Neil Diamond (born 1941), class of 1958, singer-songwriter.
- Pete Emelianchik (born 1943), class of 1960, NFL football player (Philadelphia Eagles).
- Gene Federico (1918–1999), class of 1936, graphic designer.
- Nelson Figueroa (born 1974), class of 1992, MLB pitcher, Houston Astros
- John Forsythe (né Jacob Lincoln Freund, 1918–2010), class of 1934, film and television actor.
- Frank Frazetta (1928–2010), artist.
- Gary William Friedman, musical theatre, symphonic, film and television composer; Obie and Drama Desk Award winner.
- Shirley Gorelick (1924–2000), figurative painter, sculptor, and printmaker
- Louis Gossett Jr. (1936–2024), class of 1954, Academy Award-winning actor.
- Howard Greenfield (1936–1986), lyricist and songwriter.
- Michael Greif (born c. 1959), class of 1978; 4-time Tony Award- nominated theatrical director (Rent, Grey Gardens, Next to Normal, Dear Evan Hansen).
- David S. Guzick (born 1952), class of 1969, educator (Dean of the University of Rochester School of Medicine; President of the University of Florida Health System; member of the Institute of Medicine).
- Murray Heimberg (1925–2025), research and clinical pharmacologist (Distinguished Professor Emeritus at University of Tennessee Health Science Center).
- Joseph Heller (1923–1999), class of 1942, author (Catch-22).
- Leona Helmsley (1920–2007), real-estate businesswoman and hotelier; nicknamed "The Queen of Mean".
- Raul Hilberg (1926–2007), class of 1942, historian of genocide.
- Elizabeth Holtzman (born 1941), class of 1958, Democratic congresswoman
- Garland Jeffreys (born 1943), class of 1961, singer-songwriter and performing artist.
- David Julius (born 1955), physiologist and awarded the 2021 Nobel Prize in Physiology or Medicine, known for his work on molecular mechanisms of pain sensation and heat.
- Jerome Karle (1918–2013; born Jerome Karfunkle), class of 1933, recipient of the 1985 Nobel Prize in Chemistry.
- Harvey Keitel (born 1939), stage, film, and television actor
- Arthur Kornberg (1918–2007), class of 1933, recipient of the 1959 Nobel Prize in Medicine.
- Brian Kosoff (born 1957), class of 1975, editorial and advertising photographer who turned to landscape photography.
- Adam Kownacki (born 1989), professional boxer
- Mort Künstler (born 1927), artist
- Jack Laub (1926–2023), professional basketball player and pharmaceutical executive
- David Lazar (born 1957) writer, editor, and professor. Guggenheim Fellow in Nonfiction, 2015–16.
- Sheila Levrant de Bretteville (born 1940), class of 1959, graphic designer, artist and educator.
- Jay Maisel (born 1931), photographer
- Herbie Mann (né Herbert Jay Solomon, 1930–2003), jazz flutist.
- Wallace Markfield (1926–2002), class of 1943, comic novelist.
- Stephon Marbury (born 1977), class of 1995, professional basketball player (NBA).
- Lee Mazzilli (born 1955), class of 1973, 1986 World Champion major league baseball player (New York Mets, New York Yankees), manager and coach
- Earl-Jean McCrea (born 1942), singer and vocalist.
- Hank Medress (1938–2007), singer (The Tokens), best known for "The Lion Sleeps Tonight"
- Arthur Miller (1915–2005), class of 1932, playwright and screenwriter (Death of a Salesman, All My Sons, The Crucible, The Misfits).
- Marvin Minoff (1931–2009), film and television producer
- Larry Namer, class of 1966, businessman who founded the E! TV network.
- Dave Newmark (born 1946), professional NBA basketball player
- Victor Niederhoffer (1943–2026), hedge fund manager, U.S. Squash Champion and Paddleball Champion, bestselling author, and statistician.
- Irving Penn (1917–2009), photographer.
- Bertram L. Podell (1925–2005), politician
- Robert Pollack (biologist) (born 1940), professor of biological sciences and author
- Ronald Ribman, class of 1950, poet and playwright
- Buddy Rich, jazz drummer and bandleader.
- Desi Rodriguez (born 1996), professional basketball player
- Saul Rogovin, major league pitcher
- Marty Rosen (born 1943), former American football player
- Jack M. Sasson, Syria-born American academic and educator.
- Neil Sedaka (1939–2026), class of 1956, singer-songwriter and pianist.
- Mort Shuman, singer-songwriter and pianist.
- Jonathan Sperber, class of 1969, European historian and biographer of Karl Marx.
- Alex Steinweiss (1917– 2011), class of 1934, graphic designer and inventor of the album cover.
- Lance Stephenson, (born 1990), class of 2009, professional basketball player.
- Louis Stettner (born 1922), class of 1939, photographer noted for his pictures of "everyday people doing ordinary things" in both New York City and Paris.
- Frank Tarloff (1916–1999), class of 1932, Academy Award-winning screenwriter (Father Goose).
- Sebastian Telfair (born 1985), class of 2004, professional basketball player.
- Arthur Tress, class of 1958, surrealist photographer.
- Sherry Turkle, class of 1965, Abby Rockefeller Mauzé Professor of the Social Studies of Science and Technology (MIT)
- Jack B. Weinstein, class of 1939, Brooklyn federal district court judge.
- Dallas Williams, MLB player and coach.
- Isaiah Whitehead, class of 2014, professional basketball player formerly played for the Brooklyn Nets (NBA), now in the Israeli Basketball Premier League.
- Sid Youngelman (1931–1991), professional football lineman in the National Football League and American Football League
- Peter Zimroth, attorney and court-appointed monitor of the NYPD's policies and practices regarding stop-and-frisk.
- Paul Zweig, poet, memoirist, and critic; Pulitzer Prize for Poetry finalist and Guggenheim Fellow
