= Thurgood Marshall College =

Third college at UC San Diego

- UC San Diego
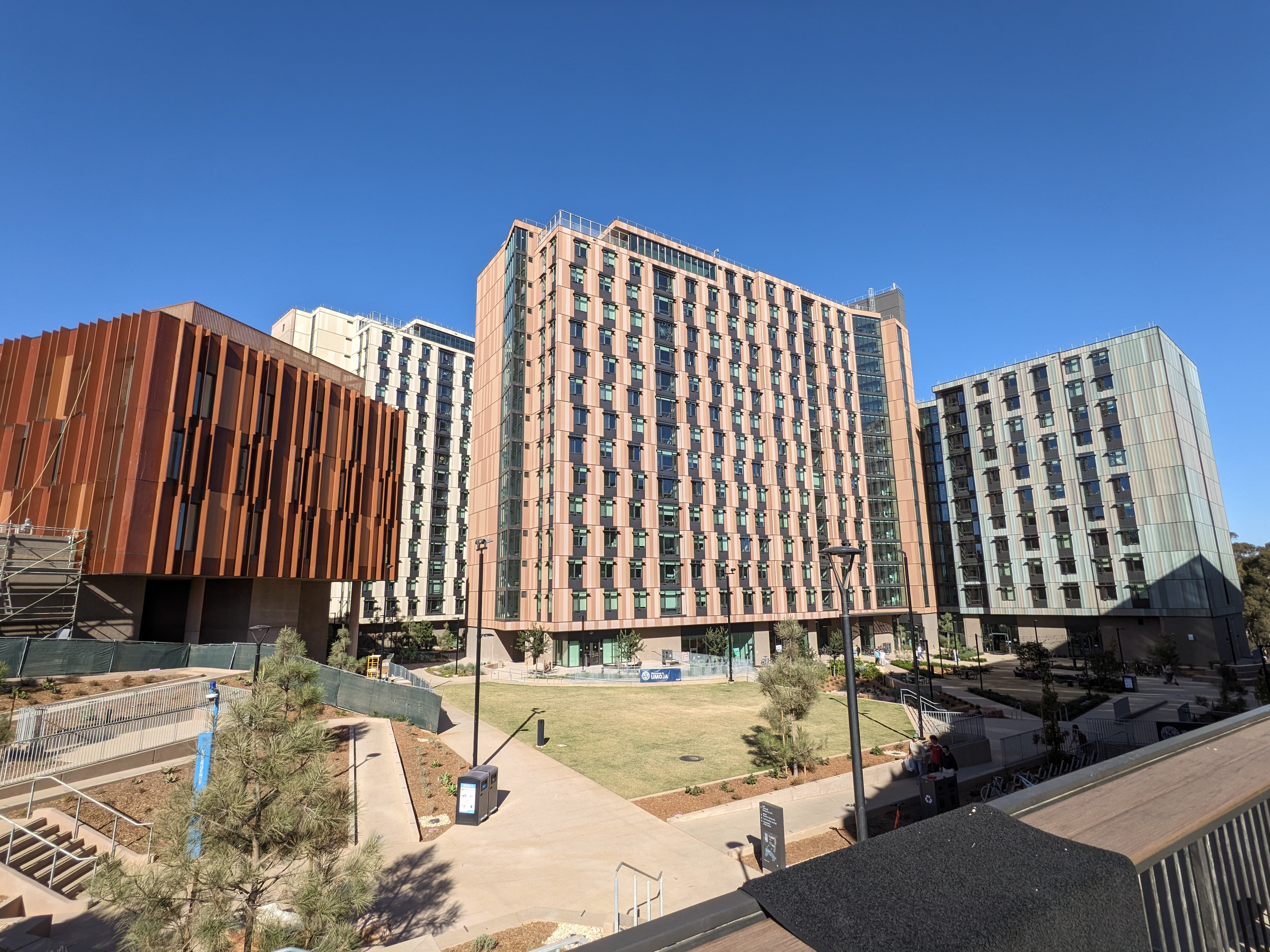
- Coordinates: 32.882575°N 117.241605°W
- Motto: Developing the Scholar and the Citizen
- Established: 1970 (Third)
- Status: Undergraduate, Liberal Arts
- Colors: Marshall Red
- Provost: Dr. Leslie Carver
- Deans: Dean of Student Affairs Dr. Amber Vlasnik Dean of Academic Advising Emily J. Gonzales Director of Residential Life Joanne Engler Director of Dimensions of Culture Program Dr. Amanda Solomon Amorao Associate Director of Dimensions of Culture Program Dr. Emily R. Johnston
- Residents: 3,937 (15.9% of UCSD undergraduate population)
- Core course: Dimensions of Culture (DOC)
- Major events: Festival: Marshall Palooza

Thurgood Marshall College, commonly referred to as Marshall College, is one of the eight undergraduate colleges at the University of California, San Diego. The college, which was originally called Third College, is named for Thurgood Marshall, who was the first African-American to serve as a Supreme Court Justice.

Marshall College's general education requirements promote a culture of community involvement and multiculturalism, emphasizing "scholarship, social responsibility and the belief that a liberal arts education must include an understanding of [one's] role in society." Significant academic programs and departments have come out of the college over many decades: Communication, Ethnic Studies, Third World Studies, African American Studies, Urban Studies & Planning, and Education Studies.

Founded as Third College in 1970 amid the student activism of the period, TMC's original aim was to help students understand their own community through a critical examination of diversity and community in the United States. Marshall College's required writing program is called Dimensions of Culture (DOC), and is a 3 quarter (1 year) sequence that explores race, identity, imagination, tradition, and the law in the United States. During President Obama's administration, the White House honored UC San Diego and Marshall College's Public Service minor and charter school outreach as exemplary community service institutions serving the United States.

== Early history ==
In November 1965, the College III Preliminary Planning Committee released the first substantial report on what form UCSD's third college would take. The committee, comprising faculty members George Backus, Henry Booker, Gabriel Jackson, C.D. Keeling, and committee chair Andrew Wright, suggested that College III should focus itself on history and theory.

The Wright Committee report suggested that the college have a muse—namely Clio, the Greek muse of history. History was chosen by the committee because it mixed humanism with science—College III would be a sort of "common ground" between the science of Revelle and the humanities of Muir.

In a quiet act of rebelliousness (or perhaps it was just individuality), the committee planned that College III students would only have to take three courses per quarter to graduate in four years, as opposed to the four it took at the other UCSD colleges. Citing the three-course "full load" at UC Santa Cruz, the committee suggested that taking four courses in one quarter would "make the students ride off in all directions," and that three-in depth courses would be preferable.

The final note of the Wright Committee report described what the committee felt was needed in a College III Provost "a paragon of intellectual vitality, scholarly accomplishment, and administrative talent... sympathetic with the aims of College III, but independent enough... to be able to shape the College in important ways." They asked that a provost be appointed as soon as possible.

By 1967, College III had found its first provost, Armin Rappaport, a history professor at U.C. Berkeley. It was appropriate that the provost of a college with Clio as its muse would be a historian, and Rappaport was that. By the time May rolled around, College III was now "Third College."

However, with the swirling political changes of the late 1960s, the college of Clio and Rappaport was never to be. Once the controversy and battles among students, faculty, and administration commenced—featuring lively figures such as Herbert Schiller, Herbert Marcuse, and Angela Davis—the future of Third College would be in a turmoil that didn't fully clear until it finally received its official name, Thurgood Marshall College, in 1993.

Chancellor William J. McGill persuaded Dr. Joseph Watson to become the first operational provost of Third College during this very turbulent time in 1970. Provost Watson's term lasted eleven years as he then assumed a higher campus position as Vice Chancellor for Student Affairs. Professor Faustina Solís then followed as the second college administrator and was also the university's first Latina provost. She served in that capacity from 1981 to 1988. Solís established public health coursework for undergraduates and medical students, following years of social work and health care for under-served populations. She was honored in 1990 when Thurgood Marshall Lecture Hall was renamed the Faustina F. Solís Hall.

== Student activism ==
=== Naming controversy ===
Student Activists from Third College

At its inception, students pushed for the new college to be named "Lumumba-Zapata College" in honor of the legendary twentieth century revolutionaries Patrice Lumumba and Emiliano Zapata. Unable to get approval for this name from UC Administration, the college was renamed Third College. This name did also inspire the idea that the student body would be one-third white students, one-third black students, and one-third definable minority students. Third College took up much of the activism that the campus was lacking, and the naming controversy was a catalyst for this movement. However, UCSD failed to attract enough black students for this plan to reach fruition and the UC Regents would not allow large scale deviation from the University of California's admission guidelines.

In the early 1990s, an attempt was made to name the college after Martin Luther King Jr., but failed when UCSD students objected to naming the college after someone who was charged with plagiarizing his doctoral dissertation. More to the point, King's family announced that they would rather see a full-fledged King College built in the South, and preferably in Atlanta.

In 1993 UCSD's Third College finally received its official name in honor of the famous lawyer and Supreme Court Justice Thurgood Marshall. Before becoming the first African American Supreme Court Justice, Marshall argued the 1954 landmark civil rights case Brown v. Board of Education. Justice Marshall was widely known and recognized for his historic contributions to American life and dedication to breaking down barriers to education, civil rights, freedom of speech, women's rights, and the right to privacy.

The name change to Marshall was met with protest from Third College students, who overtime had become attached to Third as a representation of their values and community. They argued that a changing of the name would result in a loss and erasure of this history.

=== DOC controversy ===
In the early 1990s, Thurgood Marshall College created a core freshman writing program that provided a critical examination of identity and diversity in American culture. The intellectual program was inspired by the University of Chicago and Columbia University's freshman humanities programs. The program, Dimensions of Culture (DOC), periodically generated heated debates among students, families, and alumni, based on difficult political issues.

In the spring of 2007, a new curriculum controversy arose pertaining to DOC as students at TMC began protesting against the administrators of the college. The Lumumba-Zapata Coalition (which had resurfaced with the addition of graduate students) along with other students claimed that DOC had lost some of its original messages, protesting against what they termed a "new and diluted" core writing requirement with a decreased focus on race and the ethnic significance of the individual within society. The protests, including picketing, began with the controversial non-renewal of two DOC Teaching Assistants’ contracts for the subsequent year. Others believed that the coalition was pushing an agenda of political indoctrination that conflicted with the academic goals of the Dimensions of Culture Program and the sensibility of a science oriented campus.

The protests had mixed effects. In response to the complaints in regards to the curriculum a new committee was set up to review and change the curriculum accordingly with an emphasis on hiring tenured faculty to teach DOC. Student positions with voting rights were included on the permanent committee so an equitable curriculum will be created reflecting full community input from both students and faculty. Thurgood Marshall College Student Council (TMCSC) issued a report recommending that DOC have an upper division course which also sparked the public service course. In August 2009, Co-Director of the DOC Program, Robert Horwitz stated, "Various criticisms were leveled at DOC in the last few years, and faculty and student investigations concluded that changes needed to be made. Those changes have been implemented and have resulted in a new DOC.”

== College programs ==
=== Minors ===
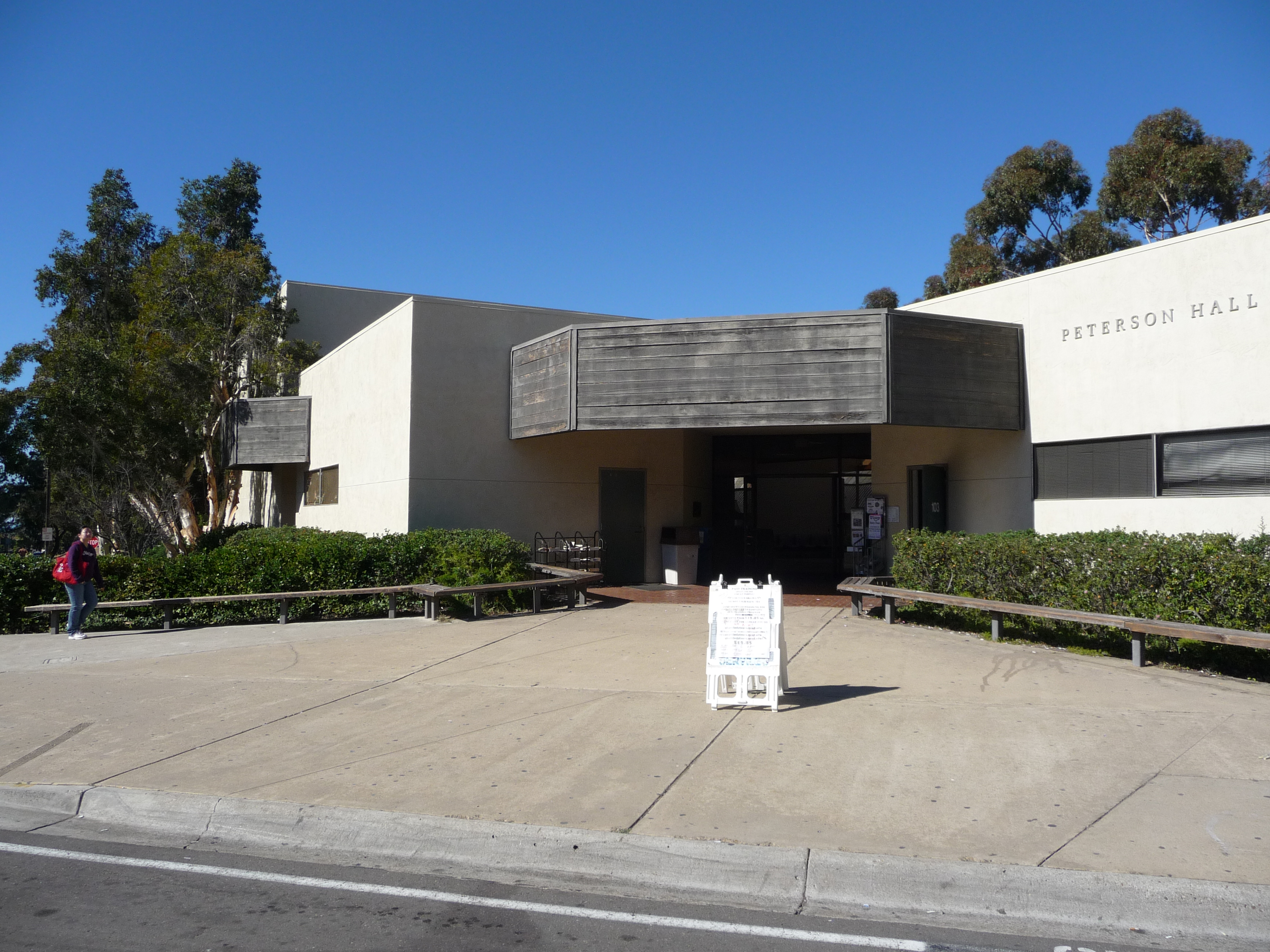
Peterson Hall, one of Marshall's lecture halls

Thurgood Marshall College has created more academic departments and programs than any other college at UCSD, including Third World Studies, Ethnic Studies, Education Studies, African American Studies Minor, and Urban Studies and Planning. TMC is now home to two UCSD Minors: the Public Service Minor and the Film Studies Minor.

The Public Service Minor encourages students to understand the history and practices of public service and to work towards the development of civic skills. Those skills and practices are essential cornerstones of participation in a democratic society regardless of one's chosen profession. The coursework for the minor emphasizes the history and emergence of the non-profit sector as a national institution distinct from the private and public spheres. The practicum aspects of the minor couples with the traditional academic work encourages students to see the connection between the deeds of charitable service and the historic worth of citizens participation in the common public franchise.

The Film Studies Minor provides students an opportunity to examine the many facets of American and International cinema. Students interested in exploring cinema as a multidimensional art medium will engage in the analysis of cinematic works of various forms. Study of film genres, history, theories, directors, cultural perspectives and more allow students to gain a robust understanding of cinema as a historical and contemporary means of expression. The interdisciplinary nature of the minor provides investigation of cinematic art through its connection to related fields such as Communication, Literature, Sociology and Visual Arts. Students pursuing the Film Studies Minor exhibit a wide range of interests; from those who plan graduate study in film to those who simply wish to understand better this powerful and influential medium.

=== Morehouse/Spelman/Xavier Student Exchange Program ===
The Morehouse/Spelman Student Exchange Program was officially launched in the fall quarter of 1989. This formal exchange program with two distinguished Historically Black Colleges was developed by Thurgood Marshall College and is open to all UCSD undergraduates. Morehouse College and Spelman College are both located in Atlanta, Georgia. Xavier University in New Orleans became the third historic Black college to have this exchange with Marshall College in 2016.

=== Marshall partnership schools ===
Then Thurgood Marshall College Provost Cecil Lytle and Sociology Professor Bud Mehan were instrumental in founding the Preuss School at UCSD, which opened in 1999 on campus despite strong opposition. The project was seen by faculty as a deviation from UC San Diego's focus on science and medicine. However, providing the impetus for the founding of The Preuss School reflected the social justice oriented mission of Marshall College. Between 2007 and 2012 Preuss has consistently been listed among the top 50 American high schools by both Newsweek and U.S. News & World Report.

After Preuss was established successfully, the idea and structure of the UCSD-supported charter school model was expanded to Gompers Preparatory Academy. Based on educational theories, the successes of Preuss should be able to be recreated in a different environment, which was why Gompers was selected. Gompers was historically one of the most dangerous and low performing schools in the district, and yet has been transformed into an academically rigorous school with 100% graduation rate with the transition to the charter school model.

The College maintains strong links to both charter schools by providing them with hundreds of undergraduate tutors and mentors every year from all six colleges. In addition, the College's Provost is a Preuss School Board Member.

=== Artist in residence ===
The artist-in-residence program, begun in 2006, brings to campus leading performers and visual artists from San Diego and Southern California to UC San Diego. Each artist is featured for one year and given the opportunity to develop new showcase work, which often goes on to fuller production off campus. Marshall College is the first college at UCSD to commission public art on campus, and has contributed in the creation of a vibrant campus community. Allan Havis, a professor from the Theatre Department, launched these programs during his term as college provost from 2006 to 2016.

== Student life ==
=== Campus ===
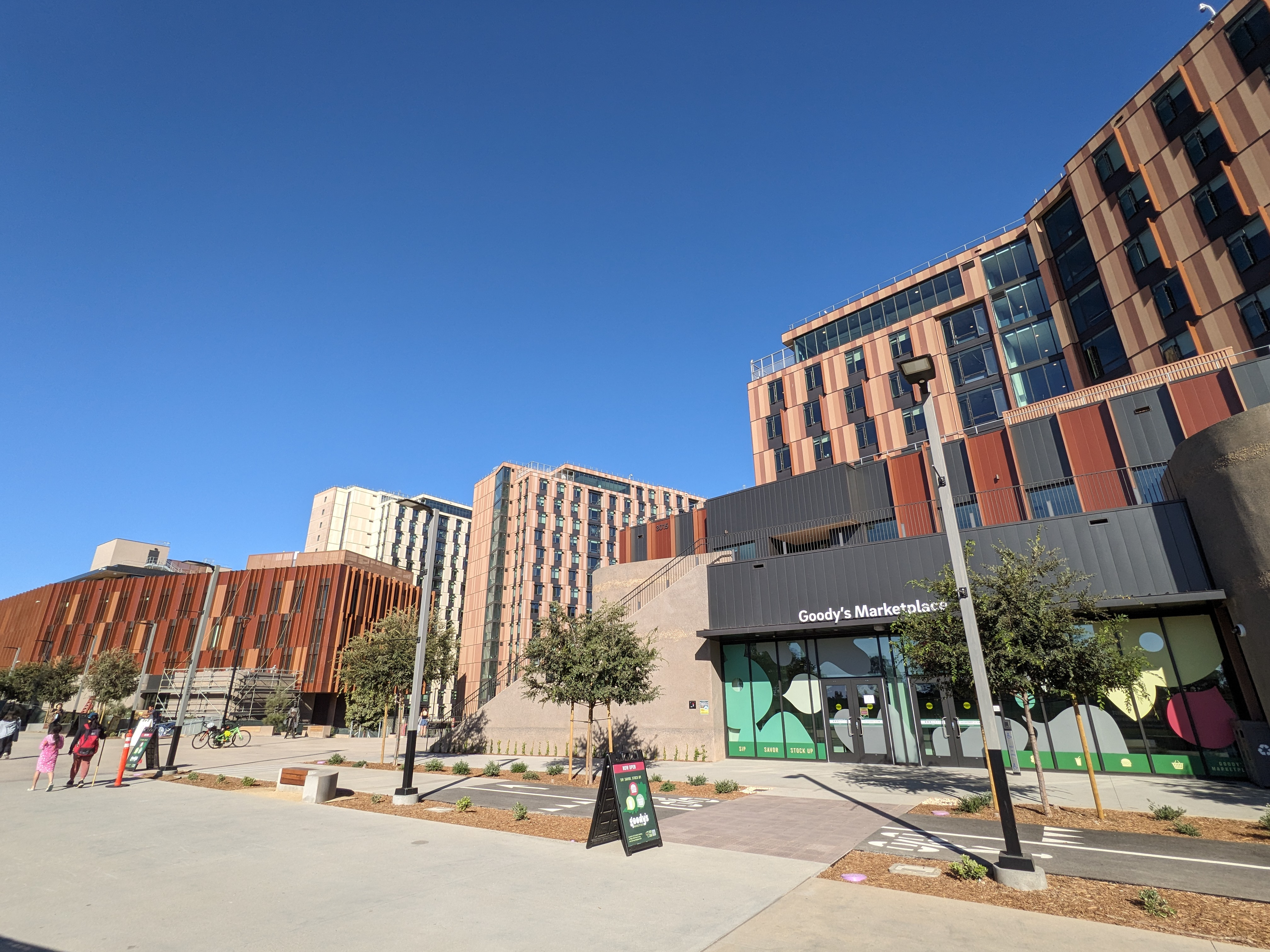
Marshall College as seen from Ridge Walk. From left to right: Brian C. Malk Hall, Alianza, Umoja, Coalition.

Marshall College is centered around the Ridge Walk North Living and Learning Neighborhood (RWNLLN), a development west of Geisel Library that opened in fall 2025. The neighborhood was designed with the theme of "The Woven Home", and students were involved in the buildings' design and names. Before 2025, Marshall students lived in the Pangea Apartments and Residence Halls.

Marshall consists of three residential buildings up to 18 floors tall—Alianza, Umoja, and Coalition—housing up to 2,400 students. Students live in 8- or 10-person suites, and all residents have access to kitchens.

Marshall College is also home to Goody's Marketplace, a checkout-free store powered by Amazon Just Walk Out, an esports center, the Triton Food Pantry, and the UC San Diego Glass Center, a glass-blowing studio set to open in early 2026.

=== Student involvement ===
Marshall College is home to a mix of 750+ student-led organizations, including student government and several Greek organizations.

==== Student organizations ====
- ACT (Active Community at TMC)
- Commuter Board
- CAUSE (Cultural Association Uniting Students through Education)
- Graduation Committee
- Judicial Board
- LC3 (Leadership Committee for Cultural Celebration)
- MAC (Marshall Activities Committee)
- Marshall Memos
- MSC (Marshall Spirit Crew)
- Marshallpalooza Committee
- SCORE (Student Committee on Residential Engagement)
- TMCSC (Thurgood Marshall College Student Council)
- TMTV (Thurgood Marshall Television)
- TRES (Transfer and Re-Entry Student Organizations)

==== Student programs ====
- Dine-with-a-Prof
- Each One Reach One
- Marshall Mentor Program
- Transfer Connect & Success

==== Leadership Development ====
- Dean's Office Internship
- Lift as You Climb
- Orientation Leaders (OL)
- Resident Advisors (RA)
- Resident Life Interns
