= The Baupost Group =

American hedge fund firm

The Baupost Group, L.L.C.
- Type: Private
- Industry: Hedge fund
- Founded: 1982; 44 years ago
- Founders: Seth Klarman; Howard H. Stevenson; Jordan Baruch; William J. Poorvu
- Headquarters: Boston, U.S.
- Key people: Seth Klarman (President); Jim Mooney (managing director)
- AUM: US$25 billion (2022)
- Number of employees: 61 (2020)
- Website: www.baupost.com

The Baupost Group is a hedge fund founded in 1982 by William Poorvu and partners Howard Stevenson, Jordan Baruch and Isaac Auerbach. Seth Klarman, who was asked by Poorvu to help run the fund, remains at its head today. Baupost Group's investment philosophy emphasizes risk management and is long-only. The firm, one of the largest hedge funds in the world, is a value investing manager. According to Bloomberg L.P., Baupost is ranked 4th in net gains since inception.

== Investment strategy ==
=== Risk ===
It was reported that the Baupost Group does not use leverage in its investments with the exception of real estate where for every one dollar invested the Baupost Group used one dollar of leverage.

It was reported that Baupost CEO Seth Klarman explained in a speech to MIT students that investment research driven by emotion is risky and can lead to a bad investment.

=== Performance ===
From its founding the firm have generated an average annual return of 20%.

From 2014 to 2024 Baupost generated returns of about 4% per year

== Investment history ==
With the rise of distressed debt sales in Europe caused by the sovereign debt crisis Baupost Group in 2011 opened its first international office in London to take advantage of investment opportunities in European commercial property market, corporate debt trading at distressed valuations and structured products.

=== Walnut Place ===
According to a Reuters article, which cites Bank of New York Mellon v. Walnut Place LLC et al., the Baupost Group is Walnut Place. Using a traditional hedge fund tool, legal challenges of distressed bond settlements, the Baupost Group is attempting to force Bank of America to increase its settlement of Reps & Warranties of Countrywide sub-prime bonds. If the settlement were to be increased The Baupost group stands to make gains on bonds that they bought at very low values. It is unclear why the Baupost Group did not use their real name in the suit.

=== Natural resource extraction in Melancthon, Ontario, Canada ===
In 2006 Baupost Group formed Highland Companies, a Nova Scotia-based corporation that began buying farmland in Melancthon Township, approximately 120 kilometres north of Toronto, Ontario, purportedly for the purpose of farming. Having amassed over 7,000 acres by early 2011, then being actively farmed by Highland Companies, the Company submitted an application for a 2,316-acre Amabel dolomite mega-quarry. The application has seen heated opposition, as opponents raise concerns about groundwater contamination, local heritage, food security concerns, as well as a host of ancillary issues such as truck traffic congestion, highway safety, noise and dust pollution. In November 2012, Highland Companies withdrew the application in response to that concerted community opposition.

=== Post-2008 financial crisis ===
After the 2008 financial crisis, Baupost Group sought to purchase insurance as a hedge against the value of money declining as a result of government intervention which was a risk researchers at the company were concerned about. To execute this, Baupost Group purchased options for five-year Treasury bonds that would become profitable if Treasury bonds dropped sharply.

== Company ==
It was reported that in 2004, 42 employees worked at Baupost Group: 12 investment focused and 30 administrative.

=== Assets ===
Baupost Group's assets were $30 million in 1982, and $29.9 billion as of December 31, 2013.

=== Offices ===
- Boston (1982)
- London (2011)

=== Key people ===
- Seth Klarman, founder and president
- Jim Mooney, Managing Director
