= Marty Rosen =

American football player (born 1943)

Marty Rosen (born July 14, 1943) is a former American football player. He was a standout player at Lincoln High School in Brooklyn, NYC. He was selected to the All American team of 1961. He played college football at the University of South Carolina where he played running back and corner back as well as running back punts and kickoffs. He played alongside and remains a friend of quarterback Dan Reeves. Despite receiving invites to the National Football League, he wound up playing 4 years in the Canadian Football League, including two seasons with the Winnipeg Blue Bombers.

== Life outside football ==
Rosen had a garment company for thirty years. He retired for seven years and finally returned for a career in the wine business. He has lived in Englewood, New Jersey for the past 24 years. Rosen has two children and three grandchildren.
