= From Jim Crow to Civil Rights =

2004 book

- Author: Michael Klarman
- Genre: Nonfiction
- Publisher: Oxford University Press
- Publication date: 2004

From Jim Crow to Civil Rights: The Supreme Court and the Struggle for Racial Equality is a 2004 book by American historian Michael Klarman. It was a winner of the 2005 Bancroft Prize.

== References and further reading ==
- "The Bancroft Prizes: Current & previous awards". Columbia University Libraries.
- Finkelman, Paul (2005). "From Jim Crow to Civil Rights: The Supreme Court and the Struggle for Racial Equality". Review. Harvard Law Review. 118 (3): 973–1030.
- Carson, Clayborne (2005). "From Jim Crow to Civil Rights: The Supreme Court and the Struggle for Racial Equality". Review. Stanford Law Review. 57 (4).
- Graber, Mark A. (2005). "From Jim Crow to Civil Rights: The Supreme Court and the Struggle for Racial Equality". Review. The American Historical Review. 110 (3): 804–805. doi:10.1086/ahr.110.3.804.
- Dudziak, Mary L. (2005). "The court and social context in civil rights history". University of Chicago Law Review. 72 (1): 429–454.
