= Murray Heimberg =

American medical scientist (1925–2025)

Murray Heimberg (January 5, 1925 – November 17, 2025) was an American research and clinical pharmacologist who was Distinguished Professor Emeritus at University of Tennessee Health Science Center (UTHSC).

Heimberg grew up in Brighton Beach, Brooklyn, New York. Due to his father's illness, as the eldest child in his family he began working at the age of 10. He graduated from Abraham Lincoln High School at age 16. His graduation date was just a few days before the attack on Pearl Harbor. He took a job on a dairy farm in upstate New York which would qualify him for free tuition at Cornell University. Shortly after his 18th birthday, he chose to enlist in the US Army.

At UTHSC, Heimberg performed extensive research in and treating of patients for metabolic cardiovascular illnesses at both Methodist University Hospital and the Veteran’s Hospital. After his military service, he returned to Cornell University on the GI bill to be a pre-med student. He completed both a BS and MS at Cornell, then enrolled at Duke University Medical School. His PhD in Biochemistry was completed in 1952.

== Death ==
Heimberg died in Memphis, Tennessee, on November 17, 2025, at the age of 100. He was survived by two sons, two stepsons, four grandchildren, and extended family.
