= Herbert E. Klarman =

American economist

- Born: December 21, 1916; Chmielnik, Austria-Hungary
- Died: June 17, 1999 (aged 82); Baltimore, Maryland, U.S.
- Children: Seth Klarman; Michael Klarman
- Awards: Guggenheim Fellowship (1976)

Academic background
- Education: Columbia College (BA); University of Wisconsin (PhD)

Academic work
- Discipline: Healthcare economics
- Institutions: Johns Hopkins University; State University of New York; New York University
- Influenced: David Guzick

Herbert E. Klarman (December 21, 1916 – June 17, 1999) was an American/Polish health economist. He was a professor at Johns Hopkins University, State University of New York, and New York University. He was the recipient of a Guggenheim Fellowship in 1976.

== Biography ==
Klarman was born in Chmielnik, in modern day Poland, from a Jewish family. At the time it was part of the Military General Government of Lublin, Austria-Hungary. He emigrated to New York City in 1929. He graduated from James Monroe High School and earned his bachelor's degree in economics from Columbia College in 1939 and his doctorate in public finance from the University of Wisconsin–Madison in 1946. Klarman was the author of numerous articles and books on the economics of healthcare and was considered a "leading authority" on the economics of healthcare. His 1965 book The Economics of Health, which was commissioned by the Ford Foundation, is considered a significant early piece of literature on how standard economic principles could be applied to medical care.

His students included David Guzick, former president of University of Florida Health.

== Publications ==
=== Most cited journal articles ===
- Klarman, H.E. and Rosenthal, G.D., 1968. Cost effectiveness analysis applied to the treatment of chronic renal disease. Medical care, 6(1), pages 48–54. Jstor (Cited 454 times, according to Google Scholar)
- Klarman, H.E., 1974. Application of cost-benefit analysis to the health services and the special case of technologic innovation. International Journal of Health Services, 4(2), pages 325–352. [Klarman, H.E., 1974. Application of cost-benefit analysis to the health services and the special case of technologic innovation. International Journal of Health Services, 4(2), pages 325–352. Jstor] (Cited 109 times, according to Google Scholar.)
- Klarman, H.E., 1967. Present status of cost-benefit analysis in the health field. American Journal of Public Health and the Nation's Health, 57(11), pages 1948–1953. [Klarman, H.E., 1967. Present status of cost-benefit analysis in the health field. American Journal of Public Health and the Nation's Health, 57(11), pages 1948–1953.] (open access) (Cited 90 times, according to Google Scholar.)
- Klarman, H.E., 1982. The road to cost-effectiveness analysis. The Milbank Memorial Fund Quarterly. Health and Society, pages 585–603. (open access) (Cited 50 times, according to Google Scholar.)

== Personal life ==
Klarman died on June 17, 1999, from lymphoma at Union Memorial Hospital in Baltimore. He is the father of billionaire investor Seth Klarman and constitutional law professor Michael Klarman.
