= Pete Emelianchik =

American football player (born 1943)

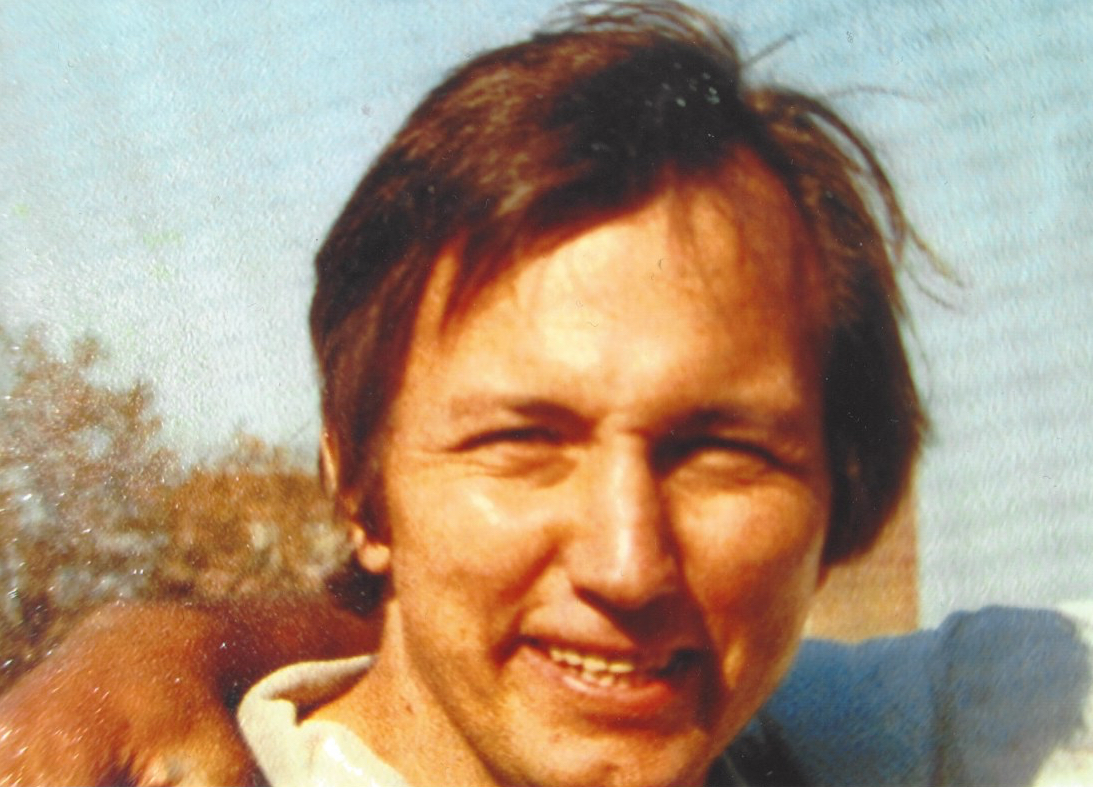

No. 39
- Position: Tight end

Personal information
- Born: November 19, 1943 (age 82); Brooklyn, New York, U.S.
- Listed height: 6 ft 2 in (1.88 m)
- Listed weight: 213 lb (97 kg)

Career information
- High school: Abraham Lincoln High School
- College: University of Richmond
- NFL draft: 1966: undrafted

Career history
- 1967: Philadelphia Eagles
- Stats at Pro Football Reference

Peter Adam Emelianchik (born November 19, 1943) is a retired American football player. Emelianchik is one of three players to have played football at Abraham Lincoln High School in Brooklyn and reach the National Football League.

== Football career ==
Emelianchik played tight end for the Dodge City Junior College Conquistadors in 1961 and 1962, and was voted Junior College All American in 1962. He then played for the University of Richmond Spiders in 1963 and 1964. Emelianchik was voted all-Southern Conference at end as a junior in 1963, but was injured during his senior year and not drafted by any NFL teams. He was signed as a free agent by the Philadelphia Eagles in 1967, and played on special teams in the last game of the season against the Cleveland Browns but did not record any statistics.

Emelianchik returned to the Eagles for training camp in 1968, and even caught a touchdown pass from John Huarte in a preseason game, but did not make the team.

His football career ended when he was the first player cut in training camp by the New York Giants in 1969.

== After football ==
After his football career ended, Emelianchik taught physical education at James J. Reynolds Jr. High School in Brooklyn, NY. In 2017, he was inducted into the Dodge City Junior College Athletics Hall of Fame.

Emelianchik is a lifetime member of American Mensa.
