= William J. Poorvu =

American businessman and academic

- Occupation: Real estate investor

Academic background
- Education: Harvard Business school Yale University

William J. Poorvu is an American real estate investor, civic leader and philanthropist. Currently an adjunct professor in entrepreneurship, emeritus at Harvard Business School, he taught on the HBS faculty from 1973 until 2002.

== Education ==
Poorvu earned his B.A. from Yale University in 1956 and his MBA from HBS in 1958.

== Career ==
Poorvu is the co-founder, chairman, and co-chair of the advisory board of the hedge fund The Baupost Group, currently led by Seth Klarman with $29.4 billion AUM in 2012. He is a member of the Carnegie Corporation Investment Committee and a former member of the Yale University Investment Committee and of the Yale University Council. He is a Trustee of the Gilder Lehrman Institute of American History. In April 2013, he was elected to the American Academy of Arts & Sciences. He was the first adjunct faculty member at the Harvard Business School to be recognized with a named chair. He was also on the faculty of the Harvard Graduate School of Design.

== Selected works ==
- Poorvu, William J. Creating and Growing Real Estate Wealth: The 4 Stages to a Lifetime of Success. Upper Saddle River, N.J.: Wharton School Pub, 2008.
- Poorvu, William J., and Jeffrey L. Cruikshank. The Real Estate Game: The Intelligent Guide to Decision-Making and Investment. New York, NY: Free Press, 1999.
  - also translated into Japanese as ハーバード・ビジネススクールが教える不動産投資ゲーム / Hābādo bijinesu sukūru ga oshieru fudōsan tōshi gēmu
- Poorvu, William J. The Real Estate Challenge: Capitalizing on Change. Prentice Hall, 1996.
- Poorvu, William J Real Estate: A Case Study Approach. Prentice Hall, 1993.
