= Clara Pratt =

American politician (1907–1998)

Member of the Connecticut House of Representatives from Plainville
- In office 1951–1953 Serving with Charles C. Taetsch
- Preceded by: Charles A. Hadfield; James F. Millerick
- Succeeded by: John A. Villardi; Gertrude Koskoff

Personal details
- Born: 1907 New Hartford, Connecticut, U.S.
- Died: December 23, 1998 (aged 91)
- Party: Republican
- Spouse: Samuel Pratt

Clara E. Pratt (1907 – December 23, 1998) was an American politician who served in the Connecticut House of Representatives from 1951 to 1953, representing the town of Plainville as a Republican.
