= Preuss School =

Coordinates: 32.882855°N 117.222432°W

The Preuss School

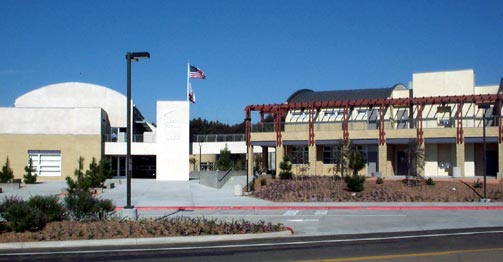
- The Preuss School campus, as seen from Voigt Drive.

Location
- 9500 Gilman Drive; La Jolla, California 92037

Information
- School type: Charter secondary
- Founded: 1999
- School district: San Diego Unified School District
- Principal: Matthew Steitz
- Faculty: 45 full-time
- Grades: 6–12
- Enrollment: 848 (2020–21)
- Language: English
- Campus: Urban
- Colors: Blue and gold ██
- Mascot: The Triton
- Website: preuss.ucsd.edu

The Preuss School, Preuss School UCSD, or Preuss Model School (/prɔɪs/ PROYSS), is a coeducational college-preparatory charter day school established on a $14 million campus, situated on the campus of the University of California, San Diego. The school was named in recognition of a gift from the Preuss Family Foundation and is chartered under San Diego Unified School District.

Founded in 1999 in the wake of passage of California Proposition 209, Preuss uses an intensive college preparatory curriculum to educate low-income students between sixth and twelfth grade, hoping to improve their historical under-representation on the campuses of the University of California. Criteria for admission include that the student's primary guardian lacks a college education and that the student's family qualifies for federal free or reduced-price lunches under the National School Lunch Act.

The school, which charges no tuition, has received a six-year accreditation from the Western Association of Schools and Colleges, has been evaluated as a National Blue Ribbon School and a California Distinguished School, and has been named by The Center of Education Reform as one of the top charter schools in America and by the University of Southern California Center for Educational Governance as the top charter school in California. Between 2007 and 2012 Preuss has consistently been listed among the top 50 American high schools by both Newsweek and U.S. News & World Report. Preuss has also been noted for sending a high percentage (96%) of its graduates to four-year universities.

== History ==
A group of faculty members at the University of California, San Diego, first conceived the idea of establishing a college-preparatory school for minority groups after California Proposition 209, a state measure that banned the use of affirmative action, passed in 1996. It was their belief, as expressed by Cecil Lytle, provost of Thurgood Marshall College, that public universities were not active enough in creating educational opportunities for the state's most disadvantaged youth. Faculty members Hugh Mehan and Peter Gourevitch proposed establishing a college-preparatory school that would admit only low-income youths with the potential of becoming first-generation college students. In 1997, the proposal was sent to the Regents of the University of California for approval. The regents, citing concerns over fiscal responsibility and oversight, rejected the proposal.

Following the Regents' vote, Lytle, Mehan, and Gourevitch made changes to their plan. In the new proposal, the project was to be mostly privately funded and was to have an oversight agency known as the Center for Research on Educational Equity, Access, and Teaching Excellence (CREATE). CREATE would be responsible for maintaining Preuss as an example for other institutions of public education. In addition, it would coordinate efforts between the university and Preuss, including using the school for research on educational equality and extending this research to other neighborhood schools. This second proposal was brought to the regents and, assisted by public outcry against the university and positive press for the school from The San Diego Union-Tribune, The Sacramento Bee, and the Los Angeles Times, it was approved.

Doris Alvarez, 1997 National Principal of the Year, was selected to head the project. Alvarez in turn, selected Janis Gabay, 1990 National Teacher of the Year, to head the faculty. After funding was obtained in 1998, the school began accepting applications. By May 1999, the school had received more than 500 applications for the initial classes. About 300 of these were deemed acceptable by the admissions board, and 150 of them were then chosen by lottery. The group included about 50 students in each of three grades—sixth, seventh, and eighth—and the school continued to add a new sixth-grade class each fall until the intended total enrollment of 800 was reached.

As Preuss has aged and garnered attention, it has influenced other schools. Gompers Middle School, also founded by Cecil Lytle, was modeled after Preuss and took advice from CREATE. When Gompers first opened, much of its curriculum, faculty development, and community outreach plans were based on those in place at Preuss. Southeastern San Diego–based Lincoln High also used Preuss as a guide, and the University of California, Davis, (UC Davis) and the University of California, Berkeley, (UC Berkeley) studied it while designing their own high schools for disadvantaged youth.

In 2014, Alan Bersin announced the Mildred and Arthur Bersin Scholarship, to be awarded to students from Gompers Preparatory Academy, Abraham Lincoln High School, and the Preuss School who are accepted into Harvard University.

== Facilities ==
From its conception, it was decided that it would be best for the school to be situated on the UCSD campus. An early CREATE report authored by Bud Mehan stated that "operating on university grounds acts to integrate students into the culture of learning associated with a university campus" and that this location allows for "UCSD students to serve as role models for the students they tutor." Despite this goal, finding available space on UCSD's campus for a full high school facility proved challenging. For the first year of its existence, Preuss was housed on the campus of the Thurgood Marshall College, in a temporary bungalow facility known as "La Casa", surrounded by eucalyptus trees and within walking distance of UCSD's main library, Geisel Library.

In August 2000, Preuss moved to its own new campus at the northeast corner of the UCSD campus. The campus cost about $14 million, all of which was procured from community donors and organizations during a five-month fundraising campaign. The campus has five buildings for classrooms; each building has six classrooms, three on the first story and three on the second. The one exception to this is the science building, which requires more room for labs and hence has four rooms in its building. The campus includes the main office; a gymnasium used for assemblies, physical education, theatre performances, and choirs; an outdoor cafeteria and amphitheater; a library that includes a media and resource center; and a lacrosse and soccer facility. The front of the school includes a loading and unloading dock for the school buses. While an open campus for its initial years, by the 2006 school year the Preuss campus was fenced around the perimeter. During the 2007 school year, a secondary physical education field was paved over and converted to two additional bungalow buildings intended to be used for music and the arts.

== Admissions ==
Annually, Preuss receives 800 applications from fifth graders for 110 spots in the incoming sixth-grade class. Preuss selects from this pool via a blind lottery. To be eligible for the lottery an applicant must meet three criteria: the student must qualify for federal free- or reduced-price lunches under the National School Lunch Act, the student's primary guardians must not be college graduates, and the student must demonstrate proper motivation, through elementary school academic records and through completion of an admissions application which includes essays and teacher recommendations. Of the students accepted, 25% scored in the top quartile on California standardized tests, 50% in the middle quartiles, and 25% in the bottom quartile.

Preuss primarily recruits applicants at elementary and junior high schools in low-income parts of SDUSD and the Sweetwater Union High School District. Preuss staff visit these schools and present to parents and teachers, in both English and Spanish, about the mission of the school and the application process. Preuss staff are also responsible for distributing application materials to local churches and libraries and community organizations like the San Diego Urban League and the Parent Institute.

According to charter renewal information provided by Preuss to SDUSD, Preuss believes that the student demographics that result from this admission process are reflective of the low-income communities that they recruit in. As of 2011, Preuss was 67% Hispanic, 19% Asian and Pacific Islander, 10% African American, and 4% White. This is divergent from SDUSD's demographics, which is 46% Hispanic, 15% Asian and Pacific Islander, 12% African American, and 24% White.

== Academics ==
The Preuss curriculum is shaped around college preparatory course requirements known within the University of California and California State University system as A–G courses. Preuss also takes the pedagogical position that all students should be allowed to take the same courses. As such, Preuss has an untracked curriculum that requires all students to attend the same college preparatory courses.

On the Preuss campus, students study basic algebra, geometry, pre-calculus, and calculus, and later can take more advanced courses on the UCSD campus, which they travel to via shuttle. Required science classes include Earth sciences, physics, biology, and chemistry. Required history classes cover Western civilization, as well as U.S. history, European history, and government and politics at the advanced placement (AP) level. Every Preuss student studies Spanish for at least three years, with an option for as many as five. English and physical education are also included in the required core curriculum. As a result of these required courses, 100% of Preuss graduates complete the A–G course list. Only 38% of San Diego Unified students do the same.

Throughout this curriculum, Preuss students are required to take courses at the advanced placement (AP) level, when offered. This requirement is meant to improve the student's chances for college admission and to reduce the number of college courses these low-income students might later have to take and pay for. By graduation, all Preuss students will have taken at least six AP courses.

Throughout all seven years at Preuss, students take an advisory course known as University Prep with the same teacher. This homeroom-like experience enables one teacher to become well-acquainted with students, their growth, their families, and their domestic situation. In addition to University Prep and other required courses, during sixth, seventh, and eighth grades, each student chooses one elective course per semester. In ninth and tenth grades students take a year-long elective, while in eleventh and twelfth they choose two-year-long electives. Electives have included robotics, engineering, drama, students' union (known as Associated Student Body or ASB), journalism, publications, music, music technology, and public speaking. In 12th grade, each student completes a three-part senior wheel course, which includes a course on service learning, a research seminar leading to a senior thesis, and an internship on the UCSD campus.

A significant portion of Preuss students matriculate to four-year institutions of higher learning. In 2005, of the school's 75 graduates, 91 percent were accepted to a four-year college or university while the other 9 percent attended a community college. The class of 2007 surpassed these numbers when 96 percent of its members gained admission to four-year universities. In 2011, 95 percent of graduates were admitted to four-year universities with 79 percent of graduates matriculating to one. 19 percent of the class of 2011 attended a community college.

=== Schedule ===
Preuss uses a different schedule from most schools to make room for all the courses offered. Both the school year and school day are longer than normal. The school year is 198 days (compared with 180 days for traditional schools), and the school day is 396 minutes (compared with an average of 360 minutes for traditional schools). As a result, Preuss' annual instruction time is 74,669 minutes compared to SDUSD's average of 64,800 minutes. Preuss uses a block schedule that calls for four classes to meet on Monday and Wednesday ("A" day) and the other four to meet on Tuesday and Thursday ("B" day). Fridays rotate between the two "A" and "B" days. Each block lasts 90 minutes which is 30 more minutes than the average school day. During its early years, Preuss ran on a trimester system to match that of UCSD. In 2006, the school switched to a semester system.

=== Faculty ===
The tasks of the faculty members at Preuss extend beyond teaching. On Fridays, the teachers meet for two hours to discuss staff development, trends in education, and student work, and each teacher creates an annual portfolio to present to the rest of the faculty at the end of the year. Even though Preuss is a charter school, its faculty, including its teachers, resource specialists, and librarians, are represented by the University Council-AFT, a statewide union that represents non-tenured faculty and librarians on all the University of California campuses.

In addition to the faculty, Preuss students benefit from partnerships established between the school and UCSD. Each trimester, UCSD provides nearly 100 classroom tutors to Preuss through a university course on educational equity. Faculty instruction is also supplemented through the school's community mentor program, which pairs students with mentors, many of whom are UCSD faculty and staff.

=== Awards and rankings ===
Preuss had the highest "academic performance index" (API) in San Diego County as of 2005. In 2010, Preuss' API ranked 10th in the state of California. Its students' results in the Standardized Testing and Reporting (STAR) program, the California Standards Test (CST), and the University of California college preparatory (A–G) requirements were higher than those of other schools with similar student populations. These results led San Diego Magazine to name Preuss one of the city's great schools.

Preuss has also been the recipient of national recognition. Since 2007, Preuss has ranked as a top 50 high school in the rankings released by both Newsweek and U.S. News & World Report. Its highest ranking came in 2008 when it placed sixth in Newsweek's rankings. In 2011, Preuss placed 44th in the U.S. News & World Report rankings and 30th in the Newsweek rankings. Additionally, in 2011 and 2012 Newsweek selected Preuss as the most transformative high school in the nation. To compile the list, Newsweek took each school's score on the list of the top 500 American high schools and multiplied it by the percentage of students that qualified for free or reduced-price lunch, the most reliable and consistent metric of socio-economic status in American high schools.

Preuss has accumulated similar accolades from more education-focused institutions. In 2007, Preuss was one of 53 charter schools to receive the Center of Education Reform's Distinguished School status. In September 2010, U.S. Secretary of Education Arne Duncan announced that Preuss had been selected as one of the nation's Blue Ribbon Schools for 2010. In June 2012, the University of Southern California Center for Educational Governance, using a methodology focused not just on academic performance but also accountability and fiscal stability, ranked Preuss the best charter school in the state of California.

== Student life ==
=== Athletics ===
Preuss requires physical education through the tenth grade. Students may choose to opt-out and take another elective or try out for one of Preuss' five athletic teams. All Preuss teams compete in Division IV of the San Diego Section of the California Interscholastic Federation. Offered sports include soccer, basketball, and lacrosse for boys and girls, as well as volleyball for girls only. In addition, Varsity Squash is offered through Access Youth Academy (AYA). The only sport to play at the national level, the program holds 13 national titles.

=== Clubs ===
A majority of Preuss clubs and organizations meet after school until 5:20 p.m., when the late-activity buses take up to 256 students home. A large number of the clubs are science-related. Robotics is popular on the Preuss' campus, which has teams that compete in robotics-related events sponsored by For Inspiration and Recognition of Science and Technology (FIRST), as well as teams that compete in Botball games played by robots they have built.

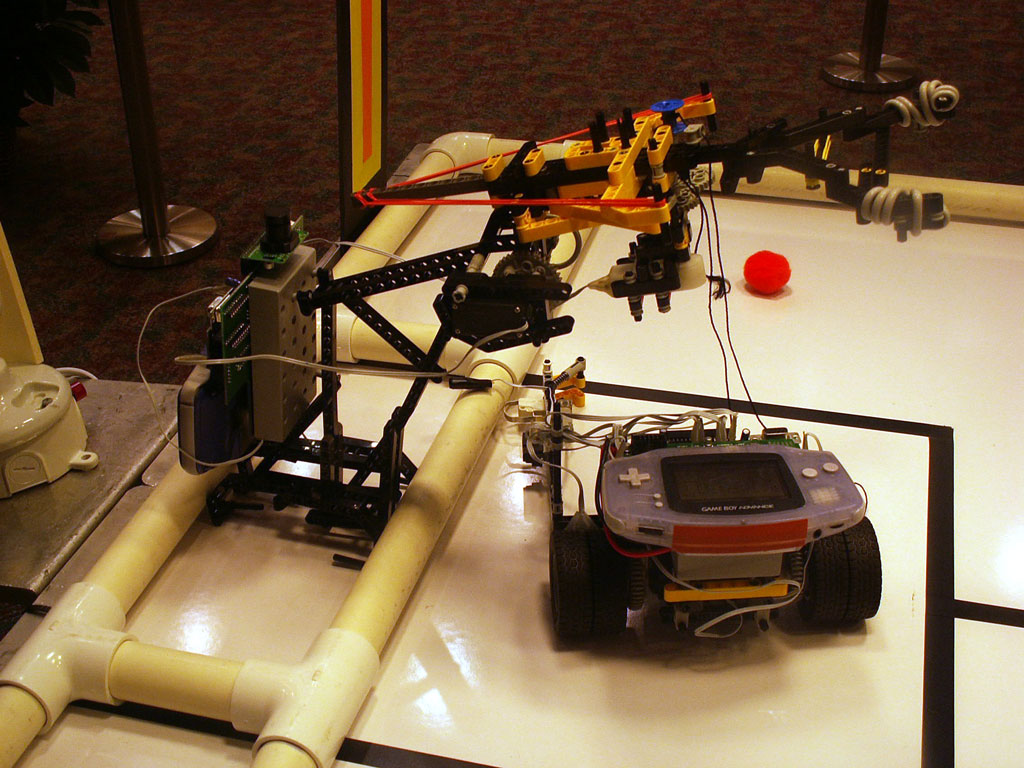
Preuss' Botball entry competing at the 2006 national tournament in Norman, Oklahoma

=== Internships ===
For four years running, the Preuss School has collaborated with the Sanford Burnham Prebys Medical Discovery Institute on an internship program. The internship program allows students to work on various projects at the Sanford Burnham laboratory, with the goal of inspiring students to become interested in science-related careers. The internship program is funded by Sanford Burnham Trustee Peter Preuss and his wife, Peggy, and Chair Wain Fishburn and his wife, Debby. Preuss also has long-standing relationships with various academics departments at UCSD. These departments accept Preuss students as interns as a part of the senior wheel elective.

== See also ==
- List of primary and secondary schools in San Diego
