= Jayson P. Ahern =

American politician

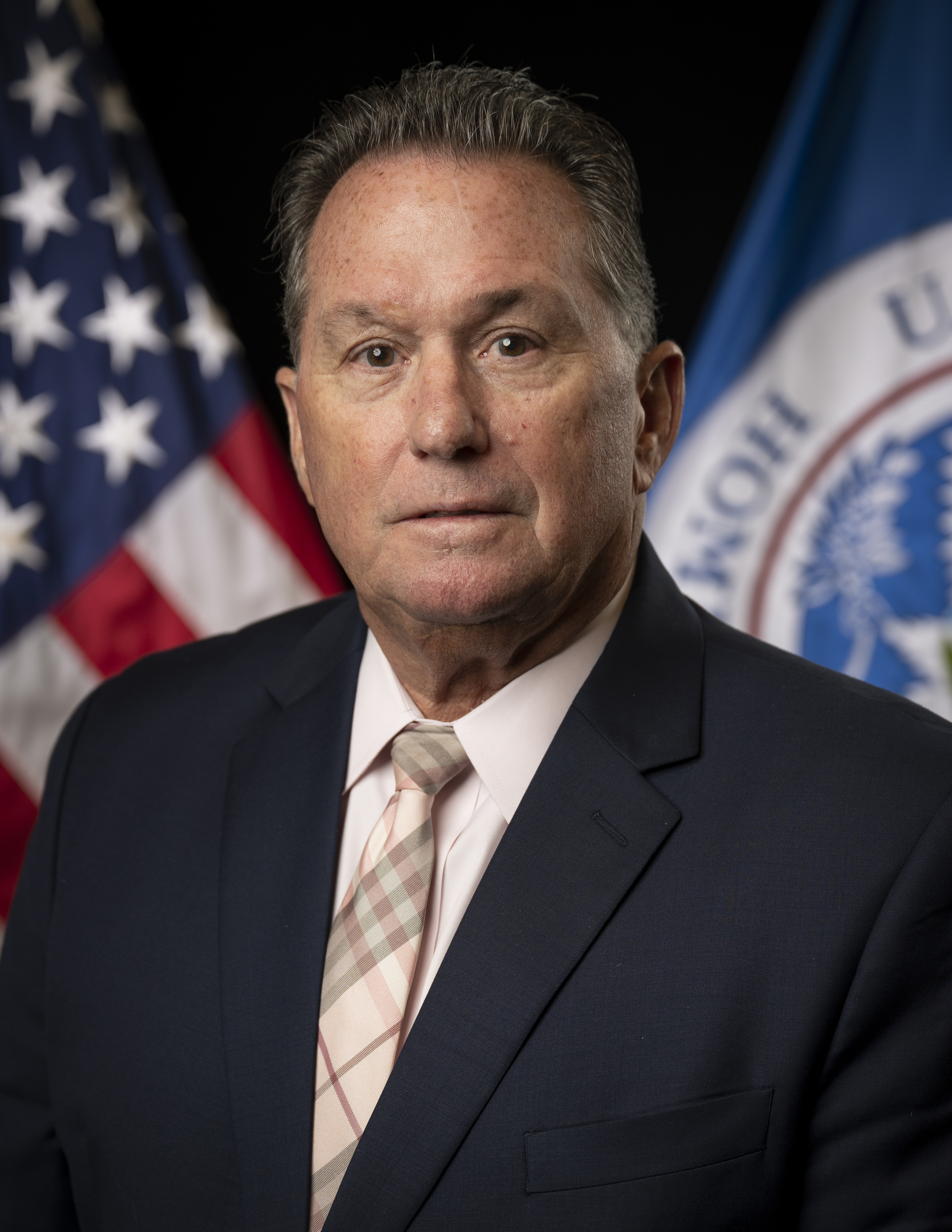
- Ahern in 2022

Commissioner of U.S. Customs and Border Protection
- Acting
- In office February 27, 2009 – March 10, 2010
- President: Barack Obama
- Preceded by: Ralph Basham
- Succeeded by: Alan D. Bersin (acting)

Jayson P. Ahern is the former Acting Commissioner of U.S. Customs and Border Protection from February 2009 to March 2010. He was Assistant Commissioner for Field Operations from March 2003 to August 2007. He managed an operating budget of $2.2 billion and directs the activities of more than 25,000 employees, including more than 19,000 CBP Officers and Agriculture Specialists, and oversees the programs and operations at 20 Field Operations offices, 317 ports of entry and 14 preclearance stations in Canada and the Caribbean. He was responsible for Immigration Policy and Programs that includes all immigration issues related to the admission and exclusion of aliens as well as the Agricultural Inspection at all Ports of Entry to protect the health of U.S. plant and animal resources and the facilitation of their movement in the global market place.

Additionally, he was responsible for Border Security and Facilitation, including Interdiction and Security, Passenger Operations, Targeting and Analysis and Canine Enforcement and for Trade Compliance and Facilitation which includes Cargo Entry and Release, Summary Operations, Trade Risk Management and Enforcement, and Seizures and Penalties as well as expanding Trade operations to focus on Anti-Terrorism.

Before the launch of the Department of Homeland Security on March 1, 2003, Ahern served in his current position with the legacy U.S. Customs Service since June 30, 2002. He was previously the Director, Field Operations, Southern California Customs Management Center from February 2001 to June 2002 where he was in charge of all Customs activity at the Southern California Ports of Entry. Prior to that, he was the principal field manager of Customs port operations in Los Angeles, California, and Miami, Florida. Ahern completed two earlier tours of duty at Customs Headquarters where he was the Director, Anti-Smuggling Division and Senior Advisor to the Acting Commissioner of Customs.

Ahern, a career member of the Senior Executive Service, is a graduate of Northeastern University. He has also completed intensive programs at Harvard University's John F. Kennedy School of Government and the Federal Executive Institute in Charlottesville, Virginia.

On November 23, 2009 Ahern announced his upcoming retirement from the Federal Government after 33 years of Federal Service. His retirement became effective in March 2010, when Alan Bersin succeeded Ahern as CBP's commissioner.

In March 2022 he was appointed to the Homeland Security Advisory Council by Secretary of Homeland Security Alejandro Mayorkas
