= Douglas J. Barrett =

American academic

Douglas Barrett
- Education: BS.c University of South Florida; MD. University of South Florida College of Medicine
- Scientific career
- Fields: Medicine
- Workplaces: University of Florida; J. Hillis Miller Health Science Center

Douglas John Barrett is the former senior vice president for the J. Hillis Miller Health Science Center at the University of Florida. He held the position from 2002 to 2009. As the senior vice president, he was responsible for an $850 million budget. He is a member of the American Board of Pediatrics and was the vice chairman of the Shands Health Care Board of Directors.

== Career ==
Barrett joined the faculty at the University of Florida's College of Medicine in 1980. From there, he was promoted to associate professor and chief of the Division of Pediatric Immunology from 1987 until 1991 when he was appointed chair of pediatrics and Nemours eminent scholar in pediatrics. In honor of his tenure as chairman, the Douglas J. Barrett, MD Academic Fellowship Award was created support clinical fellows in training. Barrett stepped down as chairman in 2002, as he was promoted to vice president for Health Affairs. He stayed in his role as vice president until 2009.

Preceded by Dr. Kenneth Berns	Vice President of the HSC; 2002 – 2009	Succeeded by David S. Guzick
