= Harold Kosoff =

American inventor

- Born: November 5, 1930; Philadelphia, Pennsylvania
- Died: March 12, 1995 (aged 64); Burlington, New Jersey
- Occupation: Inventor

Harold Kosoff (November 5, 1930 – March 12, 1995) was an inventor. He is credited with inventing the free piston engine and the battery-powered baby swing. U.S. Pat. No. 4,448,410 Exclusive rights for the battery-powered baby swing were sold to Graco. In addition, Kosoff invented a home air cleaner and chainless bicycle using an arc and pulley system.
