= Gompers Preparatory Academy =

Coordinates: 32°42′57.51″N 117°5′34.75″W

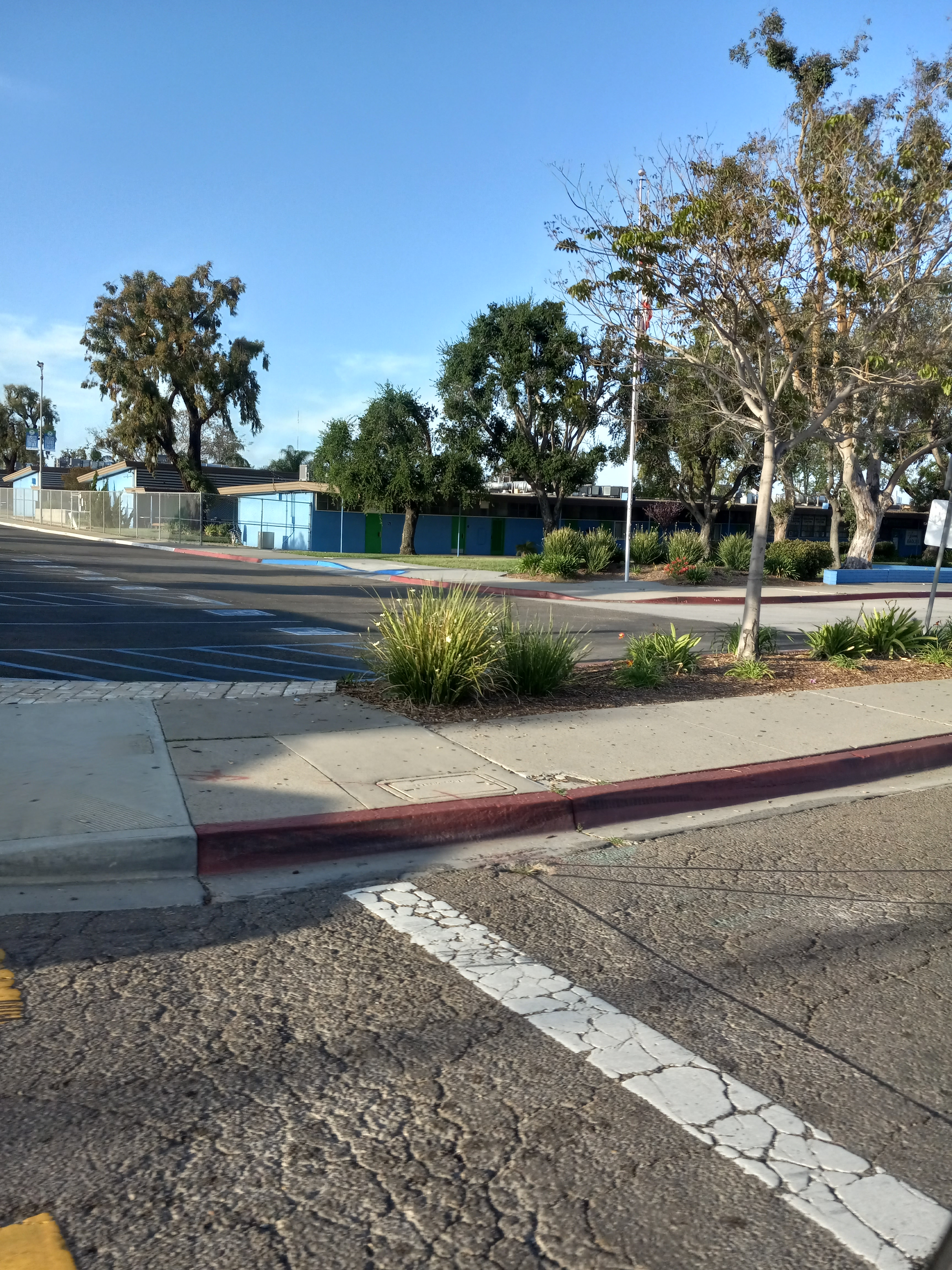

Location
- 1005 47th St; 1005 47th St., San Diego CA 92102; San Diego, CA 92114; United States

Information
- Former names: Gompers Middle School; Gompers Charter Middle School; Gompers Secondary School
- School type: Public Charter
- Motto: Per Discipulus Primoris (By the First Disciple)
- School district: San Diego Unified School District
- Director: Vincent Riveroll
- Faculty: 79.28 (FTE)
- Grades: 6–12
- Enrollment: 1,320 (2018-19)
- Student to teacher ratio: 16.65
- Colors: Green, blue
- Nickname: Gompers Eagles
- Website: Official website

Gompers Preparatory Academy (GPA, Gompers Prep, or simply Gompers) is a public charter secondary school in San Diego, California, operated under San Diego Unified School District in cooperation with the University of California, San Diego. It is located in the neighborhood of Chollas View, one of the lowest-income neighborhoods of the city of southeastern San Diego.

The school serves grades 6–12 and has a student body of approximately 950. It was founded in 2005 as Gompers Charter Middle School; the high school was added in 2009 as Gompers Preparatory Academy and the school graduated its first class of seniors in 2012. The academy is accredited by the Western Association of Schools and Colleges.

== History ==
Gompers opened in 1955 as a junior high school, named after labor union leader Samuel Gompers.

During the early 1980s, Gompers was designated a math-science magnet school, as part of the school district's effort to integrate its schools in response to a 1977 court order, by attracting white students to predominantly minority schools. There were two separate educational programs at the school: a standard middle school program for students from the local neighborhood in grades 7 and 8 who then went to high schools elsewhere, and a grade 7-12 magnet school which attracted students from all over the district for its special emphasis on math and science. The magnet program recruited top teachers and became known for its high test scores and placement of students in prestigious colleges. It won dozens of national academic awards in science and social studies competitions. But neighborhood residents complained that the magnet program was not integrated into the school, that magnet students and neighborhood students had little contact, and that there was a strong racial disparity between students in the magnet and students in the "regular" program. Principal Marie Thornton set out in 1986 to change that culture by insisting on more integration of the programs and requiring magnet teachers to also teach classes to the non-magnet students. These changes were controversial and were supported by neighborhood parents but strongly resisted by parents of magnet students, as well as by teachers, many of whom had no training or experience teaching middle school students. By 1990 there was a 53% drop in voluntary white enrollment in the program, about half of the original magnet teachers had left for other schools, and the district identified "severe problems" at the school, including racial tension and gang violence.

By 2000 the math-science magnet had been closed and the schools had become Gompers Middle School and Gompers High School, which shared the campus. The schools were widely regarded as failing and even dangerous, as violence caused by clashes between local gangs was common. Vincent Riveroll came into this situation in 2004 as middle school principal, and together with a committed group of teachers and staff members, he "started the war to reclaim Gompers." He convened a committee of teachers and parents which began to push for a charter school. The proposal was strongly resisted by the school district, which at one point fired Riveroll as principal. But the committee persisted, UCSD joined the effort, and the district approved the charter school a few months later, with Riveroll returning as principal. Gompers Middle School became Gompers Charter Middle School. The charter middle school coexisted for two years with Gompers High School, which graduated its last class in June 2007. The high school campus was eventually taken over by the charter to become Gompers Preparatory Academy.

In 2014, Alan Bersin announced the Mildred and Arthur Bersin Scholarship, to be awarded to students from Gompers Preparatory Academy, Abraham Lincoln High School, and the Preuss School who are accepted into Harvard University.

== Curriculum ==
The school offers a rigorous high school college preparatory program of instruction, designed to prepare students for college. The academic program includes honors and Advanced Placement courses in history, math, science, and English. The curriculum is designed around the admission requirements for the University of California system. All students wear uniforms and discipline is strict.

== Sports ==
Students at the academy can compete in softball, baseball, crew, basketball, soccer, track, tennis, lacrosse, volleyball, swimming, golf, and cross country. Teams compete in their sports as the Gompers Eagles, formerly nicknamed the Wildcats.
