= Milton Koskoff =

American lawyer and politician (1907–1997)

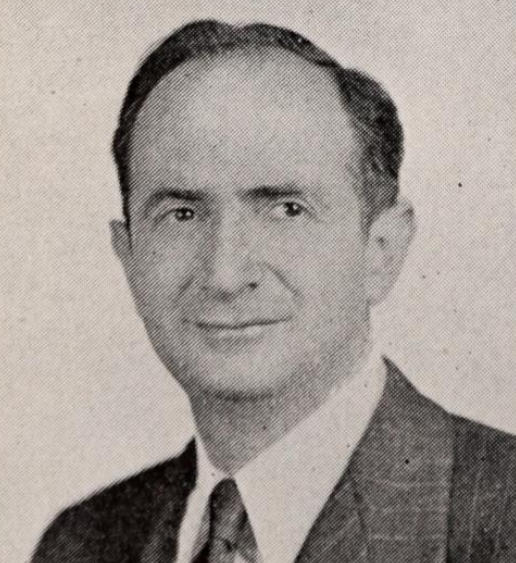
- Koskoff c. 1946

Member of the Connecticut House of Representatives from Plainville
- In office 1939–1947

Personal details
- Born: December 15, 1907
- Died: October 4, 1997 (aged 89)
- Party: Republican
- Spouse: Gertrude Koskoff (died 1993)
- Children: David Koskoff; Harriet Koskoff
- Education: Yale University; Yale Law School

Milton M. Koskoff (December 15, 1907 – October 4, 1997) was an American lawyer and politician from Connecticut. A Republican, he served as a member of the Connecticut House of Representatives, as an advisor to Governor of Connecticut John D. Lodge, and as a municipal judge in Plainville, Connecticut. He was married to Gertrude Koskoff and was the father of David Koskoff.

== Personal life ==
He was Jewish.
