= Seth Klarman =

American billionaire investor

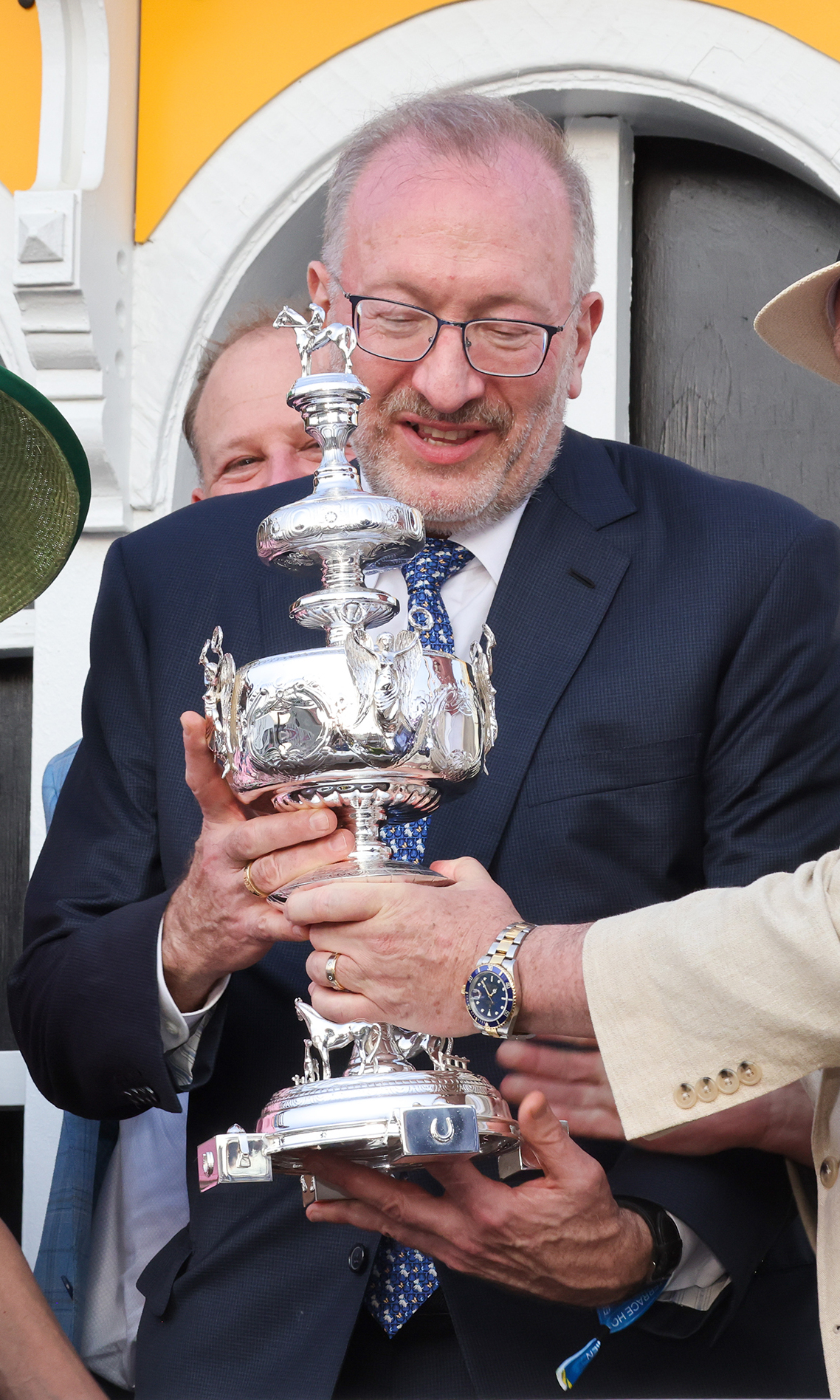
- Klarman holding the Woodlawn Vase during 2022 Preakness Stakes
- Born: May 21, 1957 (age 69); New York City, U.S.
- Education: Cornell University (AB); Harvard University (MBA)
- Occupation: Hedge fund manager
- Known for: Founder and CEO, Baupost Group
- Spouse: Beth Schultz (m. 1982)
- Children: 3
- Father: Herbert E. Klarman
- Relatives: Michael Klarman (brother)

Seth Andrew Klarman (born May 21, 1957) is an American billionaire investor, hedge fund manager, and author. He is a proponent of value investing. He is the chief executive and portfolio manager of the Baupost Group, a Boston-based private investment partnership he founded in 1982.

He closely follows the investment philosophy of Benjamin Graham and is known for buying unpopular assets while they are undervalued, seeking a margin of safety and profiting from any rise in price. Since his fund's $27 million-dollar inception in 1982, he has realized a 20% compounded return on investment. He manages $30 billion in assets.

In 2008, he was inducted into Institutional Investor Alpha's Hedge Fund Manager Hall of Fame. Forbes listed his personal fortune at US$1.3 billion and said he was the 15th highest earning hedge fund manager in the world in 2017. He has drawn numerous comparisons to fellow value investor Warren Buffett, and akin to Buffett's notation as the "Oracle of Omaha," Klarman has been called the "Oracle of Boston."

== Early life ==
Klarman was born on May 21, 1957, in New York City from a Jewish family. When he was six, he moved to the Mt. Washington area of Baltimore, Maryland, near the Pimlico Race Course. His father, Herbert E. Klarman, was a public health economist at Johns Hopkins University and his mother was a psychiatric social worker His parents divorced shortly after their moving to Baltimore.

When he was four years old, he redecorated his room to match a retail store putting price tags on all of his belongings and gave an oral presentation to his fifth-grade class about the logistics of buying a stock. As he grew older, he had a variety of small-time business ventures including a paper route, a snow cone stand, a snow shoveling business, and sold stamp-coin collections on the weekends. When he was 10 years old he purchased his first stock, one share of Johnson & Johnson (the stock split three-for-one and over time tripled his initial investment). His reasoning behind buying a share of Johnson & Johnson was that he had used a lot of band-aids (a product of the company) during his earlier years. At age 12 he was regularly calling his broker to get stock quotes.

== Education ==
Klarman attended Cornell University in Ithaca, New York, and was interested in majoring in mathematics but instead chose to pursue economics. He graduated magna cum laude in economics with a minor in history in 1979. He was a member of the Delta Chi fraternity. In the summer of his junior year, he interned at the Mutual Shares fund and was introduced to Max Heine and Michael Price. After graduating from college, he went back to the company to work for 18 months before deciding to go to business school. He went on to attend Harvard Business School where he was a Baker Scholar and was classmates with Jeffrey Immelt, Steve Burke, Stephen Mandel, James Long, and Jamie Dimon.

== Career ==
=== Investment ===
After graduating from business school in 1982, he founded the Baupost Group with Harvard Professor William J. Poorvu and partners Howard H. Stevenson, Jordan Baruch and Isaac Auerbach. The name is an acronym based on the founders' names (the name was decided on before Klarman joined the project). Poorvu asked Klarman and his associates to manage some money he had raised from the selling of his share in a local television station and the fund was started with US$27 million in startup capital. His starting salary was $35,000 a year, considered low to alternative job offers, and he later recalled that the other founders "were taking a big risk on a relatively inexperienced person." Early on in his investment career, he used to badger Goldman Sachs salesmen with so many questions regarding their options and thoughts on the markets that they were afraid to pick up the phone if they saw that Baupost was calling.

In February 2008, Klarman was alerted that a London-based hedge fund, Peloton Partners, were forced to liquidate more than a billion dollars' worth of their assets, he decided to open up his fund to new investors subsequently raising $4 billion in capital, mainly from large foundations and Ivy League endowments. He believed that there was serious market opportunity for value investors in the coming months and after the collapse of AIG and Lehman Brothers, he invested heavily in the equity markets, sometimes buying $100 million in stocks and other assets per day. While the market was down due to the aftermath of the crisis, he purchased many distressed securities and bonds. By early 2009, after JPMorgan Chase acquired Washington Mutual as a part of their deal with the United States Department of the Treasury, Sallie Mae bonds were returning double digit figures for Baupost. Overall, Klarman's bond position appreciated 25%, however, during the 2008 financial crisis, his fund returned -7% to -13%. Although many hedge funds faced negative returns and low performance during the crisis and its aftermath, Klarman saw increased equity positions and described it as a "fortuitous time" for the fund's capital gains. The same year he would go on to buy a minority share in the Boston Red Sox, via a stake in Ed Eskandarian.

In 2009, Klarman began buying distressed credits during the 2008 financial crisis. He purchased the bonds of CIT Group, a financial holding company based in New York City at 65 cents on the dollar with a yield rate of 15%. After the company went into prepared bankruptcy, as Baupost began lending it money via a loan, Carl Icahn gave a loan of $6 billion to the CIT Group but backed out of the deal a week later. This caused the bonds to speed into prepared bankruptcy and gave the Baupost group securities valued at 80 cents to the dollar for their debt in CIT Group. Shortly after the CIT deal was finalized, Klarman amassed a stake in a new bio-tech company called FacetBiotech, at an average cost of $9 a share. At the time, FacetBiotech had $17 a share in net cash. Klarman noted that when stocks are spun off of their larger parent companies they become "cheap and ignored." When Biogen eventually tried a hostile takeover of the company bidding up the price to $14 a share, Abbott Laboratories asked for a $27 per share settlement for acquisition. Klarman's fund finished that year up +27%.

As of 2016, the fund had US$31 billion in assets under management. In 2020 Seth Klarman's largest holding is eBay with a value of US$1.48 billion.

=== Investment philosophy ===
Klarman is a known proponent of value investing, and has stated that he has known he was one since junior year of college at age 25. During an interview at Harvard Business School, he stated: "It turns out that value investing is something that is in your blood. There are people who just don't have the patience and discipline to do it, and there are people who do. So it leads me to think it's genetic."

When asked what drives his fund's overall investment strategy and how value investing fits into the capital markets he replied:

Firstly, Value investing is intellectually elegant. You're basically buying bargains. It also appeals because all the studies demonstrate that it works. People who chase growth, who chase high fliers, inevitably lose because they paid a premium price. They lose to the people who have more patience and more discipline. Third, it's easy to talk in the abstract, but in real life you see situations that are just plain mispriced, where an ignored, neglected, or abhorred company may be just as attractive as others in the same industry. In time, the discount will be corrected, and you will have the wind at your back as a holder of the stock.

Klarman has been an avid supporter of the teachings of Benjamin Graham, and during the 2008 financial crisis criticized the short-term thinking of other fund managers, he believes that the "this-time-is-different" mindset will give a false sense of security to investors, and they ought to look at the bigger picture. He stresses the utility in the economy's business cycles and their predestined and perpetual self-corrective tendency. Klarman is known to sit on 30% to 50% of his funds in cash as to avoid unfavorable market conditions and only buys stocks he thinks have a suitable mispricing.

He makes unusual investments, buying unpopular assets while they are undervalued, using complex derivatives, and buying put options. During his first years running Baupost, he made it a point to only invest in companies that were not widely accepted by the Wall Street community; he stressed managing risk and using the margin of safety. He is a very conservative investor, and often holds a significant amount of cash in his investment portfolios, sometimes in excess of 50% of assets. Despite his unconventional strategies, he has consistently achieved high returns. Klarman looks for companies that are traded at a discount (so he can assume shares with a margin of safety). Klarman and his fund usually go "bargain hunting," when companies are distressed or face low growth or declining years. In 2015, when energy stocks were declining, his firm "started looking for deals." According to Institutional Investor, "[Klarman] has succeeded by deftly exploiting under-valued markets whether they are in equities, junk bonds, bankruptcies, foreign bonds or real estate."

In a 2011 interview with Charlie Rose, Klarman states he does not use a Bloomberg Terminal (an almost ubiquitous computer system used in major U.S. financial companies to track market data). Klarman stated due to his long-term strategy he is mostly uninterested in daily price fluctuations.

=== Horse racing ===
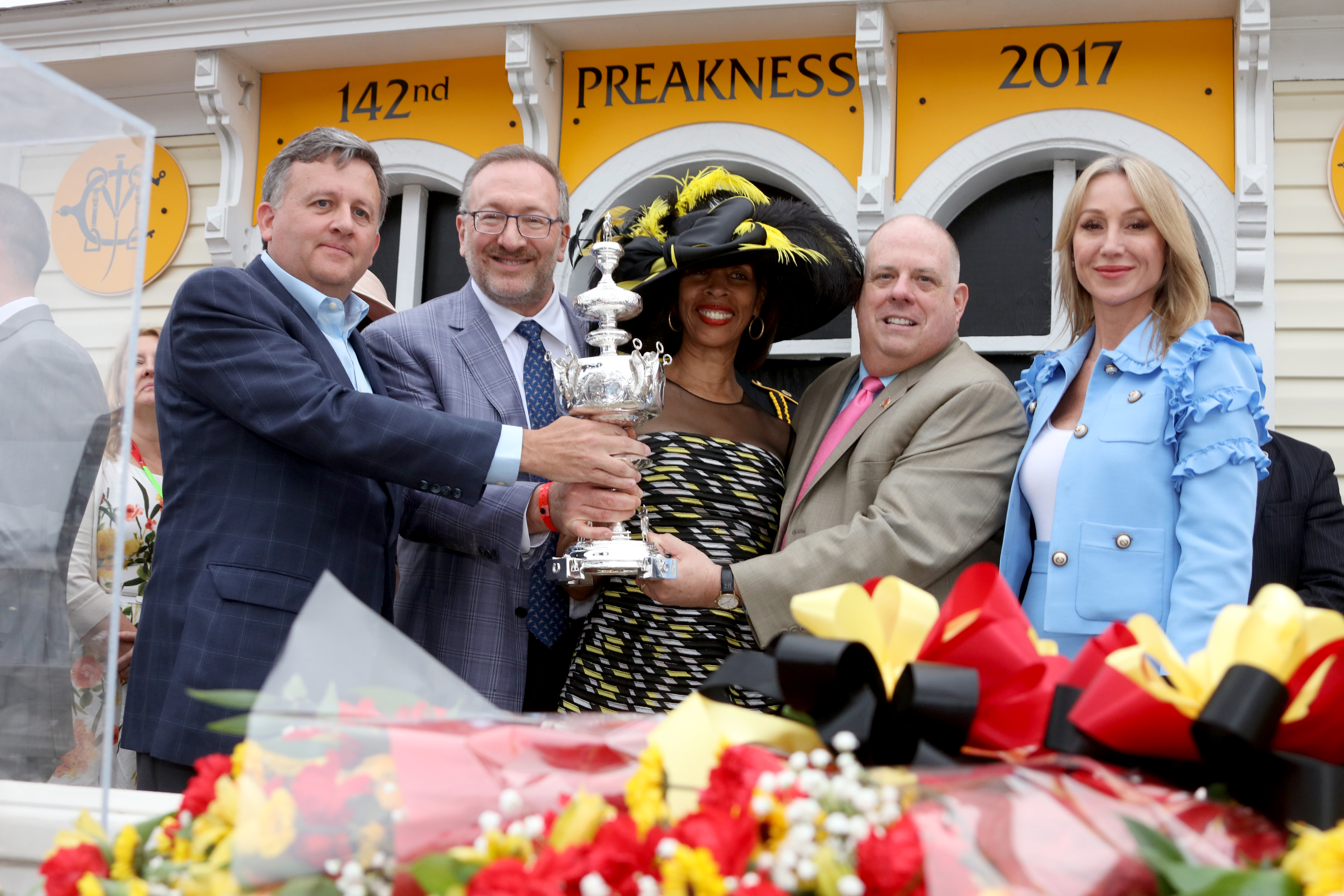
Klarman (second from left) and William Lawrence pose with the Governor of Maryland after winning the Preakness Stakes.

Klarman owns Klaravich Stables Inc. and has been racing horses with William Lawrence since 2006. Their horse, Cloud Computing, won the 2017 Preakness Stakes. In 2019, Klarman and Lawrence won the Outstanding Owner category at the Eclipse Awards, mainly due to the incredible season for their horse Bricks and Mortar that was voted the Eclipse Award as American Horse of the Year. In 2022 the stable won the Preakness Stakes on Seth Klarman's 65th birthday with their lightly raced horse Early Voting.

== Personal life ==
Klarman typically keeps a low profile, rarely speaking in public or granting interviews. He lives in Chestnut Hill, Massachusetts, with his wife, Beth Schultz Klarman, whom he met on a Boston Harbor cruise in 1982; they have three children. His brother, Michael Klarman, is a professor at Harvard Law School.

Klarman was one of the founding board members of the Broad Institute in 2009. He was appointed chairman of the board on July 17, 2025, after former chairman Eric Schmidt stepped down.

== Political and economic views ==
Klarman has donated to both Democratic and Republican groups and candidates while being registered an independent voter. Since the election of Donald Trump in 2016, he has donated almost exclusively to Democrats. He has also given extensively to philanthropic causes through the Klarman Family Foundation, which he runs with his wife. The foundation has $700 million in assets as of 2018 and gave away $40 million in 2016. It focuses on pro-democracy initiatives, such as supporting groups that protect journalists, fight against bigotry, and advocate for LGBTQ rights.

Klarman is a major backer of political non-profits such as the Ending Spending Fund and the pro-same-sex marriage American Unity Fund. He has stated: "I'm a complicated guy, I'm fairly nuanced in my views. I'm trying to do what I think is the right thing for the country."

In the 2016 presidential election, he gave the maximum donation of $5,400 to Hillary Clinton's campaign, stating that "Donald Trump is completely unqualified for the highest office in the land."

After the inauguration of President Trump to his first term in office, Klarman released a highly circulated (but internal) letter to members of his fund that denounced the upcoming investing climate. The letter states:

Exuberant investors have focused on the potential benefits of stimulative tax cuts, while mostly ignoring the risks from America-first protectionism and the erection of new trade barriers. President Trump may be able to temporarily hold off the sweep of automation and globalization by cajoling companies to keep jobs at home, but bolstering inefficient and uncompetitive enterprises is likely to only temporarily stave off market forces.

Although Klarman gave $2.9 million to Republican candidates in 2016, he told The New York Times in September 2018, "One of the reasons I’m willing to come out of my shell and talk to you is because I think democracy is at stake, and maybe I’ll be able to convince some other people of that, and get them to support Democrats in 2018." Klarman, who was previously one of the biggest donors to the Republican Party in New England, told the Times in September 2018, that he had already contributed almost $5 million to nearly 150 candidates, including Representative Joe Kennedy III, Senate candidate Representative Beto O'Rourke and Senator Kirsten Gillibrand. Klarman is a registered Independent who reasoned, "We need to turn the House and Senate as a check on Donald Trump and his runaway presidency." He commented that he feels "betrayed" by "spineless" Republicans who have been "profiles in cowardice," and believes the only option is to "act as a check and balance."

Klarman along with investor and Hyatt heir John Pritzker and LinkedIn cofounder Reid Hoffman were among the donors to the anti-Trump Republican Accountability Project.

According to Dennis C. Jett, "Klarman contributes to the Foundation for the Defense of Democracies, the Middle East Media Research Institute, the Middle East Forum, and the David Project. Klarman, believing the coverage of Israel in Israeli newspapers was biased, started his own called Times of Israel," of which he is chairman.

== Wealth ==
Forbes lists his personal fortune at US$1.3 billion as of January 2025. In 2017, he was listed as the 15th highest earning hedge fund manager in the world.

== Philanthropy ==
Klarman started the Klarman Family Foundation, which donates to medical causes, Jewish organizations (such as the American Jewish Committee, Boston's Combined Jewish Philanthropies and Gann Academy), and Israeli causes. Klarman is the chairman of Facing History and Ourselves, which develops classroom programs to combat antisemitism and bigotry. Klarman also is active with the Israel Project, a pro-Israel advocacy group that collects and provides information on Israel for journalists. He donated $4 million to the organization between 2008 and 2010. He is the key U.S. investor behind The Times of Israel, an online English-language newspaper which reports on Israel, the region and the Jewish world.

In 2013, Klarman donated the lead capital to fund the $61 million building at Cornell University named the Seth '79 and Beth Klarman Humanities Building, more simply known as Klarman Hall. A year later, he donated money to Harvard Business School to construct a "conference center/auditorium and performance space," named Klarman Hall. It opened in 2018. In 2019, Cornell University announced that Klarman had donated significant funds to help establish a new postdoctoral fellowship program at the school, the Klarman Fellowships.

== Awards ==
Klarman has been called a "hedge fund titan," and a "quiet giant of investing," for his slow accumulation of fund capital over his career (in 2008, his hedge fund was the 6th largest in the world) and low profile. It was reported by Andrew Ross Sorkin, of The New York Times, that "[Klarman] is the most successful and influential investor you have probably never heard of." Investopedia calls him "an enigma in the investing world."

He is sometimes called "the Warren Buffett of his generation," and the "Oracle of Boston." According to The New York Times, Buffett has publicly praised Klarman's investing, and it has been reported that Buffett keeps a copy of his book on his bookshelf.

In 2008, he was inducted into Institutional Investors Alpha's Hedge Fund Manager Hall of Fame along with Alfred Jones, Bruce Kovner, David Swensen, George Soros, Jack Nash, James Simons, Julian Roberston, Kenneth Griffin, Leon Levy, Louis Bacon, Michael Steinhardt, Paul Tudor Jones and Steven A. Cohen.

== Publications and works ==
Klarman has written many annual letters to shareholders but has kept a limited role in writing articles, op-eds or books. In 1991, Klarman published his only book, Margin of Safety: Risk Averse Investing Strategies for the Thoughtful Investor (1991), a reflection of value investing found in his hedge fund. In the book, he outlines the various issues with retail investing, and critiques small time investors getting into the market purely using metrics such as share price momentum and losing money in the long run. He issues that this is speculation and at times gambling and should be discouraged in the marketplace. The book asserts that more people should follow the principles of value investing or people who invest in stocks that trade below their underlying value so as to purchase them at a discount.

The book had amassed a cult following. Due to "only 5,000 copies [being sold]," the book is out of print and has become a relic in the finance community. Originally the book was priced at $25 a copy, however, due to it being out of print, it has a market price of $700 for used versions with newer copies going for $2,500 to $4,000. University libraries report the book as "one of their most wait-listed titles as well as one most claimed as lost." Klarman has thought of bringing the book back, but only for a charity event.

He edited the 6th edition of Benjamin Graham and David Dodd's Security Analysis in 2008.

== See also ==
- List of Cornell University alumni
- List of Harvard University people
- Warren Buffett and Charlie Munger, fellow value investors
