= David S. Guzick =

American endocrinologist (born 1952)

- Born: May 21, 1952 (age 74); New York, New York
- Education: New York University, B.A. (1972); New York University, M.D. (1979); New York University, Ph.D. (1979)
- Occupation: Senior Vice President of Health Affairs
- Employer(s): University of Pittsburgh; University of Rochester; University of Florida; LSU Health Shreveport
- Spouse: Donna E. Giles

David S. Guzick (born May 21, 1952) an American reproductive endocrinologist and economist. He served as Senior Vice President for Health Affairs and President of UF Health at the University of Florida from 2009 to 2018, and is Emeritus Dean of the University of Rochester School of Medicine and Dentistry.

== Early life and education ==
David S. Guzick was born in New York City and raised in Brighton Beach, Brooklyn. He graduated from Abraham Lincoln High School and received a bachelor's degree from New York University, majoring in economics and mathematics. He was admitted to the Medical Scientist Training Program at New York University, receiving his M.D. in 1979 as well as his Ph.D. in economics.

== Career ==
Dr. Guzick completed a residency in Obstetrics and Gynecology at the Johns Hopkins Hospital, followed by a fellowship in reproductive endocrinology at the University of Texas, Southwestern Medical School. In 1986, Guzick was recruited to the University of Pittsburgh as Director of Reproductive Endocrinology in the department of Obstetrics and Gynecology, where he remained until 1995. From there he was recruited to the University of Rochester as the Henry A. Thiede Chair of Obstetrics and Gynecology from 1995 - 2002. He was then appointed Dean of the University of Rochester School of Medicine and Dentistry from 2002 through 2009.

On July 1, 2009, Dr. Guzick was appointed as Senior Vice President of Health Affairs at the University of Florida, and President of UF Health, also serving as Chair of the Board of UF Health Shands Hospital. On July 1, 2018, Guzick stepped down from these roles, citing changing priorities after fighting cancer. At that time, citing several “significant accomplishments” during Dr. Guzick’s tenure, the President of the University of Florida stated that his “leadership over the past nine years has been transformative. He has created a culture of excellence and defined a vision for the future that has inspired our entire university. Rather than settling for regional excellence, he has led UF Health toward national leadership in research, education, and patient care.”

Dr. Guzick is recognized in the field of reproductive medicine for mathematical and statistical models of clinical outcomes and for research in polycystic ovary syndrome, endometriosis and infertility that changed clinical practice. He was Principal Investigator for the University of Rochester Clinical and Translational Research Award, one of the first 12 universities to receive this grant from the National Institutes of health. In 2004, Guzick was inducted into the Johns Hopkins Society of Scholars and in 2008 was elected to the Institute of Medicine of the National Academy of Sciences (now National Academy of Medicine). His 2020 book, entitled “An Introduction to the US Health Care Industry: Balancing Care, Cost and Access,” is published by The Johns Hopkins University Press.

Preceded by Dr. Douglas J. Barrett	VP of Health Affairs at UF; 2009 – 2018	Succeeded by Dr. David Nelson
