= David Koskoff =

American lawyer and author (born 1939)

David E. Koskoff
- Born: 1939 (age 86–87)
- Education: Yale University
- Occupations: Lawyer, author
- Parent(s): Milton Koskoff; Gertrude Koskoff

David E. Koskoff (born 1939) is an American attorney and author.

Koskoff was born into a prominent Connecticut political family; both his parents, Milton and Gertrude, were members of the Connecticut General Assembly from the Republican Party, and Milton served as an advisor to Governor of Connecticut John D. Lodge.

Koskoff graduated from Yale University in 1961 and Yale Law School in 1964. He went into the private practice of law in Plainville, Connecticut where he also served as a member of the town council and as town attorney. As an author, his first published work was Joseph P. Kennedy: a Life and Times. The book was widely reviewed and was featured on the front page of the New York Review of Books. Koskoff later penned additional books, about the Mellon family, about Thomas J. Dodd, and about the diamond industry.

He is married to Charlotte, who was a Democratic Party-nominated candidate for United States Congress from Connecticut's 6th congressional district in 1994 and 1996.

== Works ==
- Koskoff, David (1974). Joseph P. Kennedy: a Life and Times. Prentice Hall. ISBN 0135111544.
- Koskoff, David (1978). The Mellons: The Chronicle of America's Richest Family. Ty Crowell. ISBN 0690011903.
- Koskoff, David (1981). The Diamond World. Harper Collins. ISBN 0060380055.
- Koskoff, David (2011). The Senator from Central Casting: The Rise, Fall, and Resurrection of Thomas J. Dodd. New American Political Press. ISBN 978-0615435848.
