= Canada Institute =

American-based think tank

The Canada Institute also called the Public Policy Forum (PPF) is a Washington D.C.–based think tank that serves as a forum for issues concerning U.S.-Canada bilateral relations through policy papers and research projects. The institute, which is a program of the Wilson Center, also contributes in shaping public policy discourse in Canada and the U.S.

== Background ==
The Canada Institute was founded in 1987 by the Woodrow Wilson International Center for Scholars to raise the level of awareness of Canada in the United States. It was established as a public policy forum that focuses on dialogue about the full spectrum of US-Canada issues. The aim is to enhance the understanding and knowledge about Canada, particularly among the policy community in Washington D.C., and to create new channels of communication among scholars, business leaders, NGOs, and policymakers. It is considered the largest policy research institute on Canadian affairs outside of Canada.

== Initiatives ==
The institute engages in research, which focuses on the following areas: contemporary Canada, US-Canadian relations, North American political economy, and Canada's role on the global stage. Specific areas of concern include energy, trade, the US-Canadian border, security challenges, regional economic integration, immigration, globalization, and environment, among others. An example of the institute's initiatives is the One Issue, Two Voices publication series, which involves dialogues between Canadian and American authors discussing the two countries’ bilateral relationship. A discussion on health care in 2008, for instance, involved Antonia Maioni and Theodore Marmor, who revealed the disparities in spending, coverage, and access for the two countries. Information from the series inform and help shape policies that affect US-Canadian relationship. Scholars of the institute also engage in research on subjects such as systemic financial risk.

Funding for the institute includes Congressionally-appropriated funds but the bulk of its revenue is sourced from fund-raising activities in Canada. Other sources include income from projects and the works of the institute's scholars as well as grants from the private sector and the Canadian embassy in Washington, D.C.

The institute's public policy scholars include Louis Belanger and James T. McHugh. Christopher Sands currently serves as the institute's director.
