= Gertrude Koskoff =

American politician (1911–1992)

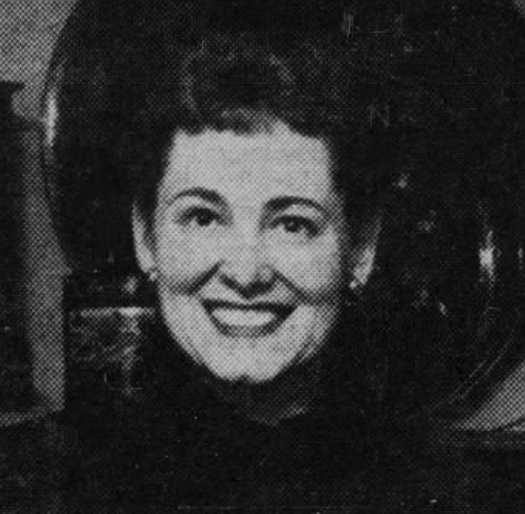
- Koskoff in 1953

Member of the Connecticut House of Representatives from Plainville
- In office 1953–1959 Serving with John A. Villardi
- Preceded by: Charles C. Taetsch; Clara Pratt
- Succeeded by: Robert P. Howard; Nora A. Powers

Personal details
- Born: Gertrude Farber; May 30, 1911 Worcester, Massachusetts, U.S.
- Died: November 12, 1992 (aged 81) Plainville, Connecticut, U.S.
- Resting place: Congregation Mishkan Israel Cemetery
- Party: Republican
- Spouse: Milton Koskoff
- Children: David Koskoff; Harriet Koskoff

Gertrude Farber Koskoff (May 30, 1911 – November 12, 1992) was an American politician who served in the Connecticut House of Representatives from 1953 to 1959, representing the town of Plainville as a Republican.

== Personal life ==
Koskoff was born Gertrude Farber in Worcester, Massachusetts, on May 30, 1911. She was married to lawyer and politician Milton Koskoff, who represented Plainville in the Connecticut House of Representatives from 1939 to 1947. Together, they had two children, Harriet and David Koskoff. She was Jewish.

== Career ==
=== Connecticut House of Representatives ===
A Republican, Koskoff was elected to the Connecticut House of Representatives in 1952 as one of two representatives from the town of Plainville. She served three terms alongside fellow Republican John A. Villardi and did not run for reelection in 1958. She and Villardi were succeeded by Robert P. Howard and Nora A. Powers in 1959.

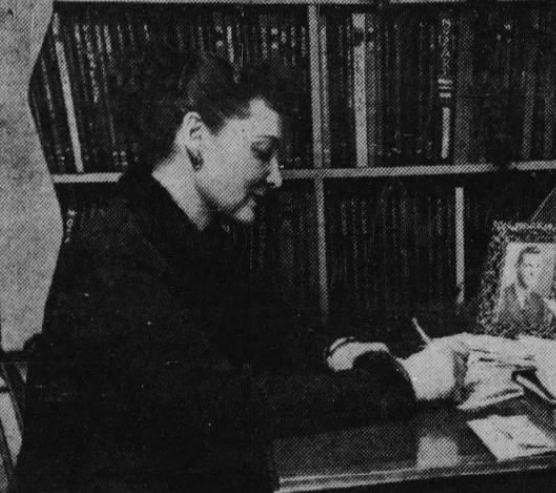
Koskoff in 1953

While serving in the House of Representatives, much of Koskoff's work was on prison reform and civil rights. Koskoff was recognized by the Connecticut Valley branch of the NAACP for legislation she introduced to broaden the definition of public accommodations. She advocated for the prison system to provide for the treatment of mentally impaired inmates, introduced legislation to reform Connecticut's probation system, and was internationally recognized in the field of penology. She was invited to speak at the International Conference on Criminology in England in 1955.

In July 1956, more than 200 inmates at Wethersfield State Prison staged a sit-in. In response, Governor Abraham A. Ribicoff appointed Koskoff and state Senator Joseph S. Longo to meet with the prison's board of directors to discuss prisoner grievances. The inmates had requested Koskoff's presence because of her interest in prison reform during her tenure.

=== Later career ===
Following her service in the House of Representatives, Koskoff served on the State Board of Parole. Originally appointed by Governor John N. Dempsey in 1968, she was reappointed by Governors Thomas Meskill, Ella Grasso, and William A. O'Neill. She retired in 1990, having served 22 years in the position.

== Death ==
Koskoff died of pancreatic cancer on November 12, 1992, in Plainville. She was 81. Koskoff was buried at Congregation Mishkan Israel Cemetery in New Haven, Connecticut.
