= Michael Klarman =

American historian

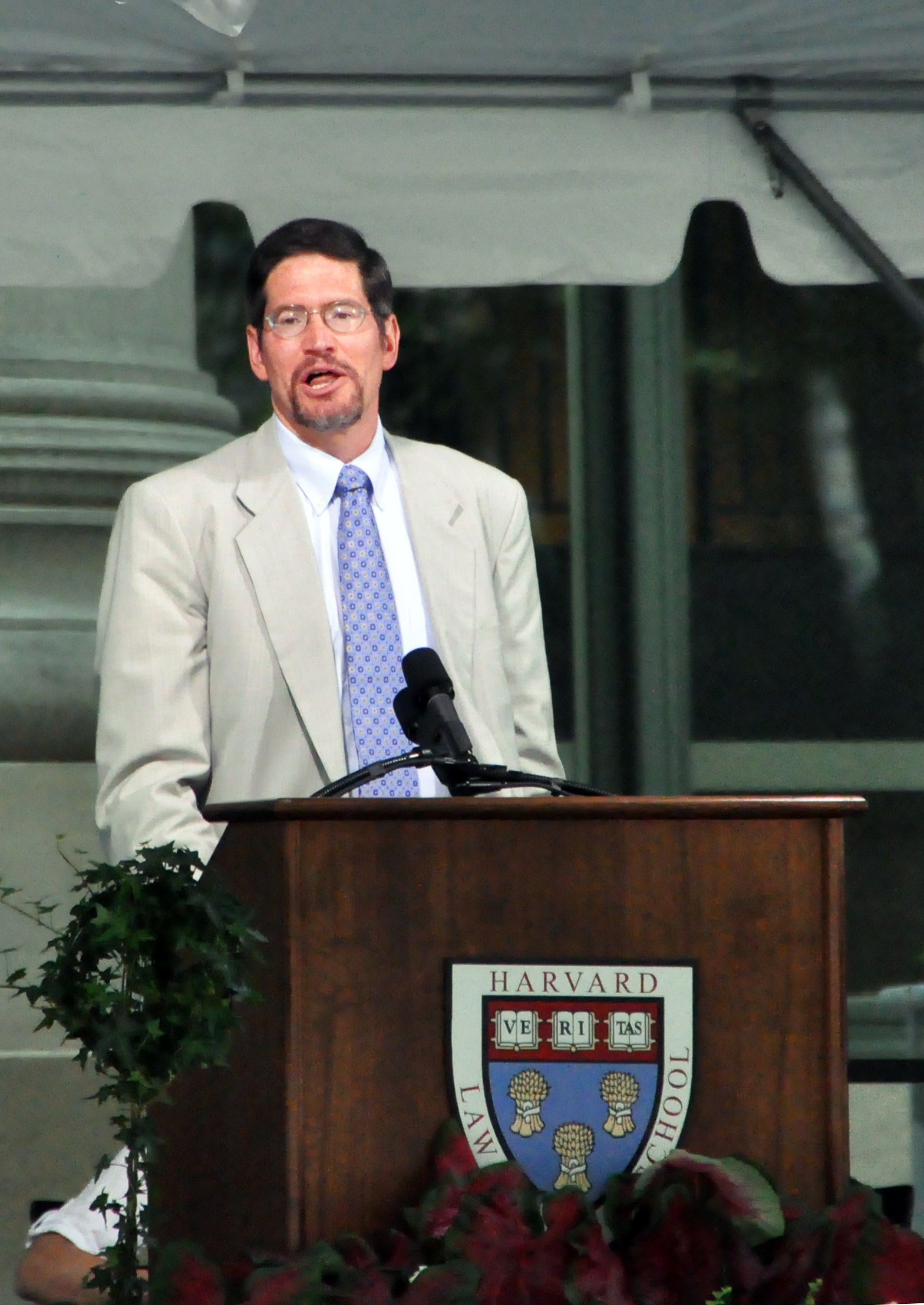
- Klarman speaking at Harvard Law Class Day 2010
- Born: Michael J. Klarman; 1959 (age 66–67)
- Education: University of Pennsylvania (BA, MA); Stanford Law School (JD); University of Oxford (DPhil)
- Occupations: Legal historian; scholar
- Father: Herbert E. Klarman
- Relatives: Seth Klarman (brother)
- Awards: Bancroft Prize (2005)

Michael J. Klarman (born 1959) is an American legal historian and scholar of constitutional law. Currently, Klarman is the Kirkland & Ellis Professor at Harvard Law School. Formerly, he was James Monroe Distinguished Professor of Law, Professor of History, and Elizabeth D. and Richard A. Merrill Research Professor at the University of Virginia School of Law.

== Early life and education ==
Klarman grew up in Baltimore, Maryland, in a Jewish family. His father, Herbert E. Klarman, was a public health economist. He is the brother of investor Seth Klarman.

Klarman holds a J.D. from Stanford Law School, a D.Phil. from Oxford University (where he was a Marshall Scholar) and an M.A. and B.A. from the University of Pennsylvania. His dissertation was titled "The Osborne Judgment: A Legal/Historical Analysis". After his graduation from law school, he clerked for then-Judge Ruth Bader Ginsburg when she was on the United States Court of Appeals for the District of Columbia Circuit.

== Scholarship ==
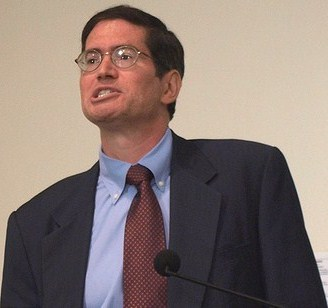
Klarman discusses the U.S. Constitution on its 222nd anniversary

Klarman specializes in the constitutional history of race. He contends that the Supreme Court of the United States has historically been hostile to the rights of minorities and has not consistently enforced constitutional protections for them. Klarman argues that civil rights protections arise out of social mores from which the court takes its cue.

Klarman has also defended political process theory as a method of constitutional interpretation.

== Awards ==
- 2005 Bancroft Prize

== Works ==
- Klarman, Michael J. (1994). "How Brown Changed Race Relations: The Backlash Thesis". The Journal of American History. 81 (1): 81–118. doi:10.2307/2080994. JSTOR 2080994. Preview.
- Discussion between Klarman and Michael W. McConnell regarding Brown v. Board of Education

- McConnell, Michael W. (May 1995). "Originalism and the desegregation decisions". Virginia Law Review. 81 (4): 947–1140. doi:10.2307/1073539. JSTOR 1073539.

- Response to McConnell: Klarman, Michael J. (October 1995). "Response: Brown, originalism, and constitutional theory: a response to Professor Mcconnell". Virginia Law Review. 81 (7): 1881–1936. doi:10.2307/1073643. JSTOR 1073643.

- Response to Klarman: McConnell, Michael W. (October 1995). "Reply: The originalist justification for Brown: a reply to Professor Klarman". Virginia Law Review. 81 (7): 1937–1955. doi:10.2307/1073644. JSTOR 1073644.

- Klarman, Michael J. (June 2002). "Is the Supreme Court sometimes irrelevant? Race and the Southern Criminal Justice System in the 1940s". The Journal of American History. 89 (1): 119–153. doi:10.2307/2700787. JSTOR 2700787.
- Klarman, Michael J. (2004). From Jim Crow to Civil Rights: The Supreme Court and the Struggle for Racial Equality. Oxford University Press. ISBN 9780195129038. Preview.
- Klarman, Michael J. (2007). Brown v. Board of Education and the Civil Rights Movement. New York: Oxford University Press. ISBN 978-0-19-530763-4. Preview.
- Klarman, Michael J. (2016). Unfinished Business: Racial Equality in American History. New York: Oxford University Press. ISBN 978-0-19-994203-9. Preview
- Klarman, Michael J. (October 14, 2016). The Framers' Coup: The Making of the United States Constitution. New York: Oxford University Press. ISBN 978-0-19-994203-9. Preview.
