= Brian Kosoff =

American photographer from New York (born 1957)

Brian Kosoff (born 1957) is an American photographer from New York who has worked as both a commercial and fine arts photographer.

== Early life ==
Kosoff was born in New York City and spent his early years in Brooklyn. His uncle, an amateur photographer, introduced him to photography when he was 15 years old. While in high school, he began an internship that allowed him to assist several Manhattan-based editorial and advertising photographers. During his subsequent studies at the School of Visual Arts, he continued to work as a photographer's assistant and was encouraged to bring his portfolio to newspapers and galleries. This resulted in assignments for the Village Voice and the first solo exhibition of his photography at Third Eye Gallery. The exhibition was noted on the "short list" in The New York Times for recommended shows. As a result, Kosoff left school to pursue photographic assignments, the first of which was for New York magazine.

== Commercial career ==
Starting in the late seventies, Kosoff worked for magazines, corporate clients and advertising agencies. After a 25-year career in commercial work, Kosoff embarked on a very different path that he found more rewarding. In the late nineties he made a trip to Death Valley and Kosoff, enamored by the sand dunes and mountains of California, was intrigued by the peace and serenity they conveyed. He began attempting to capture in images both the landscapes he saw and the mood they invoked. That became his life's work and, in 2002, Kosoff closed his commercial studio in Manhattan.

== Fine art photography ==
In 2002 Kosoff left his commercial career to devote himself to the production of personal work; he subsequently had exhibitions throughout the United States.

In addition to writing articles for magazines and newspapers, he has been interviewed and featured in a variety of publications. Kosoff states, "While photography is inherently a two-dimensional medium, incorporating only height and width, I work to include two other dimensions: depth and time.” A critic for the Dallas Morning News similarly noted that his images are "example[s] of two-dimensional work that operate with magic akin to the three-dimensional shimmer of rolling mercury."

His skills learned while producing projects for commercial clients carried over into his work photographing landscapes. He began applying methodical precision to work he found moving on an emotional level. He uses early-morning light and a minimalist sensibility to document his travels in North America and Europe.

Joe Farace, spoke about Kosoff's work in a 2012 edition of Shutterbug Magazine.
