= Kossoff =

Kossoff is a Russian surname, also used by Russian Jews. It is derived from Russian word "kos" meaning blackbird. Variants of the name are Kossov, Kosov, Kossow. Notable people with the surname include:

- Adam Kossoff, British filmmaker and artist
- David Kossoff (1919–2005), British actor, father of Paul Kossoff
- Leon Kossoff (1926–2019), British expressionist painter
- Paul Kossoff (1950–1976), British rock guitarist
