= List of Himachal Pradesh cricketers =

This is a list of cricketers who have played first-class, List A or Twenty20 cricket for the Himachal Pradesh cricket team.

== A ==
- Kaunik Acharya
- Ankit Aggarwal
- Deepak Agnihotri
- Amandeep
- Rohit Awasthy

== B ==
- Manu Bhardwaj (Note: Born in 1975, Bhardwaj was a leg-break bowler.)

== C ==
- Akshay Chauhan

== D ==
- Navalkishore Dogra

== J ==
- Ayush Jamwal

== M ==
- Jitender Mehra

== S ==
- Tikam Singh
