= Aggarwal =

Aggarwal is a surname. See List of Agrawals.

Notable people with the surname include:

- Aarthi Aggarwal (active from 2001), Indian actress who primarily acts in Telugu films
- Amol Aggarwal (born 1993), American mathematician and mathematical physicist
- Ankit Aggarwal (born 1983), Indian cricketer
- Anu Aggarwal (born 1969), Indian model and film actress
- Bharat Aggarwal, Indian-American biochemist
- Faqir Chand Aggarwal (1932–2024), Indian politician
- Jai Bhagwan Aggarwal (born 1952), Indian politician
- Jai Parkash Aggarwal (born 1944), Indian politician
- K. K. Aggarwal (born 1948), Indian electronic and communications engineer and IT specialist
- K. K. Aggarwal (cardiologist) (born before 1979), Indian cardiologist
- Kajal Aggarwal (born 1985), Indian actress who primarily acts in Telugu and Tamil films
- Mira Aggarwal (born 1961), Indian politician
- Neha Aggarwal (born 1990), Indian female Olympic table tennis player
- Pramod Agarwal, Indian businessman
- Raj Aggarwal (born before 1958), Indian author and contributor to the fields of finance and international business studies
- Raj K Aggarwal (born 1949), pharmacist, public health specialist, businessman and first Honorary Consul for India in Wales
- Rakesh Aggarwal (born 1975), British businessman
- Sudarshan K. Aggarwal (born 1935), Indian physician and radiologist
- Vinod Aggarwal (born 1953), American academic political scientist
- Radhika Aggarwal, Indian entrepreneur
