= Sonia Aggarwal =

American engineer and policy advisor

Sonia Aggarwal is an engineer and policy advisor, who served as the special assistant to president Joe Biden for Climate Policy, Innovation, and Deployment. Starting as a senior advisor when the President was inaugurated and serving through the end of 2022, her appointment was understood by the media to be a signal of the Biden administration's seriousness in pursuing ambitious clean energy policy. She is credited with helping to set the U.S. greenhouse gas emissions target of 50-52% reductions by 2030, as well as contributing heavily to the design of Build Back Better, which passed Congress as the Bipartisan Infrastructure Law and the Inflation Reduction Act. She also co-chaired the Climate Innovation Working Group, alongside the Office of Management and Budget and the Office of Science and Technology Policy.

== Early life and education ==
Aggarwal was born in South Carolina and grew up in Ohio, attending Laurel School and graduating from Hawken School in 2002. Aggarwal completed a Bachelor of Science degree in astronomy and physics from Haverford College and a masters from Stanford University's engineering school.

Aggarwal is the daughter of Raj Aggarwal, the former dean of the University of Akron College of Business Administration.

== Career ==
Aggarwal worked briefly in the accident prevention design engineering group at Perry Nuclear Power Plant, conducted research on how renewable energy could serve remote areas in India without comprehensive access to electricity, advised cleantech startup companies on communications, managed research for ClimateWorks Foundation, and co-founded the non-partisan think tank Energy Innovation, where she returned as CEO after serving in the White House.
