= 1366 Technologies =

1366 Technologies was a company based in Bedford, Massachusetts that developed a technique to produce silicon wafers by casting them in their ultimate shape directly in a mold, rather than the prevailing standard method in which wafers are cut from a large ingot. In July 2021, the company merged with Dallas-based Hunt Perovskite Technologies to form a new company, CubicPV. The company's management predicted that the new approach will be able to produce wafers at half the cost of current methods. The company's name was a reference to the solar constant, representing the watts of solar energy that hits each square meter outside of Earth's atmosphere.

== Technology ==
The company used a $4 million grant obtained from the United States Department of Energy's Advanced Research Projects Agency-Energy (ARPA-E) program in December 2009 to fund research over an 18-month period. Grants from ARPA-E are designed to provide money to relatively small projects offering the potential for high-payoff results in fostering advanced techniques. 1366 Technologies was able to announce eight months into the grant period that it had achieved success in its casting technology, in which molten silicon is poured directly into a mold to produce wafers in their final form, a square 6 inches (15 cm) on each side that is 200 micrometres thick and are then extracted from the mold using a proprietary technique to ensure that the wafer doesn't break while being removed. In traditional methods, wafers of this size are cut from a large single ingot or crystal, in an approach that leaves as much as half of the original silicon ingot as waste.

David Danielson, program director for solar energy at ARPA-E said that "early indications show this could be one of our great success stories." ARPA-E's first director Arun Majumdar estimated that current techniques generate solar power at a cost of $4 per watt, and that bringing down that cost to $1.50 per watt could lead to the widespread adoption of solar energy. Company president Frank van Mierlo estimated that solar power generated using wafers from 1366 Technologies would be cheaper than power generated using coal.

The company is now on their third generation of wafer-producing machines, which are full-sized, industrial line machines. The company will open a commercial-scale factory in upstate New York, slated for completion in 2017. This plant will start producing 50 million wafers annually, totaling 250 megawatts of output. It will eventually scale to 600 million wafers and 3,000 MW of annual production.

== Financing ==
1366 Technologies has raised $70 million in capital to commercialize their innovation, from such investors as South Korean Hanwha Chemical, a major user of silicon wafers, as well as from Ventizz Capital Fund, North Bridge Venture Partners and Polaris Venture Partners.
