= Climateworks =

Climateworks or ClimateWorks may refer to:

- Climateworks Centre, an independent non-profit in Melbourne, Australia (formerly ClimateWorks Australia)
- ClimateWorks Foundation, an independent non-profit in San Francisco, United States
