= The Conversion =

The Conversion may refer to:

- "The Conversion" (Seinfeld), a 1993 TV episode
- "The Conversion" (The Outer Limits), a 1995 TV episode
- The Conversion, a 2008 novel by Joseph Olshan

== See also ==
- Conversion (disambiguation)
