= Ellen D. Williams (scientist) =

American chemist (born 1953)

Ellen D. Williams ForMemRS
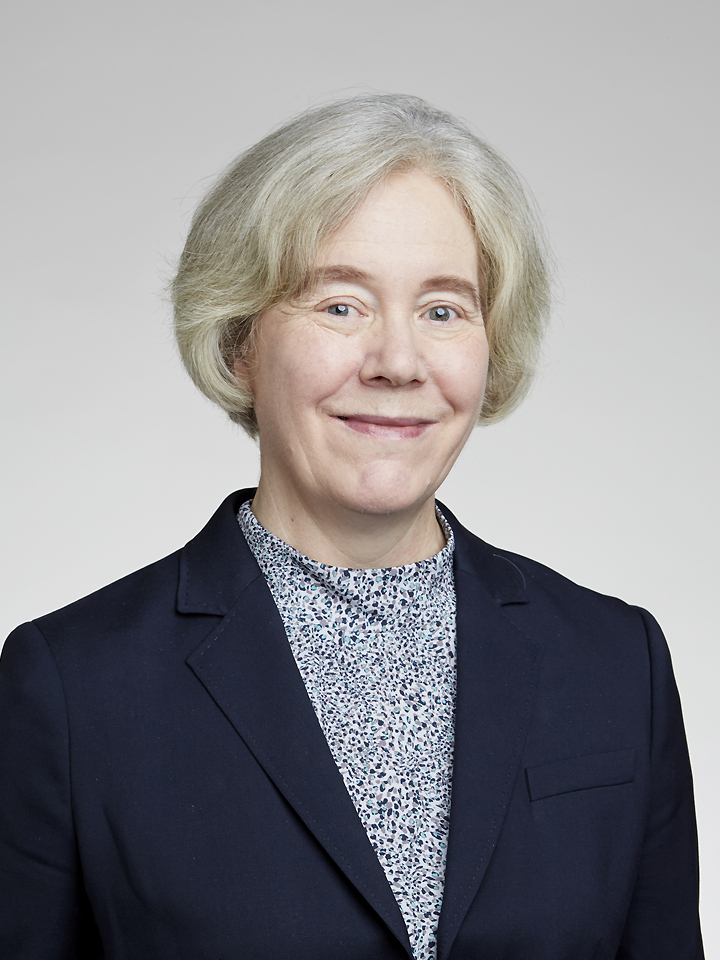
- Williams in 2016
- Born: December 5, 1953 (age 72); Oshkosh, Wisconsin, U.S.
- Education: Michigan State University (BS); California Institute of Technology (PhD)
- Awards: Member of the National Academy of Sciences (2005); Foreign Member of the Royal Society (2016)
- Scientific career
- Workplaces: University of Maryland; BP
- Thesis: Studies of chemical adsorption using low energy electron diffraction (1982)
- Doctoral advisor: William Henry Weinberg
- Website: www.alumni.caltech.edu/distinguished-alumni/2016/5/27/ellen-d-williams-phd-82-chemistry

Ellen D. Williams ForMemRS (born December 5, 1953) is an American scientist, best known for her research in surface properties and nanotechnology, for her engagement with technical issues in national security, as chief scientist of BP, and for government service as director of ARPA-E.

== Early life and education ==
Born in Oshkosh, Wisconsin, Williams grew up in the suburbs of Detroit, Michigan. She attended Michigan State University and received her Bachelor of Science degree in chemistry in 1976. Her graduate studies were at the California Institute of Technology, where she received her PhD in chemistry in 1981, for research supervised by William Henry Weinberg.

== Career ==
Williams did postdoctoral studies at the University of Maryland under the supervision of R.L. Park from 1981 to 1983. Then promoted to assistant professor in the department of physics and astronomy, which is part of the University of Maryland College of Computer, Mathematical, and Natural Sciences, she advanced to associate professor in 1987, and professor of physics and the Institute for Physical Science and Technology in 1991. Building on her fundamental work on the morphology of solid surfaces, she founded the University of Maryland Materials Research Group in 1991 and led its expansion to become the Materials Research Science and Engineering Center in 1996. She served as its director from 1996 through 2009. In 2000 she was named distinguished university professor. She was elected to the American Academy of Arts and Sciences in 2003, and to the National Academy of Sciences in 2005. She served as the chair of the NAS committee on Technical Issues Concerning the Comprehensive Test Ban Treaty from 2009 to 2011.

In 2010, Williams took a leave of absence from UMD to become chief scientist at BP, a position which she held until April 2014. Then, having been nominated by President Barack Obama in November 2013 to become director of ARPA-E and awaiting Senate confirmation, she became a senior adviser in the office of the Secretary of Energy. She was confirmed on December 8, 2014, and subsequently sworn into her position at ARPA-E. She served as ARPA-E director until the end of the Obama administration in January 2017, and then resumed her position as distinguished university professor at the University of Maryland. In May 2020, Williams was appointed as director of the Earth System Science Interdisciplinary Center at the University of Maryland. Her five-year term as director began in July 2020. She sits on the International Scientific Advisory Committee of Australia's ARC Centre of Excellence in Future Low-Energy Electronics Technologies.

=== Academic Research ===
Williams' research in experimental surface science explores fundamental issues in statistical mechanics, particularly including practical applications nanotechnology. Her research group pioneered applications of direct imaging techniques for atomic-scale structures on surfaces. She worked closely with theorists to design experiments to address theoretical and conceptual questions important to the fields of catalysis, thin film growth and nano-electronics. She has published over 200 academic articles, which have been cited over 8000 times. Her most widely cited work includes at least four areas of fundamental research (see Selected Publications below); structure-transport relationships in graphene, surface morphology and step fluctuations, electronic interactions with surface defects, and adsorbate-interactions.

=== Technical Issues in National Security ===
In parallel with her academic career, Williams has worked extensively in providing technical advice to the U.S. government, primarily through the Departments of Energy and Defense. As a result of her experience, in 2009 she was asked to lead a study on issues of verification of nuclear testing, which was one of the concerns cited in the Senate decision not to ratify the treaty in 1999. The resulting report, reviews the verification capabilities in the US and at the Comprehensive Nuclear Test-Ban Organization (CTBTO), and shows that detection capability advanced significantly over the years after the 1999 U.S. decision not to ratify. The report places the state-of-the art detection capability in the context of different types of proliferation threats, and thus provides a valuable context for decision makers. The report also emphasizes the importance of sustaining and continuing to advance technical capabilities for verification, both in the U.S. and at the CTBTO. Williams is the vice-chair of JASON, an independent group of scientists offering advice to the US government on key science and technology issues.

=== Chief Scientist at BP ===
At BP, Williams worked in Group Technology, where she was responsible for assurance of technology programs, and strategic research and program development. Early in her tenure, she set up the initial advisory structure for BP's Gulf of Mexico Research Initiative Within the company, she advocated for increased implementation of advanced computational approaches in molecular chemistry, fluid dynamics, and distributed sensing and 'big data' analysis. She also led a strategic multi-university research program on natural resource constraints in the context of energy (the Energy Sustainability Challenge),. In addition to the extensive University research publications that resulted from the program, the ESC team also created three reference booklets on energy-resource issues, "The ESC Materials Handbook", "Water in the Energy Industry," and "Biomass in the Energy Industry". Williams has spoken widely about the need for advances in Science and Technology to sustainably supply the energy the world needs.

=== Department of Energy ===
Prior to Senate confirmation for her role in ARPA-E, Williams served as a senior advisor to the Secretary on DOE's technology transfer policies, issues, and plans. She established the Department's new Office of Technology Transitions to expand the economic impact of the Department's extensive Research and Development activities.

Williams joined ARPA-E just before its sixth anniversary, as the Agency's portfolio of active and alumni technology development programs were forming a pipeline of energy technology innovation that ranges from early stage to more mature stages of technical readiness. As a result of ARPA-E's unique operational model, in which projects are managed both against ambitious technical and commercial goals, increasing numbers of the mature projects were proving attractive to follow-on investors, had products in field testing, or had early stage commercial products. During her tenure at ARPA-E, Williams focused on streamlining ARPA-E's administrative processes to better support the innovation teams working under ARPA-E funding, on strengthening the support given teams in preparing their new technologies for commercial uptake, and on establishing rigorous assessment practices. Under her direction, the Agency produced the first two of a planned annual series of Impact Assessments, which present the challenges, technical achievements, and pathways to commercial impact for selected ARPA-E projects.

== Awards and honors ==
In 2016 Williams was elected a Foreign Member of the Royal Society (ForMemRS) of London. Other honors include:

- Fellow of the American Association for the Advancement of Science, 2019
- Honorary Member of Sigma Pi Sigma the physics honors society 2019.
- Distinguished Alumnus Award, California Institute of Technology 2016
- Honorary Ph.D., Michigan State University, 2016
- Member of the National Academy of Sciences, 2005
- Materials Research Society – David Turnbull Award, 2003
- Fellow of the American Academy of Arts and Sciences, 2003
- American Physical Society – David Adler Lectureship Award in the Field of Materials Physics, 2001
- Japan Society for the Promotion of Science Fellow (1996)
- Fellow of the American Vacuum Society, 1993
- Fellow of the American Physical Society, 1992
- American Physical Society Maria Goeppert Mayer Award, 1990
- Office of Naval Research Young Investigator, 1986-1989
- Presidential Young Investigator Award of the National Science Foundation, 1984-1989

== Selected publications ==
Williams has authored or co-authored numerous peer reviewed scientific journal articles including:

=== Structure-transport relationships in graphene ===
Applying the experimental approaches developed through her career, Williams worked with collaborator Michael Fuhrer to develop key early understanding about structural fluctuations and defect interactions in defining graphene's properties.

- Ishigami, Masa; Chen, J. H.; Cullen, W. G.; Fuhrer, M. S.; Williams, E. D. (2007-06-01). "Atomic Structure of Graphene on SiO_{2}". Nano Letters. 7 (6): 1643–1648. arXiv:0811.0587. Bibcode:2007NanoL...7.1643I. doi:10.1021/nl070613a. ISSN 1530-6984. PMID 17497819.
- 2008 J.H. Chen, C. Jang, M.S. Fuhrer, E.D. Williams and M. Ishigami, Charged impurity scattering in graphene, Nature Physics 4, 377- 381
- 2009 J. H. Chen, W. G. Cullen, C. Jang, M. S. Fuhrer and E. D. Williams, Defect Scattering in Graphene, Physical Review Letters 102, 236805
- 2011 J.-H. Chen, L. Li, W.G. Cullen, E.D. Williams and M.S. Fuhrer, Tunable Kondo effect in graphene with defects, Nature Physics, 7, 535

=== Surface morphology and step fluctuations ===
Williams' research group discovered the remarkable ability of silicon surfaces to undergo reversible micron-scale changes in structure, and demonstrated how such changes are thermodynamically defined by changes in the free-energy of steps on the surface. The group's subsequent experimental work elegantly placed observations of structures and fluctuations of steps in a universally applicable theoretical formalism.

- Phaneuf, R. J.; Williams, Ellen D. (1987-06-15). "Surface phase separation of vicinal Si(111)". Physical Review Letters. 58 (24): 2563–2566. Bibcode:1987PhRvL..58.2563P. doi:10.1103/PhysRevLett.58.2563. ISSN 0031-9007. PMID 10034784.
- Wang, X.-S.; Goldberg, J. L.; Bartelt, N. C.; Einstein, T. L.; Williams, Ellen D. (1990-11-05). "Terrace-width distributions on vicinal Si(111)". Physical Review Letters. 65 (19): 2430–2433. Bibcode:1990PhRvL..65.2430W. doi:10.1103/PhysRevLett.65.2430. hdl:1903/32280. ISSN 0031-9007. PMID 10042546.
- Williams, Ellen D.; Bartelt, N. C. (1991-01-25). "Thermodynamics of Surface Morphology". Science. 251 (4992): 393–400. Bibcode:1991Sci...251..393W. doi:10.1126/science.251.4992.393. ISSN 0036-8075. PMID 17775103.
- 1993 N.C. Bartelt, T.L. Einstein, E.D. Williams, J. J. Métois, J.C. Heyraud, J.L Goldberg, The Brownian Motion of Steps on Vicinal Si(111), Phys. Rev. B48, 15453.
- 1991 R.J. Phaneuf, N.C. Bartelt, E.D. Williams, W. Swiech and E. Bauer., LEEM Investigation of Orientational Phase Separation on Vicinal Si(111), Phys. Rev. Lett. 21, 2986.
- 1999 H.-C. Jeong and E.D. Williams, "Steps on Surfaces: Experiment and Theory," Surface Sci. Report, 34; 171-294. (Review Article)
- Thürmer, K.; Reutt-Robey, J. E.; Williams, Ellen D.; Uwaha, M.; Emundts, A.; Bonzel, H. P. (2001-10-10). "Step Dynamics in 3D Crystal Shape Relaxation". Physical Review Letters. 87 (18) 186102. Bibcode:2001PhRvL..87r6102T. doi:10.1103/PhysRevLett.87.186102. ISSN 0031-9007.
- Conrad, B. R.; Cullen, W. G.; Dougherty, D. B.; Lyubinetsky, I.; Williams, E. D. (2007-02-09). "Spatial first-passage statistics of Al/Si(111)-(sqrt(3)×sqrt(3)) step fluctuations". Physical Review E. 75 (2) 021603. arXiv:0810.0437. doi:10.1103/PhysRevE.75.021603. ISSN 1539-3755. PMID 17358349.

=== Electronic interactions with surface defects ===
Williams' group also explored the interaction of surface structure with electric fields and currents. They demonstrated how the incredibly small momentum-transfer due to an electron colliding with an atom can none-the-less cause micron-scale rearrangements of the material near the surfaces.

- 1996 Y. N. Yang, E. Fu and E.D. Williams, An STM Study of Current Induced Step Bunching on Si(111), Surface Sci. 356, 101 111.
- 1995 E.D. Williams, E. Fu, Y. N. Yang, D. Kandel and J.D. Weeks, Measurement of the Anisotropy Ratio During Current Induced Step Bunching, Surface Sci. 336, L746.
- 2000 C.S. Ganpule, V. Nagarajan, S.B. Ogale, A.L. Roytburd, E.D. Williams, and R. Ramesh, Domain nucleation and relaxation kinetics in ferroelectric thin films, Applied Physics Letters 77 3275-3277.
- Conrad, B.R.; Cullen, W.G.; Riddick, B.C.; Williams, E.D. (2009). "Pentacene islands grown on ultra-thin SiO_{2}". Surface Science. 603 (3): L27–L30. arXiv:0811.2515. Bibcode:2009SurSc.603L..27C. doi:10.1016/j.susc.2008.12.020.
- Tao, C.; Cullen, W. G.; Williams, E. D. (2010-05-07). "Visualizing the Electron Scattering Force in Nanostructures". Science. 328 (5979): 736–740. Bibcode:2010Sci...328..736T. doi:10.1126/science.1186648. ISSN 0036-8075. PMID 20448180.

=== Adsorbate-interactions ===
Williams' graduate work explored how catalytically important molecules such as carbon monoxide and hydrogen interact with metal surfaces. She made seminal observations of how such molecules organize on surfaces and how the molecules (which are called 'adsorbates' once they are on the surface) interact with each other. The nature of such adsorbates and their relationship to the formation of structures on surfaces informed all of Williams' subsequent work.

- 1978 E.D. Williams, S. L. Cunningham and W.H. Weinberg, A Determination of Adatom Adatom Interaction Energies: Application to Oxygen Chemisorbed on the Tungsten (110) Surface, J. Chem. Phys. 68, 4688.
- 1979 E.D. Williams and W.H. Weinberg, The Geometric Structure of Carbon Monoxide Chemisorbed on the Ruthenium (001) Surface at Low Temperatures,"Surface Sci. 82, 93
- 1980 E.D. Williams, P.A. Thiel, W.H. Weinberg, and J.T. Yates, Jr., Segregation of Co absorbed Species: Hydrogen and Carbon Monoxide on the Rh(111) Surface, J. Chem. Phys. 72, 3496
- 1994 Y. N. Yang and E.D. Williams, High Atom Density in the "1x1" Phase Origin of the Metastable Reconstructions on Si(111), Phys Rev. Lett. 72, 1862
- 2005 Bo Xu, Chenggang Tao, William G. Cullen, Janice E. Reutt-Robey, and Ellen D. Williams, Chiral Symmetry Breaking in Two-Dimensional C60-ACA Intermixed Systems, Nano Letters 5, 2207-11.
