= Rakesh Agrawal =

Rakesh Agrawal may refer to:

- Rakesh Agrawal (chemical engineer), National Medal of Technology & Innovation Laureate; professor at Purdue University
- Rakesh Agrawal (computer scientist), former Technical Fellow at the Microsoft Search Labs

== See also ==
- Rakesh Aggarwal (born 1975), British businessman
- Rakesh Aggarwal (gastroenterologist) (born 1961), Indian gastroenterologist
