= Converter =

Converter may refer to:

== Electromagnetics ==
- Frequency converter
- Voltage converter, another name for
  - Electromagnetic transformer
  - Switched-mode power supply
  - DC-to-DC converter
  - Power inverter (DC to AC)
    - Solar inverter

== Electronics ==
- Digital-to-analog converter
- Analog-to-digital converter
- "Frequency-to-Voltage converter" (F-V converter), a frequency detector for voltage-controlled guitar synthesizer
- A combination local oscillator and mixer stage in a superheterodyne receiver
- "Converter", an alternate name for a remote control

=== In television ===
- Cable converter box, an electronic device use in cable television systems
- Digital television adapter, sometimes known as a "converter box"

== Information technology ==
- Low-noise converter, in communications
- Scan conversion between video formats
- File format converter, for converting between various file formats
- Currency converter, a piece of software for converting one currency into another

== Metallurgy ==
- Converter (metallurgy), a device for metallurgical smelting
  - Bessemer converter
  - Manhès-David converter
  - see also basic oxygen steelmaking

== Vehicles, automobiles ==
- Catalytic converter, in automobiles
- Autogas converter, part of an automotive LPG system, also known as a vaporiser or pressure reducer

== Other uses ==
- Torque converter, a fluid coupling to transfer torque
- Fountain pen converter, a removable filling mechanism for fountain pens
- Unit converter, for converting between different units of measurement
- Converters (industry), companies that create end products from rolls of raw material

== See also ==
- Convertors, a brand of toy robots designed for changing into other shapes such as vehicles or animals
- Conversion (disambiguation)
- Adapter (disambiguation)
