= Interpretation =

Interpretation may refer to:

== Culture ==
- Aesthetic interpretation, an explanation of the meaning of a work of art
- Allegorical interpretation, an approach that assumes a text should not be interpreted literally
- Dramatic Interpretation, an event in speech and forensics competitions in which participants perform excerpts from plays
- Heritage interpretation, communication about the nature and purpose of historical, natural, or cultural phenomena
- Interpretation (music), the process of a performer deciding how to perform music that has been previously composed
- Language interpretation, the facilitation of dialogue between parties using different languages
- Literary theory, broad methods for interpreting literature, including historicism, feminism, structuralism, deconstruction
  - Literary criticism, interpretation of particular works of literature
- Oral interpretation, a dramatic art

== Law ==
- Authentic interpretation, the official interpretation of a statute issued by the statute's legislator
- Financial Accounting Standards Board Interpretations, part of the United States Generally Accepted Accounting Principles (US GAAP)
- Interpretation Act, a stock short title used for legislation relating to interpretation of legislation
- Judicial interpretation, an interpretation of law by a judiciary
- Statutory interpretation, determining the meaning of legislation

== Math and computing ==
- Interpretation (model theory), a technical notion that approximates the idea of representing a logical structure inside another structure
- Interpreter (computing), a part of an interpreted programming language that executes programs directly
- Interpretation function, in mathematical logic a function that assigns functions and relations to the symbols of a signature
- Interpretations of quantum mechanics, a set of statements which attempt to explain how quantum mechanics informs our understanding of nature
- Interpretability, a concept in mathematical logic

== Media ==
- Interpretation centre, an institution for dissemination of knowledge of natural or cultural heritage
- Interpretations: A 25th Anniversary Celebration, an album by The Carpenters

== Neuroscience ==
- Interpretation of dreams (disambiguation)

== Philosophy ==
- Interpretation (philosophy), the assignment of meanings to various concepts, symbols, or objects under consideration
- Interpretation (logic), an assignment of meaning to the symbols of a formal language
- De Interpretatione, a work by Aristotle
- Exegesis, a critical explanation or interpretation of a text
- Hermeneutics, the study of interpretation theory
- Semantics, the study of meaning in words, phrases, signs, and symbols
- Interpretant, a concept in semiotics

== Religion ==
- Biblical interpretation, the study of the principles of interpretation concerning the books of the Bible
- Interpretation (Catholic canon law), in the Catholic Church, rules for the exact interpretation and acceptation of words
- Interpretation (journal), an academic journal that covers the field of Presbyterian biblical studies
- Interpretation of Knowledge, a codex in the Nag Hammadi library of early Christian Gnostic texts
- Interpretation of tongues, a supernatural ability to understand unknown languages

== See also ==
- Interpreter (disambiguation)
- Derivative (disambiguation)
- Imitation
- Mimicry
- Translation (disambiguation)
