= Cheryl Martin =

American chemist (born 1962)

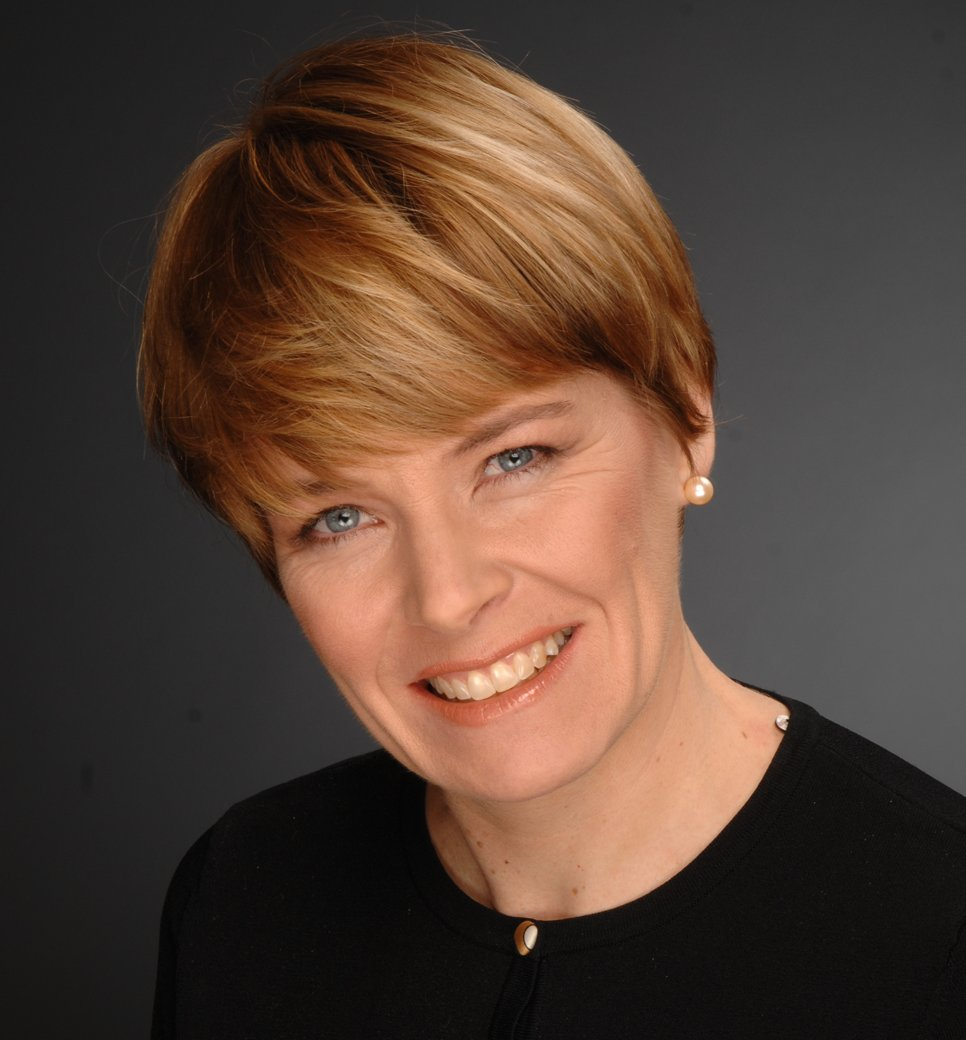
- Martin in 2007

Acting Director of the Advanced Research Projects Agency–Energy
- In office 2013–2014
- President: Barack Obama
- Preceded by: Eric Toone (acting)
- Succeeded by: Ellen Williams

Deputy Director for Commercialization of the Advanced Research Projects Agency–Energy
- In office August 2011 – March 2015
- President: Barack Obama

Personal details
- Born: 1962 (age 63–64)
- Education: College of the Holy Cross (BA); Massachusetts Institute of Technology (PhD)
- Scientific career
- Fields: Organic chemistry
- Thesis: Design and application of chiral ligands for the improvement of metal-catalyzed asymmetric transformations (1989)
- Doctoral advisor: Barry Sharpless

Cheryl Ann Martin (born 1962) is an American organic chemist who served as deputy director for commercialization and later acting director of the Advanced Research Projects Agency–Energy (ARPA-E) from 2013 to 2014.

After graduating from the College of the Holy Cross in 1984, Martin earned her doctorate in 1989 from the Massachusetts Institute of Technology, where she studied under Nobel laureate K. Barry Sharpless. She spent more than two decades at Rohm and Haas, where she became corporate vice president and general manager of its European Paint and Coatings Materials business.

After leaving Rohm and Haas, Martin worked in venture capital at Kleiner Perkins, served as interim chief executive officer of Renmatix, and joined ARPA-E in 2011. She later founded the consulting firm Harwich Partners, became a nonresident fellow at Columbia University's Center on Global Energy Policy, and was a managing board member of the World Economic Forum.

== Early life and education ==
Martin was born in 1962 and was raised in Massachusetts. Her father was an environmental engineer. She graduated from the College of the Holy Cross with a Bachelor of Arts (B.A.) in chemistry in 1984. She then earned her Ph.D. in organic chemistry from the Massachusetts Institute of Technology (MIT) in 1989. Her doctoral adviser was chemist K. Barry Sharpless, and her research focused on the use of chiral ligands to improve metal-catalyzed asymmetric reactions. As a doctoral student at MIT, she spent a summer conducting research in the laboratory of Henri Kagan at Paris-Sud University in France. Her doctoral dissertation was titled, Design and application of chiral ligands for the improvement of metal-catalyzed asymmetric transformations.

== Career ==
=== Rohm and Haas (1988–2009) ===
After receiving her doctorate, Martin was a senior scientist in exploratory plastics and plastics additives at Rohm and Haas until 1993. She became a quality-systems manager in 1993 and a research manager in the company's Plastics Additives business in 1994, remaining in the latter position until 1998. Martin then moved into commercial management, serving as North American market manager for packaging and durable products in the Plastics Additives business from 1998 to 1999 and as worldwide market manager for specialty coatings from 1999 to 2000. From 2000 to 2003 she was Rohm and Haas's director of investor relations, after which was its director of financial planning from 2003 to 2005. She became general manager of the company's North American Adhesives and Sealants business in 2005 and served as co-director of its global Adhesives and Sealants business in 2006. In 2007, Martin was elected a corporate vice president of Rohm and Haas and then was general manager of the company's Paint and Coatings Materials business for Europe until 2009.

=== Venture capital and ARPA-E (2010–2014) ===
In January 2010, Martin joined the venture-capital firm Kleiner Perkins Caufield & Byers as an executive in residence, remaining there until August 2011. While at Kleiner Perkins, she served from March to August 2010 as interim chief executive officer of Renmatix, a startup developing renewable-material technologies.

Martin joined the Advanced Research Projects Agency–Energy (ARPA-E) in August 2011 as deputy director for commercialization, a position she held until March 2015. She led ARPA-E's Technology-to-Market program, which was designed to help technologies developed with agency support progress toward commercial deployment. She also served as acting director of ARPA-E during 2013 and 2014. As acting director, Martin announced a 2014 funding commitment of up to $60 million for technologies aimed at measuring methane emissions and reducing energy use for heating and cooling buildings.

=== Consulting and later career ===
After leaving ARPA-E, Martin founded the consulting firm Harwich Partners in 2015 to advise public- and private-sector organizations on the business, technological, financial, regulatory, and policy factors affecting the adoption of new technologies. In April 2015, she also became a nonresident fellow at the Center on Global Energy Policy at Columbia University.

Martin joined the World Economic Forum (WEF) in March 2016 as head of its Centre for Global Industries and as a member of its managing board. Her initial responsibilities at the Forum included expanding industry partnerships and private-sector participation in public–private initiatives addressing global challenges. By 2018, she was managing director and head of the Forum's Global Centre for Innovation and Entrepreneurship. Martin remained a member of the World Economic Forum's managing board until November 2018.

Following her departure from the WEF, Martin returned to leading Harwich Partners. In May 2020, she became chair of the board of agricultural-technology company Sound Agriculture. In November 2022, she was appointed an independent non-executive board member of aviation-services company Menzies Aviation, with a particular focus on innovation and sustainability. Martin has also served as a venture partner at Colle Capital.
