= Conversion =

Conversion or convert may refer to:

== Arts, entertainment, and media ==
- The Convert, a 2023 film produced by Jump Film & Television and Brouhaha Entertainment
- "Conversion" (Doctor Who audio), an episode of the audio drama Cyberman
- "Conversion" (Stargate Atlantis), an episode of the television series Stargate Atlantis
- "The Conversion" (The Outer Limits), a 1995 episode of the television series The Outer Limits
- "Chapter 19: The Convert", an episode of the television series The Mandalorian

== Business and marketing ==
- Conversion funnel, the path a consumer takes through the web toward or near a desired action or conversion
- Conversion marketing, when a website's visitors take a desired action
- Converting timber to commercial lumber

== Computing, science, and technology ==
- Conversion of units, conversion between different units of measurement

=== Computing and telecommunication ===
- CHS conversion of data storage, mapping cylinder/head/sector tuples to linear base address
- CPS conversion, in computer science, changing the form of continuation-passing
- Code conversion, in telecommunication, converting from one code to another
- convert (command), a command-line utility in the Windows NT operating system
- Convert, a command-line (graphics) image manipulation utility that is part of ImageMagick
- Data conversion, conversion of computer data from one format to another
  - Transcoding, analog-to-analog or digital-to-digital conversion of one video encoding to another
- Type conversion, in computer science, changing the data type of a value into another data type

=== Other sciences ===
- Conversion (chemistry), the ratio of selectivity to yield or the change of a molecule
- Electric vehicle conversion, modification of a conventional vehicle to battery electric
- Energy conversion, the process of changing one form of energy to another
- Internal conversion, a radioactive decay process

== Economics, finance, and property law ==
- Conversion (exchange), the rate at which one currency will be exchanged for another
- Conversion (law), a voluntary act by one person inconsistent with the ownership rights of another
- Conversion (options), an options-trading strategy in options arbitrage
- Economic conversion, a technical, economic and political process for moving from military to civilian markets
- Equitable conversion, a change in the nature of property so that real property is treated as personal property

== Psychiatry ==
- Conversion disorder, a condition in which neurological symptoms arise without a definable organic cause
- Conversion therapy, a pseudo-scientific treatment to turn a homo- or bisexual person into a heterosexual person

== Religion ==
- Religious conversion, the adoption of a new religious identity
  - Deathbed conversion, a form of religious conversion
  - Forced conversion, forced adoption of a new religious identity
  - Marital conversion, a form of religious conversion
  - Secondary conversion, a form of religious conversion
  - Psychology of religious conversion, psychological aspect of religious conversion
- Conversion to Buddhism, religious conversion to Buddhism
- Conversion to Christianity, religious conversion to Christianity
  - Conversion of Paul the Apostle, personal conversion of Paul of Tarsus
  - Conversion of Constantine, personal conversion of emperor Constantine
  - Conversion to Catholicism, religious conversion to the Catholicism
  - Conversion of non-Christian places of worship into churches, conversion into churches
- Conversion to Hinduism, religious conversion to Hinduism
- Conversion to Islam, religious conversion to Islam
  - Safavid conversion of Iran to Shia Islam, conversion within Islam in Iran
  - Conversion of non-Islamic places of worship into mosques, conversion into mosques
- Conversion to Judaism, religious conversion to Judaism
- Conversion of the Jews, religious conversion of the Jewish people
- History of Jewish conversion to Christianity, conversion of the Jews to Christianity

== Sports ==
- Conversion (gridiron football), in American or Canadian football an opportunity to score an additional point following a touchdown
  - Two-point conversion, a gridiron football conversion to score two points
- Track and field athletics, an estimate of what a performance which has been measured in one system of measurements would have been if it had been measured in the other system
- Try#Conversion, in rugby, a kick at goal to convert a try into a larger set of points

== Other uses ==
- Conversion (barn), conversion of old farming barns to commercial or residential use
- Conversion (logic), reversing the two parts of a categorical or implicational statement
- Conversion (word formation), the creation of a word from an existing word without any change in form
- Conversion of CBD to THC
- Miniature conversion, altering the appearance of a miniature or model from the standard version

== See also ==
- Converter (disambiguation)
- Translation (disambiguation)
