= Arun Majumdar =

American materials scientist, engineer and professor

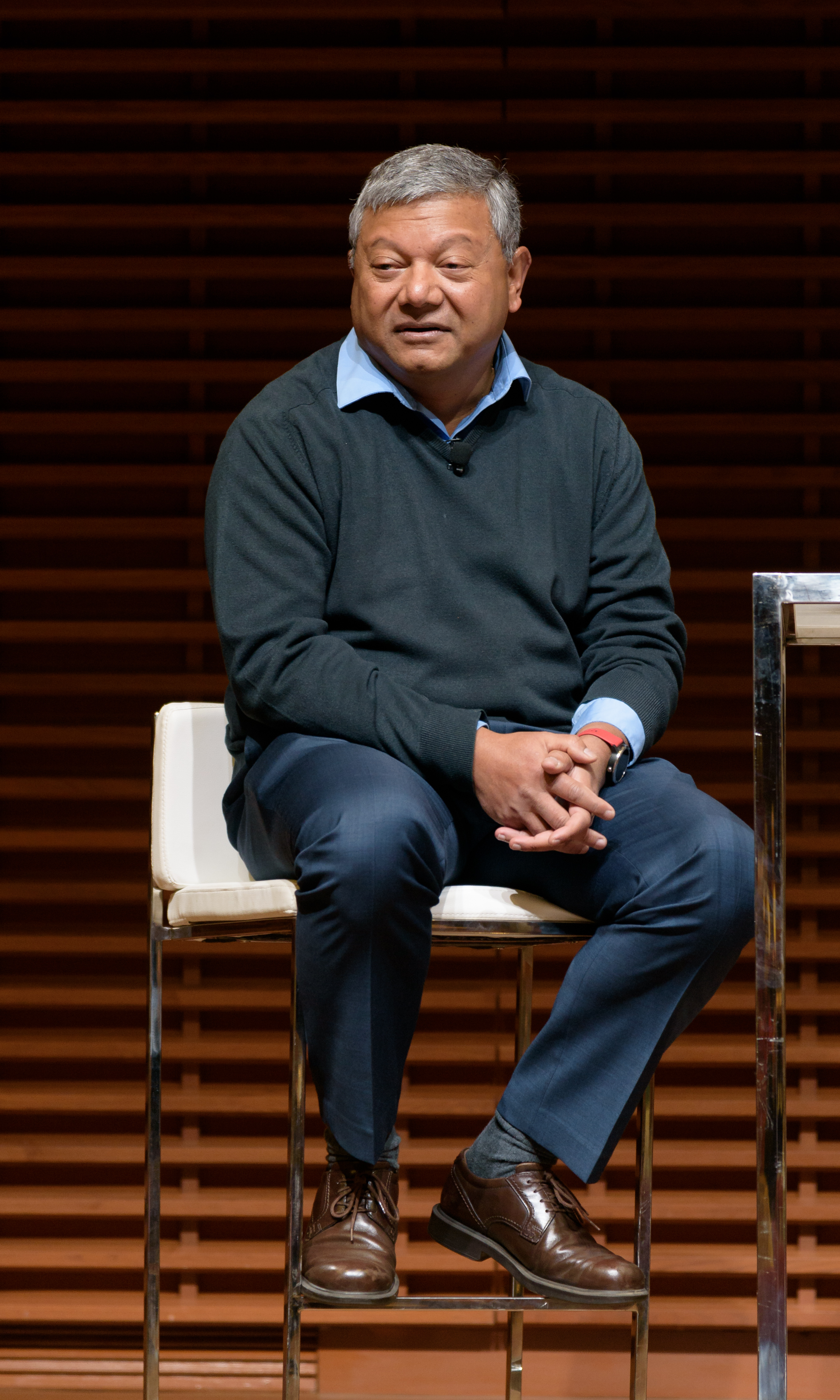

Dean, Stanford Doerr School of Sustainability
- Incumbent
- Assumed office May 2022
- Preceded by: N/A

Director of Advanced Research Projects Agency-Energy
- President: Barack Obama
- Preceded by: Position established
- Succeeded by: Cheryl Martin (acting)

Personal details
- Education: Indian Institute of Technology, Bombay (BS); University of California, Berkeley (MS, PhD)

Arunava Majumdar is a materials scientist, engineer, and the inaugural dean of the Stanford Doerr School of Sustainability. He was nominated for the position of Under Secretary of Energy in the United States between November 30, 2011, and May 15, 2012.

Majumdar was previously the director of the Environmental Energy Technologies Division at the Lawrence Berkeley National Laboratory (LBNL), where he was also deputy director of LBNL as well as professor of mechanical engineering at the University of California, Berkeley.

Majumdar was nominated to be the first director of the U.S. Department of Energy's Advanced Research Projects Agency-Energy (ARPA-E) and appointed to that position in September 2009.

== Education ==
Majumdar completed his PhD at University of California, Berkeley, after a bachelor's at Indian Institute of Technology Bombay. His scientific work is in the fields of thermoelectric materials, heat and mass transfer, thermal management, and waste heat recovery. He has published several hundred papers, patents, and conference proceedings. In 2005, Majumdar was elected a member of the National Academy of Engineering for contributions to nanoscale thermal engineering and molecular nanomechanics. He served as one of the science envoys of the US in 2014.

== Career ==
In 2012, Majumdar joined Google to drive Google.org's energy initiatives and advise the company on their broader energy strategy. Thereafter, he was the Jay Precourt Professor at Stanford University, where he served on the faculty of the department of mechanical engineering and was a senior fellow of the Precourt Institute for Energy. He also served on the engineering and computer science jury for the Infosys Prize from 2012 to 2016.

In November 2020, Majumdar was named a volunteer member of the Joe Biden presidential transition agency review team to support transition efforts related to the United States Department of Energy, Federal Energy Regulatory Commission, and the Nuclear Regulatory Commission.

Majumdar was under consideration to be the Secretary of Energy in the Biden administration. Majumdar was the co-director of the Precourt Institute for Energy before becoming the inaugural dean of the Stanford Doerr School of Sustainability.

== Views ==
Majumdar discussed the "four-zero climate solution" on Greg Dalton's Climate One podcast also featuring Hal Harvey and Kate Gordon. This involves "a zero-emissions electric grid, zero-emission transportation, zero-emission buildings, and zero waste manufacturing."
