= Energy Innovation =

American think tank

- Founded: 2012
- Type: Nonprofit
- Legal status: 501(c)(3)
- Location: San Francisco, California
- Fields: Energy, climate policy
- Key people: Hal Harvey, Founder; Sonia Aggarwal, CEO
- Website: energyinnovation.org

Energy Innovation is an American non-partisan policy think tank focused on energy and climate policy. It is the creator of the Energy Policy Simulator tool, which, according to The Times, "lets you see the potential impact of a wider array of climate policies and technological advances."
