= Derivation =

Derivation may refer to:

== Language ==
- Morphological derivation, a word-formation process
- Parse tree or concrete syntax tree, representing a string's syntax in formal grammars

== Law ==
- Derivative work, in copyright law
- Derivation proceeding, a proceeding in United States patent law

== Music ==
- The creation of a derived row, in the twelve-tone musical technique

== Science and mathematics ==
- Derivation (differential algebra), a unary function satisfying the Leibniz product law
- Formal proof or derivation, a sequence of sentences each of which is an axiom or follows from the preceding sentences in the sequence by a rule of inference
- An after-the-fact justification for an action, in the work of sociologist Vilfredo Pareto

== See also ==
- Derive (disambiguation), for meanings of "derive" and "derived"
- Derivative, in calculus
- Derivative (disambiguation)
