= Derive =

Derive may refer to:

- Derive (computer algebra system), a commercial system made by Texas Instruments
- Dérive (magazine), an Austrian science magazine on urbanism
- Dérive, a psychogeographical concept
- Derived trait, or apomorphy

== See also ==
- Derivation (disambiguation)
- Derivative (disambiguation)
