= Interpreter (disambiguation) =

An interpreter is someone who performs interpretation, not just translation, of speech or sign from a language into another.

Interpreter may also refer to:

== Math and computing ==
- Interpreter (computing), a computer program that directly executes a programming or scripting language
- Interpreter pattern, a software engineering design pattern which embeds an interpreter inside a system
- Punched card interpreter, a machine that interprets the holes in a punched card

== Media ==
=== Film and television ===
- The Interpreter (2005 film), a 2005 film
- The Interpreter (2018 film), a 2018 Slovak film
- The Interpreter, working title of 2023 film Guy Ritchie's The Covenant
- The Interpreter (TV series), a 2016 Chinese television series

=== Literary ===
- The Interpreter (Aldiss novel), a 1960 novel by Brian W. Aldiss
- The Interpreter (Kim novel), a 2003 novel by Suki Kim
- The Interpreter: A Story of Two Worlds New York, a 2012 book by Robert Moss
- The Interpreters (novel), a 1965 novel by Wole Soyinka
- Interpreter (journal), a Mormon studies journal
- The Interpreter, a blog published by the Lowy Institute

=== Music ===
- The Interpreters (band), a Philadelphia band
- Interpreter (album), a 1996 album by Julian Cope
- The Interpreter (album), a 2011 live album by Rhett Miller of Old 97

== Other ==
- Left-brain interpreter, the post-hoc construction of explanations by the brain's left hemisphere

== See also ==
- Interpretation (disambiguation)
- Interpreted language, in computing
