= Hal Harvey =

American energy policy advisor

- Born: 1961 (age 64–65)
- Education: Stanford University (BS); Stanford University (MS)
- Occupations: founder; advisor; activist; author
- Title: CEO

Hal Harvey (born 1961) is an American energy policy advisor. He is the founder of Energy Innovation. Harvey was previously the CEO of ClimateWorks Foundation. He is a co-author of the book The Big Fix.

== Education ==
Harvey has bachelor's and master's degrees in engineering from Stanford University.

== Career & Work ==
Harvey started the Energy Foundation in 1990 and was the CEO of the foundation until 2002. Harvey was the director of the Environment Program at the William and Flora Hewlett Foundation from 2001 to 2008.

Harvey was the inaugural CEO of ClimateWorks Foundation in San Francisco. The foundation grew out of the Design to Win (DTW) document produced by California Environmental Associates. The DTW document laid out certain roles for philanthropy and ClimateWorks Foundation was meant to implement and operationalize what was in the DTW. ClimateWorks Foundation receives most of its funding from the Hewlett Foundation, the David and Lucile Packard Foundation, and the McKnight Foundation. ClimateWorks Foundation gives grants to local foundations across the globe, including in China and India.

In 2004, Harvey worked on the transition team of Governor Arnold Schwarzenegger as a consultant on climate and energy issues.

Harvey co-founded the International Council on Clean Transportation (ICCT) in 2001.

In 2020 Harvey founded the Climate Imperative Foundation.

Harvey was quoted by The New York Times on the implications of California's resolve to take a leading role in fighting climate change when the then President-elect Donald Trump appeared to be planning to make global warming deniers into Cabinet members in the first Trump Administration, apart from Trump himself being sympathetic to global warming deniers. Trump had already indicated that the U.S. would withdraw from the Paris climate agreement under his administration.

Harvey was also quoted by The New York Times saying that then-President Obama's plans to cut greenhouse gas emissions from power plants was going to be "far easier and far faster and far cheaper than most people realize."

Harvey discussed the "four-zero climate solution" on Greg Dalton's Climate One podcast, also featuring Arun Majumdar of the Stanford Doerr School of Sustainability and Kate Gordon. This involves "a zero-emissions electric grid, zero-emission transportation, zero-emission buildings, and zero-waste manufacturing."

Harvey is on the advisory council of the Stanford Doerr School of Sustainability.

Harvey was the CEO of Energy Innovation based in San Francisco. The firm is focused on energy and environmental policy.

== Writing ==
In 2020, Harvey was one of the people who wrote on the topic of the one thing to do right now to help fix America for The New York Times Dealbook as part of their annual event.

Harvey has also written opinion articles in The New York Times with Justin Gillis, who is a consultant and author and covered environmental science with a special focus on climate change at The New York Times for about a decade.

Harvey and Gillis wrote in Grist about the need for citizens to become "climate citizens" rather than being just "climate-conscious consumers." They note that advocacy by millions of citizens in school boards, energy utilities, and local government will help America make the clean energy transition that is needed, and to meet the emissions reductions pledge made by the Biden Administration.

Harvey wrote in Forbes magazine about how California can play a leading role in electric vehicles despite the Trump Administration's stated desire to reverse various Obama Administration climate policies and regulations.

== Books/Publications ==
Harvey and Gillis are co-authors of the book The Big Fix: Seven Practical Steps to Save Our Planet. In an excerpt from the book in Popular Science magazine, Harvey and Gillis note how wind energy was a serious idea even in the 1920s. Stephen Markley has recommended The Big Fix to people who want to know what they can do about climate change.

Harvey is a co-author with Paul Brest of the book Money Well Spent: A Strategic Plan for Smart Philanthropy published by Stanford University Press.

Harvey is a co-author of the book Designing Climate Solutions A Policy Guide for Low-Carbon Energy. The other co-authors of the book are Robbie Orvis of Energy Innovation and Jeffrey Rissman, also of Energy Innovation.

== Awards and recognitions ==
Harvey received the Heinz Award in 2016 in the environment category. These awards were instituted in 1993 by Teresa Heinz of the Heinz Family Foundations.

Harvey is a recipient of the Haagen-Smit Award for 2018 in the policy category. The awards are given annually by the government of California's Air Resources Board in various categories since 2001.
