= Alexander R. Hamilton =

British physicist

Alex Hamilton
- Born: 1967 (age 58–59); London, UK
- Education: University of London; University of Cambridge
- Scientific career
- Fields: Physicist
- Workplaces: University of New South Wales; ARC Centre of Excellence in Future Low-Energy Electronics Technologies (FLEET)
- Doctoral advisor: Michael Pepper; Michael Kelly (physicist)

Alexander Rudolf Hamilton (born 1967) is an English-Australian physicist. He is a Professor in the School of Physics at the University of New South Wales (UNSW). He is notable in the area of experimental condensed matter physics, particularly semiconductor nanofabrication and the study of quantum effects in nanometer scale electronic devices at ultra-low temperatures.

== Education ==
He obtained his BSc in physics from the University of London in 1988, and a PhD, under Michael Pepper and Michael Kelly, from the University of Cambridge in 1993 with a thesis entitled Low Dimensional Transport in Back-Gated Heterostructures.

== Career ==
He was awarded an EPSRC postdoctoral fellowship to continue his work at the Cavendish Laboratory, which led to new understandings of electrical conduction in highly correlated low-dimensional quantum systems. Hamilton moved to the University of New South Wales in 1999, where he was one of the founding members of the ARC Centre of Excellence for Quantum Computer Technology. He managed the quantum measurement program in the centre from 2000-2005, developing techniques for controlling and reading out quantum information in silicon quantum computer devices. In 2005 he moved full-time to the School of Physics, where he leads the Quantum Electronic Devices group, working on quantum transport in semiconductor nanostructures (in particular electron and hole transport in GaAs quantum wires and dots). He was awarded the Australasian Science Prize in 2006, a COSMOS 'Bright Sparks' award in 2007, and an ARC Professorial Fellowship in the same year. In 2012 he was the recipient of an ARC Outstanding Researcher Award, and in 2015 was elected as a Fellow of the American Physical Society.

He served as Deputy Director of the ARC Centre of Excellence in Future Low-Energy Electronics Technologies (FLEET), an Australian research centre developing ultra-low energy electronics based on technologies including topological materials, exciton superfluids, non-equilibrium physics, atomically-thin materials and nanodevice fabrication.

In 2023 he was awarded an inaugural Industry Laureate Fellowship by the Australian Research Council Industry to develop silicon hole spin quantum computer devices https://www.arc.gov.au/funding-research/funding-schemes/linkage-program/arc-industry-fellowships/2023-industry-laureate-profile-scientia-professor-alexander-hamilton.

== See also ==
- Quantum Aspects of Life (book)
