= Raj Aggarwal =

Indian researcher in finance and international business

Raj Aggarwal is an author and contributor to the fields of finance and international business studies. Aggarwal was the dean of the University of Akron College of Business Administration from 2006 until 2009. He was elected as a fellow of the Academy of International Business. He has worked as an engineer, financial analyst, strategic planner, department chair, university budget planner and corporate board member. He has authored or co-authored over a dozen books or monographs and over a hundred scholarly articles that have cited over 5,000 times according to his profile in Google Scholar.

== Biography ==
=== Education ===
Aggarwal received his bachelor's degree in mechanical engineering from the Indian Institutes of Technology in 1968. He then earned his MBA in operations management from Kent State University in 1970, working with Professor James C. Baker, then studied international economics with Professor Harry Johnson at the University of Chicago from 1972 to 1973. He earned his doctorate in corporate finance and international business at Kent State in 1975. In 2000, he became a Chartered Financial Analyst (CFA) charterholder.

=== Scholarly career ===
Aggarwal is the editor of the Journal of Teaching International Business, was the finance area editor for the Journal of International Business Studies and was an editor of Financial Education and Practice, a journal published by the Financial Management Association. He has served on editorial boards of scholarly journals in international business and many journals in finance and economics. In a 2005 issue of the Journal of International Business Studies, Aggarwal was ranked as the most influential scholar in international business literature. He has over 6700 citations with an H-Index of over 40 in Google Scholars.

He has held many elected and appointed leadership positions in academia and in business, including; president of the Eastern Finance Association and the Northeast Ohio Financial Executives International. He has been a consultant to the UN, the World Bank, the US SEC and Fortune 100 companies. He serves on business and non-profit boards including Manco Inc (Duck, LePage, and Loctite brands), Ancora Mutual Funds, Financial Management Association, the Cleveland Council on World Affairs, and the Financial Executive Research Foundation. He is or was on the Board of Directors of Goodwill Industries of Akron, Ohio and the Kent State University Foundation, Kent, Ohio. The Eastern Finance Association elected Raj Aggarwal as their president, and he has been a trustee since 1999. In 2002, Aggarwal co-founded the CIO Forum, which is an invitation only best practices group of large company CIOs in Northeast Ohio with meetings limited to CIOs with no direct reports. Aggarwal has spoken numerous times on WCPN and NPR, including several interviews on NPR affiliate, WCPN concerning the 2008 financial crisis. Additionally, he has been considered an authority on Northeast Ohio's business and financial markets. Finally, Raj Aggarwal's academic leadership is reflected in Hoshino, M., "An Interview with Professor Raj Aggarwal, Department Editor for JIBS", and his business leadership was reflected in, "The Super CFO: Changing Roles of the CFO".

== Academic career ==
Aggarwal was the Frank C. Sullivan Professor of International Business and Finance of the University of Akron College of Business Administration from 2006 to 2013 and was dean for three years. While Aggarwal was serving as dean, the College of Business Administration (CBA) received its first ever ranking of their business program in BusinessWeek, in 2009. Additionally, the CBA received a 'Best Graduate Business School' ranking from The Princeton Review.

=== Major research ===
==== International capital structure ====
The capital structure of a company is the proportion of its assets financed with other people's money, also defined as the proportion of its capitalization financed by long-term debt. Too little debt often means foregoing the tax, monitoring, and other advantages of debt, a less expensive form of capital compared to equity. However, too much debt can expose a company to a higher than acceptable risk of default or not being able to pay its creditors (who can then sue to bankrupt the company). Trade-offs like these become more complicated when companies have operations and debt in many countries. Aggarwal has been writing about this topic for many years, and has demonstrated that average levels of debt used by companies differ in various countries in Asia, Europe, and Latin America. Additionally, he has been able to show that this average proportion of corporate debt varies across national borders depending on a number of factors including the level of disclosure timeliness, institutional trading activities, and enforcement of anti-insider trading laws. Finally, Aggarwal showed that financing activities by the 300 largest banks in the world are determined first by the location (country) of the bank and second by the bank's size itself.

==== Foreign financial risk management ====
Financial risk management takes a new meaning when applied to companies operating internationally with many currencies as currency values can change abruptly and unexpectedly. To combat the associated foreign exchange risks, companies have implemented many of the following tactics and strategies; First, multinational companies have to assess at the individual country and consolidated levels three kinds of foreign exchange exposure for various future time horizons, transactions exposure, accounting exposure, and economic exposure. Once a company has these measures, it can develop policies and hedge these various exposures directly by buying or selling offsetting currencies in spot and futures markets or indirectly by making appropriate offsetting operating changes. Additionally, his research focused on countertrade opportunities that allow MNCs to take money out of restricted countries. Aggarwal began writing about these topics when he discussed the importance of FASB 8 within the multinational corporation's needs.

==== Third World multinational corporations ====
A recent development in the evolution of multinational corporations (MNCs) is that they have started originating in emerging markets. While traditional MNCs from the industrialized countries have used brand names and technology to overcome the liability of foreignness when they invest overseas, there is much interest in understanding how the new MNCs from the emerging economies overcome the liability of being foreign when they invest overseas. Research in this field is important and shows how large companies in emerging markets develop. Especially, how they overcome the liabilities incurred when investing overseas and this research has exposed specific dynamics of these entities. Beginning two decades ago, Aggarwal began writing and researching on this topic. His research began by determining the dynamics and characteristics of MNCs in developing nations. He has also modeled the business-government relations during the process of firm nationalization, which accompany the economic development of several nearly industrialized countries. He has also focused his research on the challenges that Western firms face because of the emergence of multinational corporations from developing countries.
