= Derivative (disambiguation) =

The derivative of a function is the rate of change of the function's output relative to its input value.

Derivative may also refer to:

== Mathematics and economics ==
- Brzozowski derivative in the theory of formal languages
- Covariant derivative, a way of specifying a derivative along tangent vectors of a manifold with a connection.
- Exterior derivative, an extension of the concept of the differential of a function to differential forms of higher degree.
- Formal derivative, an operation on elements of a polynomial ring which mimics the form of the derivative from calculus
- Fréchet derivative, a derivative defined on normed spaces.
- Gateaux derivative, a generalization of the concept of directional derivative in differential calculus.
- Lie derivative, the change of a tensor field (including scalar functions, vector fields and one-forms), along the flow defined by another vector field.
- Radon–Nikodym derivative in measure theory
- Derivative (set theory), a concept applicable to normal functions
- Derivative (graph theory), an alternative term for a line graph
- Derivative (finance), a contract whose value is derived from that of other quantities
- Derivative suit or derivative action, a type of lawsuit filed by shareholders of a corporation

== Science and engineering ==
- Derivative (chemistry), a type of compound which is a product of the process of derivatization
- Derivative (linguistics), the process of forming a new word on the basis of an existing word
- Aeroderivative gas turbine, a mechanical drive gas turbine derived from an aero engine gas turbine

== Other uses ==
- Derivative work, in copyright law, a modification of an original work
  - Fork (software development)
- Derivative (film), a 2005 Turkish film
- Derivative Inc., a spin-off of Side Effects Software, creators of the software Houdini

== See also ==
- Derive (disambiguation)
- Derivation (disambiguation)
- Imitation
- Interpretation (disambiguation)
- Mimicry
