= Translation (disambiguation) =

Translation, from the Latin for "carry across", is the conversion of text from one language to another.

Translation may also refer to:

== Science ==
- Translation studies, the systematic study of the theory, description and application of translation, interpreting, and localization
- Translation (biology), part of the biological process of protein biosynthesis from messenger RNA
- Frequency translation, converting a radio signal from one frequency to another by mixing the input signal with a second signal
  - Broadcast translator, rebroadcasting a radio signal at a different frequency
- Translation (physics), movement that changes the position of an object, moving every point the same distance in the same direction, without rotation, reflection or change in size
- Translation operator, an alternative name for the displacement operator in quantum optics
- Translational research
- Translation (sociology)

== Mathematics ==
- Translation (geometry), moving points the same distance in the same direction
  - Shift operator, a translation within the real line
- Translation (group theory), the operation of multiplying by a group element

== Computing ==
- Address translation
  - Port address translation, allows a single public IP address to be used by many hosts on a private network
  - Network address translation, transceiving network traffic through a router by re-writing the source and/or destination IP addresses
  - Virtual-to-physical address translation
- Program transformation
- The translation phase of a compiler (or, by extension, the entire process of compilation)
- Translate Toolkit, freeware localization toolkit
- Translator (computing), multiple meanings
- Bing Translator, online machine translation service in Bing.com
- Google Translate, online machine translation service in Google
- Translate (Apple), a translation app developed by Apple for their iOS and iPadOS devices

== Literature and entertainment ==
- Translations (play), 1980 play by Brian Friel
- "...In Translation", seventeenth episode of the first season of Lost
- Translate (Sexy Sadie album), 2006 album by Sexy Sadie
- Translation (album), 2020 album by Black Eyed Peas
- Translate (Luke Abbott album), 2020 album by Luke Abbott
- The Translation (short story), 1977 short story by Joyce Carol Oates

== Religion ==
- Translation (relic), the removal of holy objects from one locality to another
- Translation (ecclesiastical), the transfer of a bishop from one diocese or episcopal see to another
- Translation (Mormonism), in the Church of Jesus Christ of Latter-day Saints, the change of a person from mortality to immortality without death

== See also ==
- Translator (disambiguation)
- Conversion (disambiguation)
- Interpretation (disambiguation)
- Transformation (disambiguation)
