= Michael Fuhrer =

Michael S. Fuhrer FAA is a US/Australian physicist recognised internationally as a pioneer in atomically thin (two-dimensional) materials, including graphene and novel topological materials, with expertise in fabrication and characterisation of their electronic and optical properties.

He is founding Director of ARC Centre of Excellence in Future Low-Energy Electronics Technologies (FLEET), an Australian research centre developing ultra-low energy electronics based on technologies including topological materials, exciton superfluids, non-equilibrium physics, atomically thin materials and nanodevice fabrication.

Fuhrer is an Australian Research Council Laureate Fellow.

== Education ==
Fuhrer was educated at the University of Texas at Austin gaining a bachelor's degree in physics in 1990, and at the University of California, Berkeley, gaining a PhD in physics in 1998, under the supervision of Alex Zettl.

== Career and research ==
After postdoctoral research at Berkeley in collaboration with Profs. Paul McEuen, Alex Zettl, Marvin Cohen, and Steven Louie, Fuhrer joined the University of Maryland, College Park as an assistant professor in 2000, from 2009 to 2012 was professor of physics, and from 2009 to 2013 he directed the Center for Nanophysics and Advanced Materials at Maryland. He joined the School of Physics and Astronomy at Monash University, Melbourne Australia as a professor in 2013. He was the founding director of the Monash Centre for Atomically-Thin Materials (founded 2015).

=== Achievements ===
Fuhrer has pioneered the study of the electronic properties of 2D materials, making the first quantitative measurements of the resistivity of graphene due to charged impurities, defects, and phonons, demonstrating the intrinsic conductivity of graphene at room temperature is higher than any other material. He demonstrated the first atomically thin MoS_{2} transistors, and made the first measurements of the minimum conductivity and electron-phonon scattering in topological insulator Bi_{2}Se_{3}. In 2017 he demonstrated that the topological material trisodium bismuthide (Na_{3}Bi) can be manufactured to be as 'electronically smooth' as the highest-quality graphene-based alternative, while maintaining graphene's high electron mobility.

Fuhrer has published over 200 papers cited over 34,000 times, for an h-index of 75. Fifteen of Fuhrer's papers have been cited more than 500 times.

== Honours and awards ==
Fuhrer is a Fellow of the American Association for the Advancement of Science and the American Physical Society, and an Australian Research Council Laureate Fellow. He was elected a Fellow of the Australian Academy of Science in 2023.

== Core expertise ==
Fuhrer's expertise includes:

- The physical electronic properties of atomically thin materials, such as graphene, and their applications
- Development of low energy electronics to boost sustainability outcomes
- Research into ‘topological’ phases of matter, such as topological insulators and topological semimetals, and their application in future electronics
- Topological insulator thin films
- Atomically thin semiconductors, such as monolayer molybdenum disulphide and tungsten disulphide
- scanning probe techniques (scanning tunneling microscopy, atomic force microscopy)
