= Deepak Agnihotri =

Indian cricketer

Personal information
- Full name: Deepak Agnihotri

Deepak Agnihotri was an Indian cricketer who played for Himachal Pradesh.

Agnihotri made a single first-class appearance for the side, during the 1992–93 season, against Haryana. From the tailend, he scored 1 not out in the first innings in which he batted, and a duck in the second.

Agnihotri bowled 25 overs in the match, taking three wickets.
