= Psychology of religious conversion =

The modern academic study of the psychology of religious conversion can be tracked back to 1881 when a series of lectures was delivered by early psychologist G. Stanley Hall. In its early stages the psychology of religious conversion mainly addressed Christianity and to this day is dominated by studies of North American Protestant Christianity, although other varieties of religion are addressed in the field of psychology of religion.

== Theories of conversion ==
=== Rambo's Integrative Model ===
Rambo provides a model for conversion that classifies it as a highly complex process that is hard to define. He views it as a process of religious change that is affected by an interaction of numerous events, experiences, ideologies, people, institutions, and how these different experiences interact and accumulate over time. From his research Rambo created an integrative model for conversion that occurs over seven stages.

Stage of process	Factors that must be assessed in this stage
Stage 1: Context	Factors that facilitate or hinder conversion
Stage 2: Crisis	May be personal, social, or both
Stage 3: Quest	Intentional activity on part of potential convert
Stage 4: Encounter	Recognition of other R/S option
Stage 5: Interaction	Extended engagement with new R/S option
Stage 6: Commitment	Identification with new R/S reality
Stage 7: Consequences	Transformation of beliefs, behaviors, or identity as result of new commitment

=== Classic paradigm ===
The classic religious paradigm for conversion is highly dependent on the idea of sudden conversion. The prototypical sudden conversion is the Biblical depiction of the conversion of Paul on the road to Damascus. Sudden conversions are highly emotional but not necessarily rational. In these instances the convert is a passive agent being acted upon by external forces, and the conversion entails a dramatic transformation of self. Emotion dominates this dramatic, irrational transformation leading to a shift in self and belief, with behavior change to follow. For sudden converts conversion is not a back and forth drawn out process, but rather happens in one single instance and is permanent thereafter. Typically sudden conversions occur in childhood and are exceptionally emotional experiences. Often sudden conversions are the result of overwhelming anxiety and guilt from sin that becomes unbearable, making conversion a functional solution to ease these emotions.

Emotional factors have been found to correlate with sudden conversions. Coe maintains these correlations seem to suggest causation, citing his work in which 17 sudden converts had dominant emotional factors affecting their conversion. However, Spellman, Baskett, and Byrnes data suggest emotional factors are frequetly not a cause for sudden conversion. In their work they found that sudden converts only scored high on levels of emotionality following conversion, not prior to. No experimental or longitudinal studies have demonstrated a true causal relationship between emotion and sudden conversion.

=== Contemporary paradigm ===
The contemporary paradigm of conversion views the conversion process as a highly intellectual, well thought out gradual process. This contemporary model is a contrast to the classic model, and gradual conversion has been identified by Strickland as a contrast to sudden conversion. Scobie terms it an "unconscious conversion". Typically gradual conversions do not occur following a single, impactful event but rather are distinguished empirically and thoughtfully over a length of time. A gradual conversion can be identified by consciously striving toward the goal with no decisive point where conversion is initiated or converted. The process occurs cognitively and is much less emotional with no emotional crisis, guilt, or sin.

== Age of conversion ==
The average age at the time of conversion has been examined by Johnson, Roberts, and Gillespie and has been found to be between the ages of 15 and 16, a consistent finding over 40 years. These findings are consistent with Erikson's conclusion that this is the age where individuals are testing the world around them and forming an identity. However, it has been pointed out by Silverstein that sampling is generally biased as participant age rarely exceeds the early 20s. Spilka and others suggest that better sampling is needed as generally study participants are college-age students and thus are not truly representative. Finally, in Western countries women typically convert one to two years younger than men.

== Criticism ==
Brian Zinnbauer and Kenneth Pargament argue that scholarship has largely failed to explain the process of conversion and the consequences of it due to failure to distinguish between different types of conversion, failure to distinguish between religious conversions and nonreligions changes in ideology or non-conversion changes in religion, and mixed results from studies..

== Deconversion ==
Research of conversion is paralleled to a lesser extent by research on deconversion. Research on deconversion has been divided into two subgroups, new religious movements (NRM) and mainstream groups.

=== New religious movements ===
There are many reasons why people deconvert from new religious movements. A key factor to consider is that many times a NRM occurs in isolation from the outside world; when this isolation is broken deconversion may occur. NRM typically regulate interpersonal relationships, as the development of unregulated interpersonal relationships may lead to deconversion. Followers of a NRM may become frustrated when their efforts produce no success or social change and eventually abandon the movement. Finally, followers may become disillusioned with the movement or its leader and leave the movement.

Deconversion may occur suddenly or be a gradual process. Generally deconversion will be a quiet process for those who have only been a member of the NRM for one year or less. However, for those who have been a follower for longer than a year tend to go through confrontational, emotional, and dramatic deconversion processes.

=== Mainstream ===
A minority of mainstream religious followers truly reject their faith and deconvert. Apostates make up just 7% of deconversions from mainstream religion. However, 80% will withdraw and later return.

Generally there are two disengagement measures for the mainstream religious. In the first, behavioral, followers will go one month or longer without attending a religious service. The second type of disengagement, belief, sees followers go for a year or longer without religion being a part of their life.

== Closely related phenomena ==
=== Apostasy ===
Apostasy is an individual's abandonment of their religious commitment and acceptance of a nonreligious lifestyle or joining a different movement of belief.

=== Deconversion ===
Deconversion is the process by which converts leave their faith.

=== Intensification ===
A revitalized commitment to a religion. This may be to a religion that one was brought up in or has only casually followed. Also referred to as "born again" or a "rebirth". In some religions the faithful follow procedures designed to induce experiences of intensification.

=== Switching ===
Changing religious identification group without radically changing as a person. An example would be switching religious denomination.

=== Cycling ===
Varying religious participation across an individual's lifetime. Individual may drop out of religion to later return, or periodically fall out of the faith.

== See also ==
- Radicalization
