= Navalkishore Dogra =

Indian cricketer (born 1973)

Personal information
- Born: 5 October 1973 (age 52); Hamirpur, Himachal Pradesh

Navalkishore Dogra (born 5 October 1973) was an Indian cricketer. He was a right-handed batsman and right-arm off-break bowler who played for Himachal Pradesh. He was born in Hamirpur.

Dogra made his List A debut for the team during the 1996–97 season, against Haryana, against whom he scored two runs. He made one further List A appearance for the side, two weeks later, in which he scored 45 runs, the highest total of any individual in the team.
