= Raj K. Aggarwal =

Anglo-Indian businessman (born 1949)

Captain Raj K. Aggarwal OBE DL RNR FRPharmS
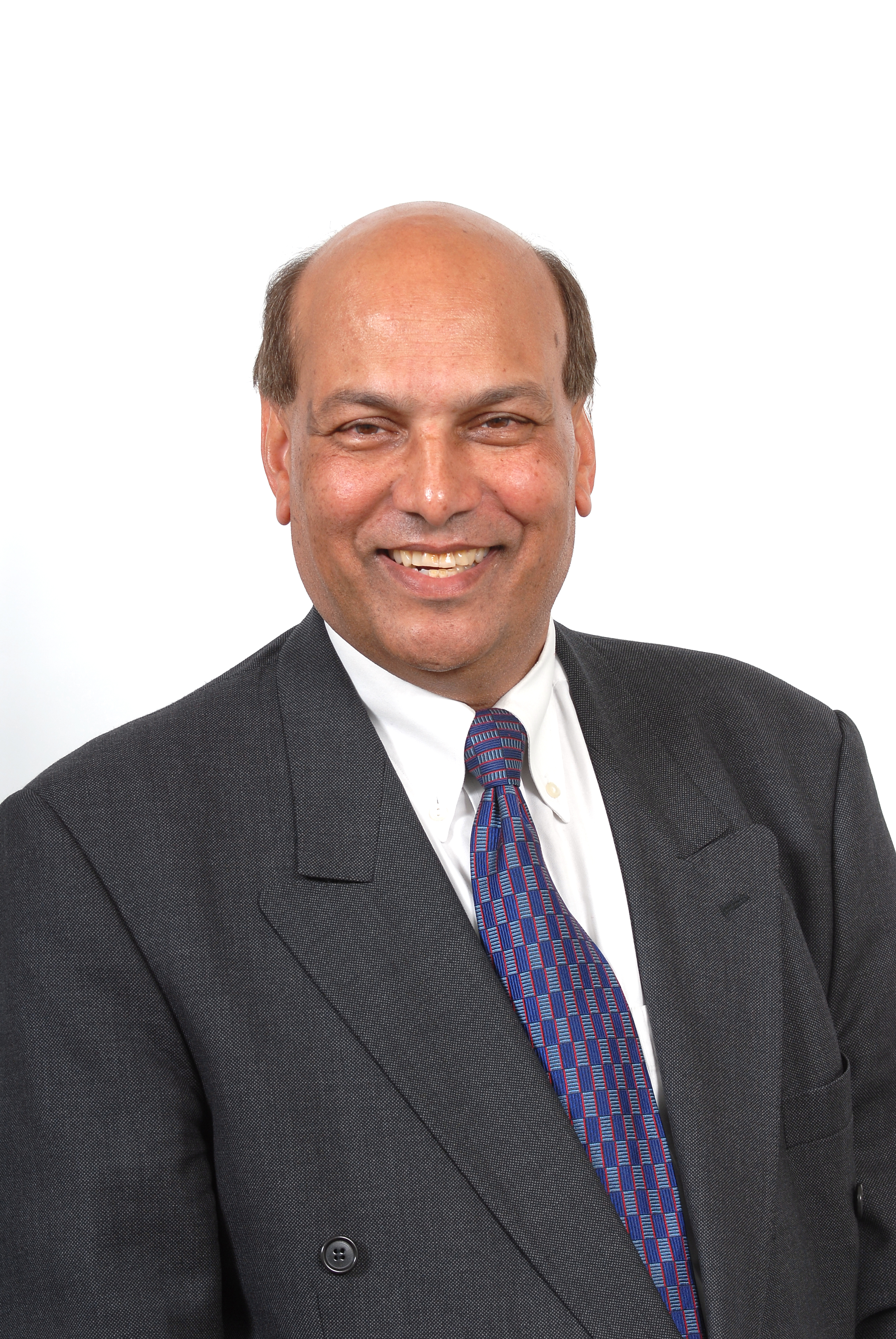
- Born: 28 April 1949 (age 77); Nairobi, Kenya
- Occupations: Businessman, pharmacist, public health expert, President of the Consular Association for Wales and Indian Honorary Consul for Wales, Honorary Captain in Royal Navy
- Children: Rakesh Aggarwal, Ashu Aggarwal
- Website: Company Website

Raj Kumar Aggarwal OBE DL (born 1949) is a Kenya-born Welsh pharmacist, public health expert, businessman and the first ever Honorary Consul for India with jurisdiction for Wales. In this role, he is responsible for helping to further links between Welsh and Indian business, educational establishments and cultural organisations, as well as looking after the needs of Indian nationals living and working in Wales. In March 2015, he was appointed president of the Consular Association of Wales.

As chairman of Kidney Wales Foundation, Aggarwal campaigned and provided evidence from 2007 onwards for a deemed consent or 'soft opt out' to increase the number of organs available for transplantation and save lives. The Human Transplantation Wales Act received Royal Assent on 10 September 2013. The law came into effect on 1 December 2015. In its first year the number of patients waiting for organ donation dropped 38% from 309 in 2010/11 to 193 in 2015/16 and it was said to represent "considerable progress". In December 2017 Theresa May called for a public consultation to extend the "opt out" law to England in order to reduce organ donation waiting lists.

He has been a member of the Royal Pharmaceutical Society of Great Britain since 1973, appointed a Fellow of the Royal Pharmaceutical Society in November 2013. In June 2007, Aggarwal was made an OBE in the Queen's Birthday Honours List in recognition of his contribution to the pharmaceutical industry and the life of the Asian community in Wales. Roy Thomas, chief Executive of the Kidney Wales charity, told the Western Mail: "He is a very modest man but the honour is more than deserved. He has promoted the need for diversity in business. The Welsh and Asian communities should be proud of him and what he has achieved."

He is a lay member of the Governing Body of Cardiff University and a board member of the Wales Millennium Centre. In October 2011, Aggarwal was appointed Deputy Lieutenant for South Glamorgan. As well as English, he speaks Swahili, Hindi, Punjabi, Gujarati and Urdu.

== Early days ==
Aggarwal was educated at the Duke of Gloucester Grammar School in Nairobi, Kenya, before his family emigrated to Wales in 1967. He studied A-Levels at Bath College, Somerset, from 1967 to 1969, then won a place at the Welsh School of Pharmacy at Cardiff University from 1969 to 1972. He graduated with a B.Pharms (Hons) 2.1 in Pharmacology and joined Boots UK as a graduate trainee. He rose to become one of the company's youngest-ever regional managers, looking after high-profile stores including Oxford Street, London.

On a social visit to Cardiff in 1982, he was introduced to a pharmacy on City Road and decided that he would rather run his own business rather than work for someone else. Resigning from Boots, he bought this first shop. Over the next decade, Aggarwal built up a chain of six pharmacies, and a significant business, in and around Cardiff. In 2008 Central Pharmacy, which Aggarwal still owns and operates, was awarded the Best in UK Clarins Gold Salons Award. He believes the key to good business is in customer service, telling Pharmacy Business (9 March 2011): "I enjoy what I do. I have a lot of happiness in what we achieve. I've always had a strong head for business and I enjoy leadership and keeping customer service levels high. We want to make customers feel how we would want to feel."

In 2010 Aggarwal was named UK 2010 Pharmacy Business Entrepreneur of the Year. The award was presented by then Secretary of State for Health Andrew Lansley MP.

== Advocate for community pharmacies ==
Aggarwal has been a staunch advocate of the benefits of community pharmacies and the support and advice they can provide to patients.

In November 2009, he wrote: "The community pharmacy network in Wales is made up of more than 700 pharmacies, ranging from the small independent pharmacy to the larger branches of well-known chains. They are located where people work, shop and live and to many they are the most accessible part of the health service. We are all aware of the role the pharmacy plays in providing patients with 60 million-plus prescription medicines every year. But, over the years, more and more people have been recognising community pharmacies as sources of help and advice – particularly about how to lead a healthier lifestyle – and a provider of health checks."

He has also written about the high cost to the public purse for wasted prescription medicines in Wales – that "costs the NHS an estimated £50million a year; enough to fund 350 nurses, 200 hip operations and more than 1,000 coronary bypass operations" – and urged health officials to place more trust in pharmacists, writing: "Wales has the highest prescribing rate per head of population in the UK – 22 items compared to 16 in England – meaning this is a serious issue for the Assembly Government to sort out. There are more than 700 pharmacies across Wales situated where people work, shop and live. The pharmacists working in these businesses are at the heart of decisions about the prescription and dispensing of medicines. They daily interface with prescribers, practice managers, care-home managers and patients and there is not a day that goes by when they do not identify issues which can result in ineffective or inappropriate use of medicines."

He is also an advocate of free prescriptions, writing os the "inherent inequity" of the exemption system for prescription charges.

He is board member of the National Pharmacy Association and of Community Pharmacy Wales [Chairman, South East Region]. He is also a Welsh Government-appointed advisor on various Health and Pharmaceutical Committees, formal member of the Ministerial Pharmacy Strategic Delivery Group, and a board member of Bro-Taf Drug and Therapeutics Committee.

In May 2011 he was presented with the "Outstanding Contribution to Pharmacy" award by Community Pharmacy Wales, acknowledging his contribution to Welsh Pharmacy and to his tireless work within the charity sector.

In October 2022 he was awarded the "Lifetime Achievement Award" at the 2022 Pharmacy Business Awards for his four decades of working in community pharmacies which has "contributed profoundly to the profession.

== Charity and community work ==
Aggarwal has been chairman (since 2007) and a trustee (since 2002) of the Kidney Wales Foundation. In June 2011 he was appointed as a Trustee of the Wales Millennium Centre. He was a fundraising committee member of the George Thomas Hospice, that provides specialist home-based nursing and practical advice, emotional and spiritual support, medical equipment, therapies and treatments for cancer patients.

== Honorary Consul for India ==
Aggarwal has been a staunch advocate for increasing business links between Wales and other nations, especially India. India is the UK's fourth largest inward investor, creating 5,889 jobs over the past year. It accounts for around 6% of exports from Wales, worth around £100m. According to the Assembly Government there are more than 2,000 Indian students at Welsh universities. Taking part in a US-Indian-Welsh business symposium in March 2011, Aggarwal said: "Ensuring a commercial link with India and continued investment relations is essential if Wales is to grow on the international stage."

In September 2012, Aggarwal was appointed to the role by India's High Commissioner Dr Jaimini Bhagwati during a ceremony at Cardiff's India Centre. Talking to the South Wales Echo, Aggarwal: "This is a special privilege that I and my family will always cherish. Wales is a dynamic small country and stronger links with the rising superpower that is India will be vital to its future prosperity. I’ll work tirelessly to build a deeper engagement between the two countries to which I and many Welsh people owe their allegiance." .

Welsh First Minister Carwyn Jones said of the appointment: "Raj isn’t only a personal friend to me but also to Wales. He’s been a tireless advocate for promoting our country as a place to invest and do business and travelled with me to India earlier this year to highlight what we have to offer to Indian companies. I know his appointment as Honorary Consul to Wales will be of great pride to him and I am sure he will do an excellent job."

In March 2015, at the organisation's Annual General Meeting, Aggarwal was appointed president of the Consular Association of Wales. The role involves working closely with the UK Government, the National Assembly for Wales and the Welsh Government. Aggarwal told Wales Online: "I hope to show all the amazing strengths and fantastic attributes of Wales and its people, its commerce, education, tourism and cultural endeavours."

He is a Patron of the Hindu Council of Wales and the Sikh Council of Wales and was involved in years of fundraising to erect a 6 ft bronze statue of Mahatma Gandhi near the Wales Millennium Centre in Cardiff. Raj gave a speech at the unveiling ceremony on 2 October 2017, the 148th anniversary of Gandhi's birth which was also attended by Gandhi's grandson Mr Satishkumar Dhupelia, other Indian diplomats, First Minister Carwyn Jones and Vimla Patel, Chair of the Hindu Council of Wales.

== Royal Navy ==
In September 2018 Raj Aggarwal became the first Indian-heritage honorary officer in the Royal Navy.

At the time he said: Raj said: “It is my great honour to accept this position in the Royal Navy as one of the honorary officers. I want to use this position to create greater diversity in the Navy, to show the community that the Navy will be supportive and that there are amazing careers on offer with first rate skills training and opportunities to see the world.”

Since 2018 he been promoted twice and in March 2020 was given the rank of honorary Captain at an event in Birmingham by First Sea Lord Admiral Sir Tony Radakin.

The First Sea Lord said: "Since Raj's appointment as an Honorary Officer he has been a tireless advocate for the Service and this promotion reflects his commitment and hard work. A particular highlight was seeing his affiliated ship, HMS Dragon, lit up at sea to celebrate Diwali, in an image that reached audiences throughout the world."

== Appointments and honours ==
- Officer of the Most Excellent Order of the British Empire (OBE)
- Honorary Consul for India with jurisdiction for Wales
- Deputy Lieutenant for South Glamorgan (DL)
- Member of the Governing Body (The council) of Cardiff University
- Member of the board of the Wales Millennium Centre
- Member of the board of the National Pharmaceutical Association
- Member of the board of the Cardiff Business Club
- Member of the board of the Welsh International Business Council
- Chairman of Kidney Wales Foundation and Donate Wales
- Chairman of Community Pharmacy Wales
- Granted Coat of Arms by College of Arms
- Honorary Fellowship from Cardiff Metropolitan University
- Honorary Fellowship from University of South Wales
- Appointed Fellow of Royal Pharmaceutical Society
- President of Consular Association of Wales
- Institute of Directors Awards - Directors' Award winner 2019
- Granted an honorary commission by Royal Navy to the position of Honorary Lieutenant Commander on 16 September 2018, the first Indian born recipient of such an honour.
- Granted an honorary Captaincy by Royal Navy in March 2020.
