= Tikam Singh =

Indian cricketer

Tikam Singh (born 28 January 1968) was an Indian cricketer. He was a right-handed batsman who played for Himachal Pradesh. He was born in Solan.

Singh, who made his cricketing debut for the Under-15 team in 1983, made a single first-class appearance for the side, during the 1993–94 season, against Haryana. He scored 2 not out in the first innings in which he batted, and 14 runs in the second, in a match which Himachal Pradesh lost by an innings margin.

Singh is captain of the Senior Indian tennis team. He captained the Indian team in Portugal (Lisbon) in 2018 and Germany (Ulm) in 2019.
