= Sudarshan K. Aggarwal =

Indian medical doctor and radiologist (born 1935)

- Born: 1935 (age 90–91); Lahore, Punjab, British India
- Occupation: Radiologist
- Parent: Diwan Chand Aggarwal
- Awards: Padma Shri; Beclere Medal; Gösta Forssell Award; J. C. Bose Oration Award; K. R. Gupta Lifetime Achievement Award

Sudarshan Kumar Aggarwal (born 1935) is an Indian medical doctor and radiologist. He was honoured by the Government of India, in 2013, by bestowing on him the Padma Shri, the fourth highest civilian award, for his contributions to the field of medicine.

== Biography ==
Sudarshan K. Aggarwal was born in 1935, as the youngest son of Dr. Diwan Chand Aggarwal, one of the pioneers of radiology in India, and a member of the British Institute of Radiology, at Lahore in the British India. He graduated in medicine from Amristsar Medical College, Punjab University in 1957 and secured the post graduate degree of DMRD from London in 1961. He also obtained further degrees such as FRCR in 1986 from England, FACR in 1996 from the US and FRSM from the UK, the same year. He had several training stints at various European hospitals viz. Middlesex Hospital, London, under Sir Bryan Windyer and Dr. F. C. Golding, the Western Regional Hospital in Glasgow, Scotland, the Karolinska Hospital in Stockholm, Sweden, and the Ullevel Hospital in Oslo, Norway, under Professor Frimann Dahl.

Aggarwal started his practice at the Diwan Chand Aggarwal Imaging Centre and Research Centre, run by his elder brother, Dr. S. P. Aggarwal, in 1959, specializing in Gastrointestinal and Uroradiology and took over the management of the centre in 1989, on the death of his brother. Over the years, he has contributed to making the Diwan Chand Aggarwal Imaging Centre and Research Centre, a post graduate study centre, recognized by the National Board of Examinations.

Aggarwal has co-authored a three volume book, Diagnostic Radiology and Imaging.

- Kakarla Subbarao; Samir Banerjee; Sudarshan K. Aggarwal; Satish K. Bhargava (1 January 2003). Diagnostic Radiology and Imaging - Vol. 1 to 3. Jaypee Brothers Medical Publishers. p. 1441. ISBN 978-8180610691.

He has also published over 50 articles in Indian and international journals. Sudarshan K. Aggarwal lives in New Delhi, attending to his duties at the Diwan Chand Satyapal Aggarwal Imaging Research Centre.

== Positions ==
Aggarwal is the founding editor of the Asian Oceanian Journal of Radiology. and is a member of the editorial boards of two known journals, Abdominal Imaging and the Indian Journal of Radiology and Imaging

- "Asian Oceanian Journal of Radiology". Find an Expert. 2014. ISSN 0972-2688.
- "Abdominal Imaging". Journal. Springer. 2014. ISSN 0942-8925.
- "Indian Journal of Radiology and Imaging". Research Gate. 2014. ISSN 0971-3026. OCLC 123401890.

Sudarshan Aggarwal was the President of the Indian Radiological and Imaging Association in 1989. and the organizing secretary of the 6th Asian Oceanian Congress of Radiology (1991) and the 20th International Congress of Radiology. He is a member of the Governing Council of the Devki Devi Foundation, a healthcare provider, based in Delhi.

Some of the important positions held by Dr. Aggarwal are:

- Consultant - US Embassy Nursing Home, New Delhi
- National Professor of Medicine and Allied Science - IMA College of General Practitioners
- Founder President - SAARC Society of Radiologists

== Awards and recognitions ==
Aggarwal has received many awards and recognitions such as the Beclere Medal by the International Society of Radiology and the J. C. Bose Oration by the Indian Radiological and Imaging Association. He is also a recipient of the Gösta Forssell Award of the Swedish Academy of Radiology. The Government of India honoured Dr. Aggarwal with the Padma Shri, in 2013. A year later, he received the K. R. Gupta Lifetime Achievement Award by the Indian Radiological and Imaging Association (IRIA). The other honours received by Dr. Aggarwal are:

- Lifetime achievement award - International Congress of Radiology - 1998
- Radiologist of the Millennium - Indian Radiological Association and Indian Medical Association
- Fellow of the Royal College of Radiologists (UK)
- Fellow of the American College of Radiology
- Fellow of the Royal College of Physicians and Surgeons, Edinburgh
- Fellow of the National Academy of Medical Sciences,
- Fellow of the Indian College of Radiology
- Fellow of the Royal Society of Medicine, London
- Honorary member - Radiological Society of North America
- Honorary member - Radiological Society of Italy
- Honorary member - Radiological Society of Sweden
- Honorary member - International Relations Committee - European Society of Radiology
- Honorary member - European Congress of Radiology
- Honorary member - European Association of Radiology

== See also ==
- Radiology
