= Kaunik Acharya =

Indian cricketer

Personal information
- Full name: Kaunik Acharya
- Born: Himachal Pradesh

Kaunik Acharya is an Indian former cricketer who played for Himachal Pradesh.

== Career ==
Acharya made two first-class appearances for the side, during the 1991–92 season, his debut coming against Delhi, against whom he scored 8 and 15, and took one catch, that of centurion Bhaskar Pillai. Acharya's second and final appearance came the following week, against Haryana, a match which also finished in an innings defeat for Himachal Pradesh, in which he scored 28 runs in the first innings in which he batted, and a duck in the second.
