= Adapter (disambiguation) =

Adapter or adaptor may refer to:

- Adapter a device used to match the physical or electrical characteristics of two different objects
- AC adapter, an electric power supply device
- Adapter (genetics), a small DNA molecule used in genetic engineering
- Adapter (rocketry), a segment between rocket stages
- Adapter (computing), used to connect various hardware devices
- Adapter (piping), a short length of pipe with two different ends
- Adapter pattern, a software design pattern used for computer programming
- Signal transducing adaptor protein, a type of protein involved in cell signalling
- Blank-firing adaptor, a device which enables automatic firearms to fire blanks
- Diving cylinder adapter, a diving accessory for interfacing different equipment
- Adapter, a type of hand movement in nonverbal communication

== See also ==
- Gender of connectors and fasteners, relevant to adapters with male and female connections
- Coupling, a mechanical connection between two objects
- Electrical connector, often the subject of an electrical adapter
