= Amandeep =

Indian cricketer

Personal information
- Full name: Amandeep

Amandeep (date of birth unknown) was an Indian cricketer who played one first-class match in 1998. He made his sole appearance for Himachal Pradesh against Delhi at the Feroz Shah Kotla ground in the North Zone division of the 1996–97 Ranji Trophy competition, scoring eight runs at number seven in the batting order in his team's first innings and a duck batting at number nine in the second innings.
