= Equitable conversion =

Equitable conversion is a doctrine of the law of real property under which a purchaser of real property becomes the equitable owner of title to the property at the time they sign a contract binding them to purchase the land at a later date. The seller retains legal title of the property prior to the date of conveyance, but this land interest is considered personal property (a right to the payment of money, rather than a right to the property). The risk of loss is then transferred to the buyer – if a house on the property burns down after the contract has been signed, but before the deed is conveyed, the buyer will nevertheless have to pay the agreed-upon purchase price for the land unless the seller in possession or deemed in possession has failed to protect it. Such issues can and should be avoided by parties by stipulating in the contract who will bear the loss in such occurrences. The above rule varies by jurisdiction, but is the general rule.

== Effect of death of a party ==
If one of the parties dies after the contract for sale of the property has been executed, the doctrine will govern how that party's interest will pass to their heirs. For example, the seller wills their real property to their son, and their personal property to their daughter. If the seller dies after a contract for conveyance is signed by a buyer, the seller's interest in the land will be treated as personal property, and the proceeds of the sale will pass to their daughter. In most jurisdictions, the real property interest created by the contract will pass to the buyer's heirs, while the seller's personal property interest created by the contract will pass to the seller's estate.

The State of New York does not recognize equitable conversion. In New York, as long as the buyer is without fault, the risk of loss remains on the seller until the buyer takes title or possession.

== Uniform Vendor and Purchaser Risk Act ==
A growing minority of States have adopted the Uniform Vendor and Purchaser Risk Act (UVPRA) in one form or another. The UVPRA bases the legal consequences of no-fault casualty loss on the right of possession of the property at the time the loss occurs. See Brush Grocery Kart v. Sure Fine Market, 47 P. 3d 680 (Colo. 2002). Generally, the provisions of the UVPRA can be modified or avoided in the Land Sale Contract.

== The "Massachusetts Rule" ==
In Massachusetts and a handful of other states, the seller continues to bear the risk until the title is actually transferred to the buyer, unless there is an agreement to the contrary. See Brush Grocery Kart v. Sure Fine Market, 47 P. 3d 680 (Colo. 2002).
