= ARC Centre of Excellence in Future Low-Energy Electronics Technologies =

ARC Centre of Excellence in Low Energy Electronics Technologies (FLEET)
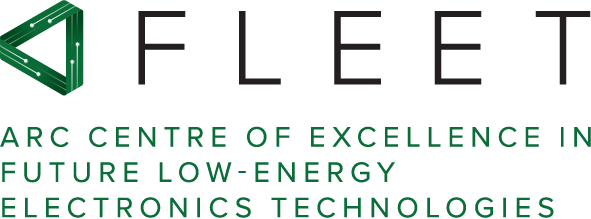
- Project type: Physics, chemistry, materials science, electrical engineering, condensed matter physics, nanotechnology
- Funding agency: Australian Research Council
- Objective: Ultra low energy electronics for the IT sector
- Location: Australia
- Project manager: Michael Fuhrer
- Participants: Monash University, Australian National University, the University of New South Wales, the University of Queensland, RMIT University, the University of Wollongong and Swinburne University of Technology
- Partners: Australian Synchrotron, University of Colorado at Boulder, ANSTO, Tsinghua University, University of Würzburg, University of Texas at Austin, Caltech, Columbia University in the City of New York, Joint Quantum Institute at University of Maryland, National University of Singapore and Max Planck Institute of Quantum Optics
- Budget: Funding: $33,400,000
- Website: www.fleet.org.au

The ARC Centre of Excellence in Future Low-Energy Electronics Technologies (or FLEET) was a collaboration of physicists, electrical engineers, chemists and material scientists from seven Australian universities developing ultra-low energy electronics aimed at reducing energy use in information technology (IT). The Centre was funded in the 2017 ARC funding round.

== Aims ==
FLEET aimed to develop a new generation of ultra-low resistance electronic devices, capitalising on Australian research in atomically thin materials, topological materials, exciton superfluids and nanofabrication.

== Programmes ==
FLEET's research pursued three broad research themes to develop devices in which electrical current can flow without resistance:

- Topological insulators: a relatively new class of materials and recognised by the 2016 Nobel Prize in Physics, topological insulators conduct electricity only along their edges, and strictly in one direction. This one-way path conducts electricity without loss of energy due to resistance. Approaches being used within FLEET to study topological materials include magnetic topological insulators and quantum anomalous Hall effect (QAHE), topological Dirac semimetals (including oxide ‘antiperovskites’) and artificial topological systems (artificial graphene and 2D topological insulators).
- Exciton superfluids: a quantum state known to achieve electrical current flow with minimal wasted dissipation of energy. FLEET aims to develop superfluid devices that operate at room temperature, without the need for expensive, energy-intensive cooling. Approaches being used within FLEET’s include exciton–polariton bosonic condensation in atomically thin materials, topologically-protected exciton–polariton flow, and exciton superfluids in twin-layer materials.
- Light-transformed materials: a material can be temporarily forced into a new state by applying an intense light beam. FLEET aims to study the fundamental physics behind this temporary state change. Approaches being pursued in FLEET include optically-induced Floquet topological states (topological states that change with time), nonequilibrium superfluidity and creation of topological states in multi-dimensional extensions of the kicked quantum rotor.

These approaches are enabled by the following two technologies:

- Atomically thin materials: FLEET seeks to find new ways of controlling the properties of two-dimensional materials via synthesis, substrates, and tuning electric and magnetic ordering.
- Nanodevice fabrication: FLEET aims to work on new techniques to integrate novel atomically thin materials into high-quality device structures with suitable performance.

== Participants ==
FLEET is an Australian initiative, headquartered at Monash University, and in conjunction with the Australian National University, the University of New South Wales, the University of Queensland, RMIT University, the University of Wollongong and Swinburne University of Technology, complemented by a group of Australian and international partners. It is funded by the Australian Research Council and by the member universities.

FLEET's Director is Michael Fuhrer, who is an ARC Laureate Fellow in the School of Physics and Astronomy at Monash University studying two-dimensional materials (of which graphene is the most well known example), and topological insulators. Deputy Director is Alexander Hamilton at the University of New South Wales.

FLEET partners include Australian Nuclear Science and Technology Organisation, the Australian Synchrotron, California Institute of Technology, Columbia University in the City of New York, Johannes Gutenberg University at Mainz, University of Maryland Joint Quantum Institute & National Institute of Standards and Technology, Max Planck Institute of Quantum Optics, the National University of Singapore, the University of Colorado Boulder, University of Maryland Center for Nanophysics and Advanced Materials, the University of Texas at Austin, Tsinghua University at Beijing, and the University of Würzburg in Germany.
