= Rakesh Aggarwal =

British businessman (born 1975)

- Born: Rakesh Aggarwal; 16 August 1975 (age 50); Cardiff, Wales
- Occupation: Internet retailing
- Father: Raj K Aggarwal
- Website: Escentual.com

Rakesh Aggarwal (born 1975), is a Welsh businessman and founder of the internet cosmetics retailer Escentual.com.

== Early life ==
Aggarwal is the son of Raj K. Aggarwal (India's honorary consul in Wales), and Mrs Usha Aggarwal. His father left Kenya in the 1960s to settle in the UK, and after training as a pharmacist, ran a chemists shop in Cardiff. Aggarwal's grandfather was a businessman in Kenya.

Aggarwal grew up in Cardiff and attended The Cathedral School, Llandaff before moving to Malvern College as a boarder. After A-levels at Malvern, he studied pharmacy at King's College London, but halted his studies in the second year and returned to Wales. He then enrolled on Cardiff University's MBA course, graduating with a distinction in 1999.

== Escentual ==
In 2000, Aggarwal took an e-commerce course and then spent £5,000 on design before launching Escentual.com from his parents' garage. Escentual.com took its first order in November 2000.

In 2011, Escentual.com posted sales of more than £10 million and won the Beauty, Perfume & Cosmetics category at the Online Retail Awards. By 2012, the business was being described as "the Amazon of online beauty" by Moneyweek. At that point, Escentual.com employed 16 full-timers as well as part-time picking and packing staff. According to Retail Gazette, the firm's turnover for 2014–2015 was £14m. In the 12 months to March 2015, Escentual shipped 300,000 orders from over 200 brands. As a result of its growth, Escentual.com moved to a bigger warehouse in Cardiff's Ocean Park. The move, predicted to create 100 new jobs, was backed by the Welsh Government. Economy Minister Edwina Hart said: "The significant number of jobs the company is creating illustrates the important role that entrepreneurs play in the economy ... I am pleased its growth plans will be taking place in Wales."

Aggarwal has insisted that Wales, and Cardiff in particular, has been integral to the company's success. He told The Western Mail: "We find the environment here in Cardiff conducive to, and supportive of, business." He has also credited social media with helping customers interact and keep abreast of developments with the company. Alexandra "Binky" Felstead from the augmented reality TV show Made in Chelsea is a beauty ambassador and blogger on behalf of Escentual.com.

In 2015, in association with London Metropolitan University, Escentual.com commissioned research into the risks posed by out-of-date make-up. Laboratory tests, on foundation, blusher, lipstick and lip gloss that had passed their sell-by date found that they contained dangerous levels of enterococcus faecalis – the bacteria responsible for meningitis and septicaemia. Researchers also found staphlyoccocus epidermidis, propionibacterium, and enterobacter, which causes urinary and respiratory tract infections. Speaking to The Daily Express, Aggarwal said: "This research has even surprised us and has shown that there is a serious health risk here."

Other analytics, published by Escentual.com, were reported to show a rise in online sales whenever England were playing in European football matches, suggesting that – while their partners watched the games – women were opting to shop online instead.

Aggarwal has said that his approach was inspired by his grandfather, who was a businessman in Kenya. He told journalist Chloe Rigby: “The adage my grandfather used to tell me was: quality, service and satisfaction."

== Other interests ==
In 2015, Aggarwal was elected a trustee of Cardiff University Students Union. Aggarwal will serve a four-year term focusing on issues of governance, strategy and finance. Aggarwal was elected vice chairman of the Cosmetic & Perfumery Retailers Association (COPRA) in April 2015.
