= List of FASB Interpretations =

FASB Interpretations are published by the Financial Accounting Standards Board (FASB). They extend or explain existing standards (primarily published in Statements of Financial Accounting Standards). Interpretations are a part of the U.S. Generally accepted accounting principles (US GAAP). 48 interpretations have been published as of September 2006.

No.	Title	Issue Date	Changes (note: para. stands for paragraph)
1.	Accounting Changes Related to the Cost of Inventory—an interpretation of APB Opinion No. 20	June 1974	None
2.	Imputing Interest on Debt Arrangements Made under the Federal Bankruptcy Act—an interpretation of APB Opinion No. 21	June 1974	Superseded by FASB Statement 15, para. 10
3.	Accounting for the Cost of Pension Plans Subject to the Employee Retirement Income Security Act of 1974—an interpretation of APB Opinion No. 8	Dec. 1974	Superseded by FASB Statement 87, para. 9
4.	Applicability of FASB Statement No. 2 to Business Combinations Accounted for by the Purchase Method—an interpretation of FASB Statement No. 2	Feb. 1975	Amended
5.	Applicability of FASB Statement No. 2 to Development Stage Enterprises—an interpretation of FASB Statement No. 2	Feb. 1975	Superseded by FASB Statement 7, para. 6
6.	Applicability of FASB Statement No. 2 to Computer Software—an interpretation of FASB Statement No. 2	Feb. 1975	Amended; Parts deleted
7.	Applying FASB Statement No. 7 in Financial Statements of Established Operating Enterprises—an interpretation of FASB Statement No. 7	Oct. 1975	None
8.	Classification of a Short-Term Obligation Repaid Prior to Being Replaced by a Long-Term Security—an interpretation of FASB Statement No. 6	Jan. 1976	None
9.	Applying APB Opinions No. 16 and 17 When a Savings and Loan Association or a Similar Institution is Acquired in a Business Combination Accounted for by the Purchase Method—an interpretation of APB Opinions No. 16 and 17	Feb. 1976	Amended; Partially superseded
10.	Application of FASB Statement No. 12 to Personal Financial Statements—an interpretation of FASB Statement No. 12	Sept. 1976	Superseded by FASB Statement 83, para. 7
11.	Changes in Market Value after the Balance Sheet Date—an interpretation of FASB Statement No. 12	Sept. 1976	Superseded by FASB Statement 115, para. 124
12.	Accounting for Previously Established Allowance Accounts—an interpretation of FASB Statement No. 12	Sept. 1976	Superseded by FASB Statement 115, para. 124
13.	Consolidation of a Parent and Its Subsidiaries Having Different Balance Sheet Dates—an interpretation of FASB Statement No. 12	Sept. 1976	Superseded by FASB Statement 115, para. 124
14.	Using Reasonable Estimation of the Amount of a Loss—an interpretation of FASB Statement No. 5	Sept. 1976	None
15.	Translation of Unamortized Policy Acquisition Costs by a Stock Life Insurance Company—an interpretation of FASB Statement No. 8	Sept. 1976	Amended; Superseded by FASB Statement 52, para. 3
16.	Clarification of Definitions and Accounting for Marketable Equity Securities That Become Nonmarketable—an interpretation of FASB Statement No. 12	Feb. 1977	Superseded by FASB Statement 115, para. 124
17.	Applying the Lower of Cost or Market Rule in Translated Financial Statements—an interpretation of FASB Statement No. 8	Feb. 1977	Superseded by FASB Statement 52, para. 3
18.	Accounting for Income Taxes in Interim Periods—an interpretation of APB Opinion No. 28	Mar. 1977	Heavily amended; Parts deleted or replaced
19.	Lessee Guarantee of the Residual Value of Leased Property—an interpretation of FASB Statement No. 13	Oct. 1977	None
20.	Reporting Accounting Changes under AICPA Statements of Position—an interpretation of APB Opinion No. 20	Nov. 1977	Amended
21.	Accounting for Leases in a Business Combination—an interpretation of FASB Statement No. 13	Apr. 1978	Amended; Parts deleted
22.	Using Applicability of Indefinite Reversal Criteria to Timing Differences—an interpretation of APB Opinions No. 11 and 23	Apr. 1978	Amended; Parts deleted; Superseded by FASB Statement 96, para. 203(k), and FASB Statement 109, para. 286(n)
23.	Leases of Certain Property Owned by a Governmental Unit or Authority—an interpretation of FASB Statement No. 13	Aug. 1978	None
24.	Using Leases Involving Only Part of a Building—an interpretation of FASB Statement No. 13	Sept. 1978	None
25.	Accounting for an Unused Investment Tax Credit—an interpretation of APB Opinions No. 2, 4, 11, and 16	Sept. 1978	Parts deleted; Superseded by FASB Statement 96, para. 203(l), and FASB Statement 109, para. 286(o)
26.	Accounting for Purchase of a Leased Asset by the Lessee during the Term of the Lease—an interpretation of FASB Statement No. 13	Sept. 1978	None
27.	Accounting for a Loss on a Sublease—an interpretation of FASB Statement No. 13 and APB Opinion No. 30	Nov. 1978	Parts deleted
28.	Accounting for Stock Appreciation Rights and Other Variable Stock Option or Award Plans—an interpretation of APB Opinions No. 15 and 25	Dec. 1978	Amended; Parts replaced
29.	Reporting Tax Benefits Realized on Disposition of Investments in Certain Subsidiaries and Other Investees—an interpretation of APB Opinions No. 23 and 24	Feb. 1979	Superseded by FASB Statement 96, para. 203(m), and FASB Statement 109, para. 286(p)
30.	Accounting for Involuntary Conversions of Nonmonetary Assets to Monetary Assets—an interpretation of APB Opinion No. 29	Sept. 1979	Amended
31.	Treatment of Stock Compensation Plans in EPS Computations—an interpretation of APB Opinion No. 15 and a modification of FASB Interpretation No. 28	Feb. 1980	Amended; Superseded by FASB Statement 128, para. 160(e)
32.	Application of Percentage Limitations in Recognizing Investment Tax Credit—an interpretation of APB Opinions 2, 4, and 11	Mar. 1980	Superseded by FASB Statement 96, para. 203(n), and FASB Statement 109, para. 286(q)
33.	Applying FASB Statement No. 34 to Oil and Gas Producing Operations Accounted for by the Full Cost Method—an interpretation of FASB Statement No. 34	Aug. 1980	None
34.	Disclosure of Indirect Guarantees of Indebtedness of Others—an interpretation of FASB Statement No. 5	Mar. 1981	Superseded by FASB Interpretation 45, para. 19
35.	Criteria for Applying the Equity Method of Accounting for Investments in Common Stock—an interpretation of APB Opinion No. 18	May 1981	None
36.	Accounting for Exploratory Wells in Progress at the End of a Period—an interpretation of FASB Statement No. 19	Oct. 1981	None
37.	Accounting for Translation Adjustments upon Sale of Part of an Investment in a Foreign Entity—an interpretation of FASB Statement No. 52	July 1983	None
38.	Determining the Measurement Date for Stock Option, Purchase, and Award Plans Involving Junior Stock—an interpretation of APB Opinion No. 25	Aug. 1984	Amended; Parts replaced
39.	Offsetting of Amounts Related to Certain Contracts—an interpretation of APB Opinion No. 10 and FASB Statement No. 105	Mar. 1992	Amended
40.	Applicability of Generally Accepted Accounting Principles to Mutual Life Insurance and Other Enterprises—an interpretation of FASB Statements No. 12, 60, 97, and 113	Apr. 1993	Amended
41.	Offsetting of Amounts Related to Certain Repurchase and Reverse Repurchase Agreements—an interpretation of APB Opinion No. 10 and a modification of FASB Interpretation No. 39	Dec. 1994	None
42.	Accounting for Transfers of Assets in Which a Not-for-Profit Organization Is Granted Variance Power—an interpretation of FASB Statement No. 116	Sept. 1996	Superseded by FASB Statement 136, para. 7
43.	Real Estate Sales—an interpretation of FASB Statement No. 66	June 1999	Amended
44.	Accounting for Certain Transactions involving Stock Compensation—an interpretation of APB Opinion No. 25	Mar. 2000	Amended; Parts deleted
45.	Guarantor's Accounting and Disclosure Requirements for Guarantees, Including Indirect Guarantees of Indebtedness of Others—an interpretation of FASB Statements No. 5, 57, and 107 and rescission of FASB Interpretation No. 34	Nov. 2002	None
46.	Consolidation of Variable Interest Entities—an interpretation of ARB No. 51	Jan. 2003	Superseded by FASB Interpretation 46(R), para. 4
46(R)	Consolidation of Variable Interest Entities (revised December 2003)—an interpretation of ARB No. 51	Dec. 2003	Amended
47.	Accounting for Conditional Asset Retirement Obligations—an interpretation of FASB Statement No. 143	Mar. 2005	None
48.	Accounting for Uncertainty in Income Taxes—an interpretation of FASB Statement No. 109	Jun. 2006	Amended; Parts deleted
