= ClimateWorks Foundation =

Nonprofit organization in San Francisco

- Founded: 2008
- Founder: Hewlett Foundation; McKnight Foundation; Packard Foundation
- Type: Non-profit foundation (non-profit)
- Legal status: 501(c)(3) organization
- Headquarters: San Francisco, California, U.S.
- President and CEO: Helen Mountford
- Website: climateworks.org

ClimateWorks Foundation ("ClimateWorks") is a nonprofit organization headquartered in San Francisco that focuses on climate change. The organization was founded by the Hewlett Foundation, McKnight Foundation, and Packard Foundation in 2008.

ClimateWorks provides funding and support to U.S. and international organizations and initiatives that aim to accelerate climate efforts. As of 2026, the foundation had granted nearly $2 billion to organizations and initiatives.

== History ==
=== Founding and early years ===
ClimateWorks Foundation was founded in 2008 by the Hewlett Foundation, McKnight Foundation, and Packard Foundation. The three organizations collectively pledged $1 billion over the following five years to combat climate change, focusing on reducing carbon emissions. These founders had financed a report called "Design to Win" that laid out an approach for reducing 30 gigatons of annual heat emissions by the year 2030. The foundation, led by CEO Hal Harvey at the time, based its initial strategy on this 2007 report.

In 2010, the foundation created the Climate and Land Use Alliance, a funding group that supports efforts related to forest conservation and land use.

In 2012, Charlotte Pera became the foundation's president and CEO. The organization shifted its approach to supporting multinational initiatives and created programs in areas such as carbon dioxide removal, cooling, and road transportation. The organization also provided resources for donors such as funder learning communities. In 2016 the nonprofit was listed in Forbes Magazine as one of the 100 largest U.S. charities.

=== Since 2020 ===
Around 2020, the foundation began to focus more on people and the impact of climate change. It continued to provide funds to grantees and support for funders.

In the early 2020s, the organization was criticized for its "technocratic" and "rigid" approach that focused on major advocacy work rather than supporting grassroots organizations and smaller-scale initiatives that can benefit communities. Critics argued that the organization often gave to the same large organizations and didn't provide enough support to smaller community-based organizations. According to The Chronicle of Philanthropy, ClimateWorks had begun to change its approach and incorporate more support for grassroots organizations and efforts as of 2022. Also in 2022, Inside Philanthropy noted that the foundation had increased decentralized grantmaking for community impact in response to critiques.

During this period the foundation established the Kigali Cooling Efficiency Program, later known as the Clean Cooling Collaborative. The joint-action fund aims to reduce the use of refrigerants and supports changes to help people access cooling. In 2021, the foundation launched the Drive Electric Campaign, an initiative aimed at broader adoption of electric vehicles.

The organization appointed Chris DeCardy as interim CEO in 2021, who was then succeeded by Helen Mountford as CEO in January 2022.

In late 2023 and early 2024, the foundation was part of two groups of funders that signed calls to action to commit more funding for climate change adaptation.

== Organization ==
ClimateWorks is a non-profit foundation which provides global climate change grants. As of 2020, work supported by the foundation's grants was split as approximately 56% global, 12% within the United States, and 32% in other countries.

The organization is led by Helen Mountford, who became the foundation's president and chief executive officer in 2022. Past leadership has included Hal Harvey, Charlotte Pera, and Chris DeCardy.

== Donors and grantees ==
The foundation's donors have included the Hewlett Foundation, the Packard Foundation, and the McKnight Foundation, which were its initial funders and the largest donors as of 2009, the year following ClimateWorks' founding. Other donors have included Bloomberg Philanthropies, the Bezos Earth Fund, the Ford Foundation, the Oak Foundation and the MacArthur Foundation.

The organization's grantees include regional non-profits such as the African Climate Foundation, the European Climate Foundation, Instituto Clima e Sociedade in Brazil and ViriyaENB in Indonesia.
