= Ankit Aggarwal =

Indian cricketer (born 1983)

Personal information
- Born: 5 May 1983 (age 43); Kangra, Himachal Pradesh, India

Ankit Aggarwal (born 5 June 1983) is an Indian cricketer. And BCCI level – B coach. He is Zca u-16 fielding coach and HPCA U-19 Head Coach.

He was a middle-handed batsman and leg-break bowler who played for Himachal Pradesh. He was born in Kangra.

Aggarwal made a single first-class appearance for the side, during the 2004–05 season, against Jharkhand. From the tailend, he scored 11 runs in the first innings in which he batted, and a duck in the second.

Aggarwal bowled 5 overs during the match, conceding 30 runs.
