= University of Akron College of Business =

Business school of the University of Akron

The University of Akron College of Business
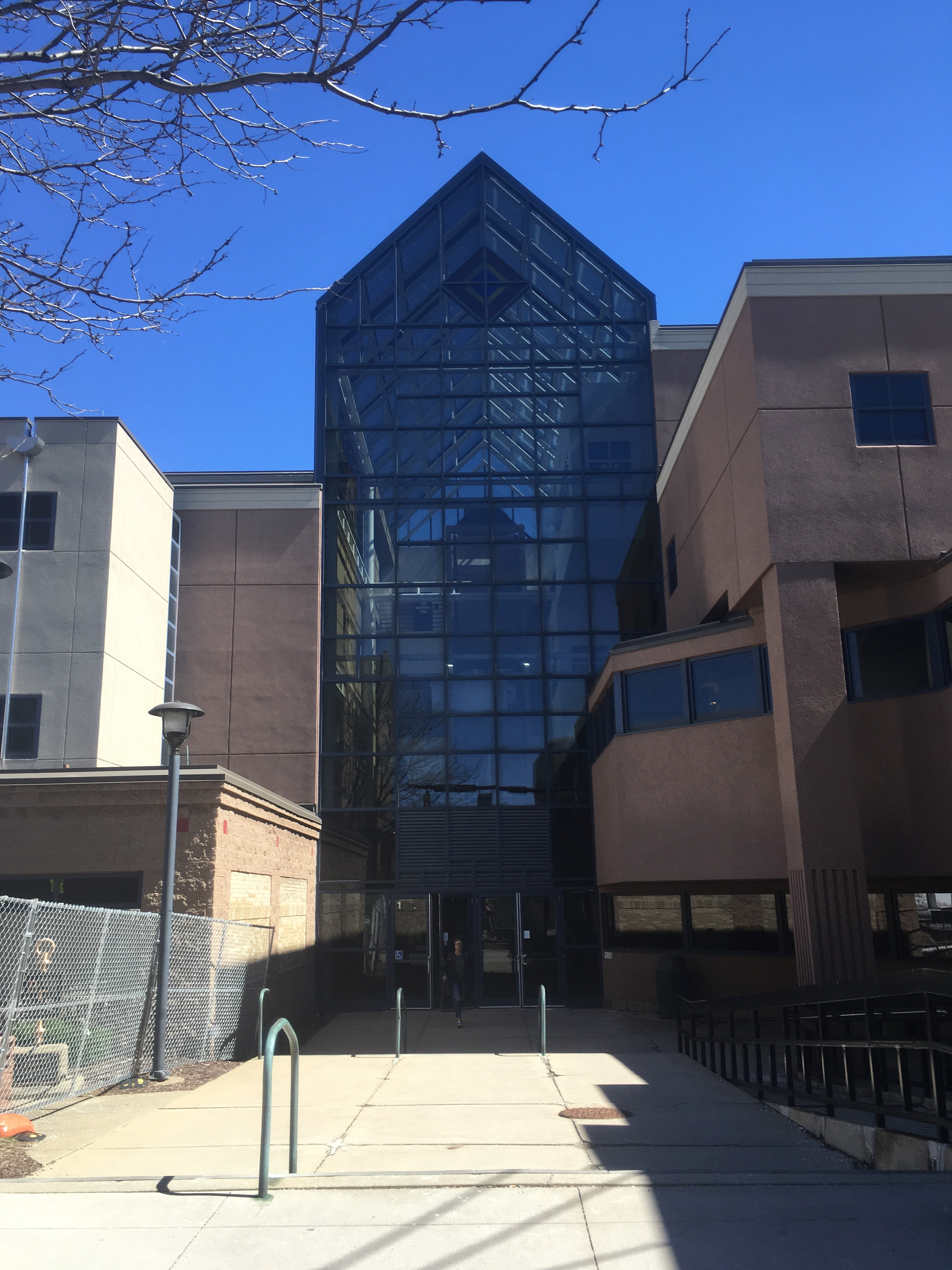
- College of Business Building
- Type: Public
- Established: 1953
- Dean: Terry Daugherty
- Faculty: 102
- Undergraduates: 2,600
- Postgraduates: 450
- Location: Akron, Ohio, U.S. 41.0775°N 81.5178°W
- Website: www.uakron.edu/cba/

The University of Akron College of Business is a dual accredited AACSB business school of the University of Akron in Akron, Ohio. The college has a total enrollment of nearly 1,700 undergraduate students and 217 graduate students. All of the college's programs are accredited by AACSB International – the Association to Advance Collegiate Schools of Business. The college currently uses two buildings, the first which was opened in 1991, is a four-story, 81,000-square-foot (7,500 m^{2}) structure with 19 classrooms. In 2020, it was expanded with an newly built professional development building, increasing both the number of classrooms and office facilities. In addition, the college's marketing department is housed in the Polsky building, where it occupies the fifth floor.

There are several institutes and research centers in the college, including the Fisher Institute for Professional Selling, the Fitzgerald Institute for Entrepreneurial Studies, the Institute for Global Business, the Taylor Institute for Direct Marketing, the Center for Information Technology and e-Business, the Center for Organizational Development, the Center for Research and Training in Information Security and Assurance and the Suarez Applied Marketing Research Laboratories.

== History ==
The undergraduate division of the College of Business was founded in 1953, originally with 14 full-time and 19 part-time faculty to instruct 107 students. In 1966, the college received full accreditation by AACSB International.

Its graduate program was introduced in 1958, and it received AACSB International accreditation in 1976.

== Undergraduate programs ==
For undergraduates, the College of Business offers two degree programs – the Bachelor of Science in accounting (BSA) and the Bachelor of Business Administration (BBA). Students pursuing the BBA may select from among eleven different majors. The college also offers a variety of undergraduate minors and certificates. Undergraduate enrollment in the college is nearly 1,700.

== Graduate programs ==
The graduate program admits students seeking the Master of Business Administration, Master of Science in Management, Master of Science in Accountancy, and Master of Taxation degrees. The enrollment is 450 students. The Fall 2011 entering class had a mean GMAT score of 592, and an average undergraduate GPA of 3.4. The average entering student is 29 years old with 4 years of work experience.

In the MBA program, students can specialize in direct integrated marketing, e-business, entrepreneurship, finance, health-care management, international business, international finance, management, management of technology and innovation, strategic marketing, and supply-chain management.

The Master of Science in Management program offers a concentration in information systems management.

== Rankings ==
In 2011, the college was ranked by Bloomberg BusinessWeek, for the third year in a row as one of the best undergraduate schools in the nation. In 2010, the college made a big leap from 93rd to 76th. In addition, the college was ranked #7 in the U.S. in recruiter satisfaction.

BusinessWeek also ranked the college first in Ohio, and 39th nationally among public schools, for giving its students the biggest return on their tuition dollars after graduation.

The college has been recently featured in The Princeton Review's "The Best 294 Business Schools: 2012 edition". This is the eighth consecutive year it has attained this recognition.

The college's George W. Daverio School of Accountancy was nationally ranked by the Public Accounting Report (PAR) in its 30th Annual Survey of Accounting Professors (Vol. 35, Nov. 2010) in which over 1,700 accounting educators participated. The Accounting Program was ranked No. 22 for undergraduate accounting education.

In a 2010 study conducted by the Center for Sales Leadership at DePaul University, the sales management program was ranked #3 out of 68 sales and sales management programs in the U.S. and Canada.

In Best Colleges 2011, U.S. News ranked the college as one of the best undergraduate business programs in the nation. This ranking is based solely on peer assessment. U.S. News surveys deans and senior faculty at each undergraduate business program accredited by AACSB International and asks them to rate the quality of all programs with which they were familiar.

== See also ==
- List of business schools in the United States
