= ARPA-E =

Agency of the U.S. Energy Department

Advanced Research Projects Agency–Energy
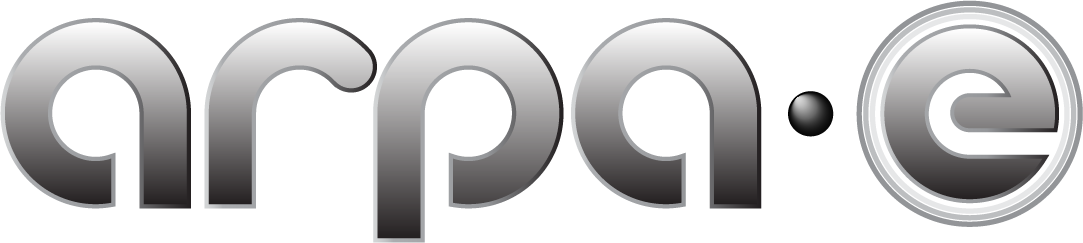
- Abbreviation: ARPA-E
- Formation: 2009; 17 years ago
- Type: Governmental organization
- Director: Conner Prochaska
- Parent organization: US Department of Energy
- Website: arpa-e.energy.gov

ARPA-E, or Advanced Research Projects Agency–Energy is an agency within the United States Department of Energy tasked with funding the research and development of advanced energy technologies. The goal of the agency is to improve U.S. economic prosperity, national security, and environmental well being. ARPA-E typically funds short-term research projects with the potential for a transformative impact. It is inspired by the Defense Advanced Research Projects Agency (DARPA).

The program directors at ARPA-E serve limited terms, in an effort to reduce bureaucracy and bias. Since September 2025, the director is Conner Prochaska.

== History and mission ==
=== Legislative history ===
ARPA-E was initially conceived by a report by the National Academies entitled Rising Above the Gathering Storm: Energizing and Employing America for a Brighter Economic Future. The report described a need for the US to stimulate innovation and develop clean, affordable, and reliable energy. ARPA-E was officially created by the America COMPETES Act, authored by Congressman Bart Gordon, within the United States Department of Energy (DOE) in 2007, though without a budget. The initial budget of about $400 million was a part of the economic stimulus bill of February 2009. In early January 2011, the America COMPETES Reauthorization Act of 2010 made additional changes to ARPA-E's structure; this structure is codified in Title 42, Chapter 149, Subchapter XVII, § 16538 of the United States Code.

Among its main provisions, Section 16538 provides that ARPA-E shall achieve its goals through energy technology projects by doing the following:

1. Identifying and promoting revolutionary advances in fundamental and applied sciences;
2. Translating scientific discoveries and cutting-edge inventions into technological innovations; and
3. Accelerating transformational technological advances in areas that industry by itself is not likely to undertake because of technical and financial uncertainty.

=== Mission ===
Like DARPA does for military technology, ARPA-E is intended to fund high-risk, high-reward research involving government labs, private industry, and universities that might not otherwise be pursued. ARPA-E has four objectives:

1. To bring a freshness, excitement, and sense of mission to energy research that will attract the U.S.'s best and brightest minds;
2. To focus on creative, transformation energy research that the industry cannot, or will not support due to its high risk, but that has high reward potential;
3. To utilize an ARPA-like organization that is flat, nimble, and sparse, capable of sustaining for long periods of time those projects whose promise remains real, while phasing out programs that do not prove to be as promising as anticipated; and
4. To create a new tool to bridge the gap between basic energy research and development/industrial innovation.

=== Launch ===
ARPA-E was created as part of the America COMPETES act signed by President George W. Bush in August 2007. President Barack Obama announced the launch of ARPA-E on April 27, 2009 as part of an announcement about federal investment in research and development and science education. Soon after its launch, ARPA-E released its first Funding Opportunity Announcement, offering $151 million in total with individual awards ranging from $500,000 to $9 million. Applicants submitted eight-page "concept papers" that outlined the technical concept; some were invited to submit full applications.

Arun Majumdar, former deputy director of the Lawrence Berkeley National Laboratory, was appointed the first director of ARPA-E in September 2009, over six months after the organization was first funded. U.S. Secretary of Energy Steven Chu presided over the inaugural ARPA-E Energy Innovation Summit on March 1–3, 2010 in Washington, D.C.

== Timeline ==
2006

The National Academies released “Rising Above the Gathering Storm” report.

August 9, 2007

President George W. Bush signed into law the America COMPETES Act that codified many of the recommendations in the National Academies report, thus creating ARPA-E.

April 27, 2009

President Barack Obama allocated $400 million in funding to ARPA-E from the American Recovery and Reinvestment Act of 2009.

September 18, 2009

President Barack Obama nominated Arun Majumdar as Director of ARPA-E.

October 22, 2009

Senate confirmed Arun Majumdar as ARPA-E's first Director.

October 26, 2009

Department of Energy awarded $151 million in Recovery Act funds for 37 energy research projects under ARPA-E's first Funding Opportunity Announcement.

December 7, 2009

U.S. Secretary of Energy Steven Chu announced ARPA-E's second round of funding opportunities in the areas of “Electrofuels”, “Innovative Materials & Processes for Advanced Carbon Capture Technologies (IMPACCT),” and “Batteries for Electrical Energy Storage in Transportation (BEEST).”

March 1 – 3, 2010

ARPA-E hosted the inaugural “Energy Innovation Summit” which attracted over 1,700 participants.

March 2, 2010

U.S. Secretary of Energy Steven Chu announced ARPA-E's third round of funding opportunity in the areas of “Grid-Scale Rampable Intermittent Dispatchable Storage (GRIDS),” “Agile Delivery of Electrical Power Technology (ADEPT),” and “Building Energy Efficiency Through Innovative Thermodevices (BEET-IT).”

April 29, 2010

Vice President Joe Biden announced 37 awarded projects under ARPA-E's second funding opportunity.

July 12, 2010

Department of Energy awarded $92 Million for 42 research projects under ARPA-E's third funding opportunity.

December 8, 2014

Ellen Williams confirmed by the Senate as Director of ARPA-E.

June 28, 2019

Lane Genatowski confirmed by the Senate as Director of ARPA-E.

December 22, 2022

Evelyn Wang was confirmed by the Senate as director of ARPA-E.

September 18, 2025

Conner Prochaska was confirmed by the Senate as director of ARPA-E

== ARPA-E and EERE ==
ARPA-E was created to fund energy technology projects that translate scientific discoveries and inventions into technological innovations, and accelerate technological advances in high-risk areas that industry is not likely to pursue independently. This goal is similar to the work of the U.S. Department of Energy's Office of Energy Efficiency and Renewable Energy (EERE) which advances clean energy projects according to established roadmaps. However, ARPA-E also funds advanced technology in other spaces such as natural gas and grid technology. ARPA-E does not fund incremental improvements to existing technologies or roadmaps established by existing DOE programs.

== Project creation and the review process ==
ARPA-E programs are created through a process of debate surrounding the technical/scientific merits and challenges of potential research areas. Programs must satisfy both “technology push”—the technical merit of innovative platform technologies that can be applied to energy systems—and “market pull”—the potential market impact and cost-effectiveness of the technology.

=== Project creation ===
The program creation process begins with a “deep dive” where an energy problem is explored to identify potential topics for program development. ARPA-E Program Directors then hold technical workshops to gather input from experts in various disciplines about current and upcoming technologies. To date, ARPA-E has hosted or co-hosted 13 technical workshops.

Following each workshop, the Program Director proposes a new program and defends the program against a set of criteria that justifies its creation. The Program Director then refines the program, incorporating feedback, and seeks approval from the Director. If successful, a new ARPA-E program is created, and a funding opportunity announcement (FOA) is released soliciting project proposals.

=== Peer review process ===
The ARPA-E peer review process is designed to help drive program success. During proposal review, ARPA-E solicits external feedback from leading experts in a particular field. ARPA-E reviewers evaluate applications over several weeks and then convene a review panel.

One notable facet of ARPA-E's evaluation process is the opportunity for the applicant to read reviewers’ comments and provide a rebuttal that the Agency reviews before making funding decisions. The applicant response period allows ARPA-E to avoid misunderstandings by asking clarifying questions that enable ARPA-E to make informed decisions.

== Funding and awards ==
=== First funding opportunity ===
The U.S. Department of Energy and ARPA-E awarded $151 million in American Recovery and Reinvestment Act funds on October 26, 2009 for 37 energy research projects. It supported renewable energy technologies for solar cells, wind turbines, geothermal drilling, biofuels, and biomass energy crops. The grants also supported energy efficiency technologies, including power electronics and engine-generators for advanced vehicles, devices for waste heat recovery, smart glass and control systems for smart buildings, light-emitting diodes (LEDs), reverse-osmosis membranes for water desalination, catalysts to split water into hydrogen and oxygen, improved fuel cell membranes, and more energy-dense magnetic materials for electronic components. Six grants went to energy storage technologies, including an ultracapacitor, improved lithium-ion batteries, metal-air batteries that use ionic liquids, liquid sodium batteries, and liquid metal batteries. Other awards went to projects that conducted research and development on a bioreactor with potential to produce gasoline directly from sunlight and carbon dioxide, and crystal growth technology to lower the cost of light emitting diodes.

=== Second funding opportunity ===
The U.S. Secretary of Energy Steven Chu announced a second round of ARPA-E funding opportunities on December 7, 2009. ARPA-E solicited projects that focused on three critical areas: Biofuels from Electricity (Electrofuels), Batteries for Electrical Energy Storage in Transportation (BEEST), and Innovative Materials and Processes for Advanced Carbon Capture Technologies (IMPACCT). On April 29, 2010, Vice President Biden announced the 37 awardees that ARPA-E had selected from over 540 initial concept papers. The awards ranged from around $500,000 to $6 million and involved a variety of national laboratories, universities, and companies.

Unlike the First Funding Opportunity, the Second Funding Opportunity designated project submissions by category. Of the selected projects, 14 focused on IMPAACT, 13 focused on Electrofuels, and 10 focused on BEEST. For example, Harvard Medical School submitted a project under Electrofuels entitled "Engineering a Bacterial Reverse Fuel Cell," which focuses on development of a bacterium that can convert carbon dioxide into gasoline. MIT received an award under BEEST for a proposal entitled "Semi-Solid Rechargeable Fuel Battery," a concept for producing lighter, smaller, and cheaper vehicle batteries. IMPAACT projects included the GE Global Research Center's "CO2 Capture Process Using Phase-Changing Absorbents," which focuses on a liquid that turns solid when exposed to carbon dioxide.

=== Third funding opportunity ===
On March 2, 2010, at the inaugural ARPA-E Energy Innovation Summit, U.S. Energy Secretary Steven Chu announced a third funding opportunity for ARPA-E projects. Like the second funding opportunity, ARPA-E solicited projects by category: Grid-Scale Rampable Intermittent Dispatchable Storage (GRIDS), Agile Delivery of Electrical Power Technology (ADEPT), and Building Energy Efficiency Through Innovative Thermodevices (BEET-IT). GRIDS welcomed projects that focused on widespread deployment of cost-effective grid-scale energy storage in two specific areas: 1) proof of concept storage component projects focused on validating new, over-the-horizon electrical energy storage concepts, and 2) advanced system prototypes that address critical shortcomings of existing grid-scale energy storage technologies. ADEPT focused on investing in materials for fundamental advances in soft magnetics, high voltage switches, and reliable, high-density charge storage in three categories: 1) fully integrated, chip-scale power converters for applications including, but not limited to, compact, efficient drivers for solid-state lighting, distributed micro-inverters for photovoltaics, and single-chip power supplies for computers, 2) kilowatt scale package integrated power converters by enabling applications such as low-cost, efficient inverters for grid-tied photovoltaics and variable speed motors, and 3) lightweight, solid-state, medium voltage energy conversion for high power applications such as solid-state electrical substations and wind turbine generators. BEET-IT solicited projects regarding energy efficient cooling technologies and air conditioners (AC) for buildings to save energy and reduce GHG emissions in the following areas: 1) cooling systems that use refrigerants with low global warming potential; 2) energy efficient air conditioning (AC) systems for warm and humid climates with an increased coefficient of performance (COP); and 3) vapor compression AC systems for hot climates for re-circulating air loads with an increased COP.

Secretary Chu announced the selection of 43 projects under GRIDS, ADEPT, and BEET-IT on July 12, 2010. The awards totaled $92 million and ranged from $400,000 to $5 million. The awards included 14 projects in ADEPT, 17 projects in BEET-IT, and 12 projects in GRIDS. Examples of awarded projects include a "Soluble Acid Lead Flow Battery" that pumps chemicals through a battery cell when electricity is needed (GRIDS), "Silicon Carbide Power Modules for Grid Scale Power Conversion" that uses advanced transistors to make the electrical grid more flexible and controllable (ADEPT), and an "Absorption-Osmosis Cooling Cycle," a new air conditioning system that uses water as a refrigerant, rather than chemicals (BEET-IT).

=== Fourth funding opportunity ===
ARPA-E's fourth round of funding was announced on April 20, 2011 and awarded projects in five technology areas: Plants Engineered To Replace Oil (PETRO), High Energy Advanced Thermal Storage (HEATS), Rare Earth Alternatives in Critical Technologies (REACT), Green Electricity Network Integration (GENI), and Solar Agile Delivery of Electrical Power Technology (Solar ADEPT). PETRO focused on projects that had systems to create biofuels from domestic sources such as tobacco and pine trees for half their current cost. REACT funded early-stage technology alternatives that reduced or eliminated the dependence on rare earth materials by developing substitutes in two key areas: electric vehicle motors and wind generators. HEATS funded projects that promoted advancement in thermal energy storage technology. GENI focused on funding software and hardware that could reliably control the grid network. Solar ADEPT accepted projects that integrated power electronics into solar panels and solar farms to extract and deliver energy more efficiently.

The Awardees for the fourth funding opportunity were announced on September 29, 2011. The 60 projects received $156 million from the ARPA-E Fiscal Year 2011 budget. Examples of the awarded projects included a project that increases the production of turpentine, a natural liquid biofuel (PETRO); a project entitled "Manganese-Based Permanent Magnet," that reduces the cost of wind turbines and electric vehicles by developing a replacement for rare earth magnets based on an innovative composite using manganese materia (REACT); a project entitled "HybriSol," that develops a heat battery to store energy from the sun (HEATS); a project that develops a new system that allows real-time, automated control over the transmission lines that make up the electric power grid (GENI); and a project that develops light-weight electronics to connect to photovoltaic solar panels to be installed on walls or rooftops.

== ARPA-E Energy Innovation Summit ==
Since 2010, ARPA-E has hosted the Energy Innovation Summit. The 10th Summit was held July 8–10, 2019 in Denver, Colorado, and the 11th Summit was held March 17–19, 2021 at the Gaylord Convention Center, near Washington, D.C. At the 2026 Summit, ARPA-E announced major investments in fusion technology.

== ARPA-E accomplishments ==
ARPA-E has generated over 1,000 projects since inception, attracted about $4.9 billion in private investment for 179 of these projects, with $2.6 billion invested in R&D by the US government. Published, peer reviewed research articles are also a significant output, totaling 4,614. In addition, as of May 2026, the program has generated more than 1,400 patents.

== See also ==
- America COMPETES Act
- International Renewable Energy Agency (IRENA)
- Advanced Research Projects Agency for Health (ARPA-H)
- Advanced Research Projects Agency–Infrastructure (ARPA-I)
- Defense Advanced Research Projects Agency (DARPA)
- Homeland Security Advanced Research Projects Agency (HSARPA)
- Intelligence Advanced Research Projects Activity (IARPA)
