= List of Stanford University faculty and staff =

This page lists faculty and staff members of Stanford University.

== Stanford office ==
=== Presidents ===
Acting presidents were temporary appointments. Swain served while Wilbur was United States Secretary of the Interior under Herbert Hoover; Eurich and Faust after the unexpected death of Tresidder.

The following persons served as president of Stanford University:

No.	Portrait	Name	Term start	Term end	Refs.
1		David Starr Jordan	1891	1913	
2		John Casper Branner	1913	December 31, 1915	
3		Ray Lyman Wilbur (Note: Wilbur took a 4 year leave to serve as U.S. Secretary of the Interior in the Hoover administration.)	January 22, 1916	June 30, 1943	
*		Robert Eccles Swain (Note: Swain served as acting president during the time when President Wilbur served as U.S. Secretary of the Interior in the Hoover administration.)	March 5, 1929	March 4, 1933	
4		Donald Bertrand Tresidder	October 14, 1943	January 28, 1948 (Note: Tresidder died in office.)	
*		Alvin C. Eurich	January 28, 1948	December 31, 1948	
*		Clarence H. Faust	January 1, 1949	March 31, 1949	
5		J. E. Wallace Sterling	April 1, 1949	August 31, 1968	
*		Robert J. Glaser	September 1, 1968	November 30, 1968	
6		Kenneth Pitzer	December 1, 1968	June 25, 1970	
7		Richard Wall Lyman	September 24, 1970	July 31, 1980	
8		Donald Kennedy	August 1, 1980	August 31, 1992	
9		Gerhard Casper	September 1, 1992	August 31, 2000	
10		John L. Hennessy	September 1, 2000	August 31, 2016	
*		John Etchemendy (Note: Provost Etchemendy served as acting president for five months in 2012 while President Hennessy was on sabbatical.)	February 14, 2012	June 8, 2012	
11		Marc Tessier-Lavigne	September 1, 2016	August 31, 2023	
12*		Richard Saller	September 1, 2023	July 31, 2024	
13		Jonathan Levin	August 1, 2024	present	

Table notes:

Color key

Acting University president (*)

=== Provosts ===
The position was created in 1952.

No.	Portrait	Name	Term	Ref.
1		Douglas M. Whitaker	1952–1955	
2		Frederick Terman	1955–1965	
3		Richard Wall Lyman	1967–1970	
4		William F. Miller	1971–1978	
5		Gerald J. Lieberman	1979	
6		Donald Kennedy	1979–1980	
7		Albert M. Hastorf	1980–1984	
8		James N. Rosse	1984–1992	
9		Gerald J. Lieberman	1992–1993	
10		Condoleezza Rice	1993–1999	
11		John L. Hennessy	1999–2000	
12		John Etchemendy	2000–2017	
13		Persis Drell	2017–2023	
14		Jenny Martínez	2023–present	

=== Chancellors ===
This position is often empty and has always been held by a former president.

No.	Name	Term	Ref.
1		David Starr Jordan	1913–1916
2		Ray Lyman Wilbur	1943–1949
3		J. E. Wallace Sterling	1968–1985

=== School deans ===
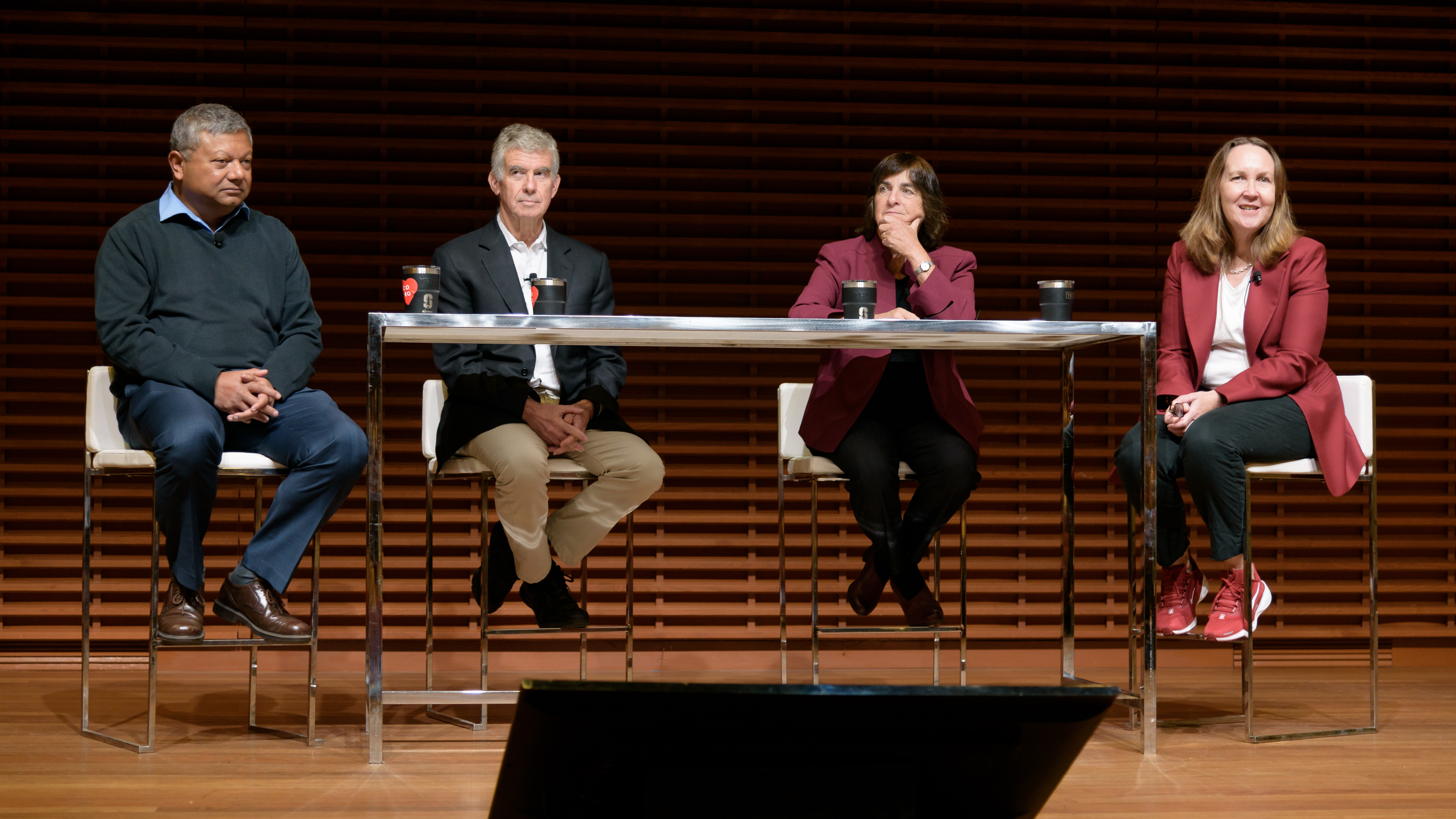
Provost Jenny Martinez (far right) leads a panel of deans (left to right): Arun Majumdar, Daniel L. Schwartz, and Jennifer Widom.

Though Stanford did not originally have schools, over the years the departments have all been collected into schools.

Color key

Acting dean (*)

Graduate School of Business
	Name	Years	Notes
1	Willard E. Hotchkiss	1926–1930	
2	J. Hugh Jackson	1931–1956	
	Carlton A. Pederson	1956–1958	acting dean
3	Ernest C. Arbuckle	1958–1968	
	Samuel "Pete" Pond	1968–1969	acting dean
4	Arjay Miller	1969–1979	The top 10% of graduating MBAs are named Arjay Miller Scholars.
	Robert Jaedicke	1979–1980	acting dean
5	Rene C. McPherson	1980–1982	
6	Robert Jaedicke	1983–1990	
7	Michael Spence	1990–1999	
8	Robert L. Joss	1999–2009	Stanford Ph.D. 1970
9	Garth Saloner	2009–2015	
10	Jonathan Levin	2016–2024	13th president of the university Stanford AB, BS 1994
11	Sarah Soule	2025–present	

Doerr School of Sustainability
	Name	Years	Notes
1	Arun Majumdar	2022–present	

School of Earth, Energy & Environmental Sciences
	Name	Years	Notes
1	A. I. Levorsen	1947–1950	Petroleum geologist
2	Charles Park	1950–1965	
3	Richard Jahns	1965–1979	
4	Allan V. Cox	1979–1987	
5	George A. Thompson	1987–1989	
6	W. G. Ernst	1989–1994	
7	Lynn Orr	1994–2002	
8	Pamela Matson	2002–2017	
9	Stephan Graham	2017–2022	

Graduate School of Education
	Name	Years	Note
1	Ellwood Patterson Cubberley	1917–1933	
2	Grayson N. Kefauver	1933–1946	
*	Lucien Blair Kinney	1943–1946	acting
3	A. John Bartky	1946–1953	
4	I. James Quillen	1954–1966	
5	H. Thomas James	1966–1970	
6	Arthur Coladarci	1970–1979	
7	Myron Atkin	1979–1986	
8	Marshall S. Smith	1986–1993	
9	Richard Shavelson	1993–2001	
10	Deborah Stipek	2000–2011	
11	Claude Steele	2011–2014	
*	Deborah Stipek	2014–2015	acting
12	Daniel L. Schwartz	2015–present	

School of Engineering
	Name	Years	Department	Notes
1	Theodore J. Hoover	1925–1936	Mining and Metallurgy	Stanford AB 1901
2	Samuel B. Morris	1936–1944	Civil Engineering	Stanford AB 1911
3	Frederick E. Terman	1944–1958	Electrical Engineering	
4	Joseph M. Pettit	1958–1972	Electrical Engineering	Stanford Ph.D. 1942
5	William M. Kays	1972–1984	Mechanical Engineering	Stanford Ph.D. 1951
6	James F. Gibbons	1984–1996	Electrical Engineering	Stanford Ph.D. 1956
7	John L. Hennessy	1996–1999	Computer Science	11th president of the university
8	James Plummer	1999–2014	Electrical Engineering	
9	Persis Drell	2014–2016	SLAC/Physics	
10	Jennifer Widom	2017–present	Computer Science and Electrical Engineering	

School of Humanities and Sciences
	Name	Years	Department	Notes
1	Clarence H. Faust	1948–1951	English	
2	Douglas Merritt Whitaker	1951–1952	Biology	
3	Ray N. Faulkner	1952–1956	Art and Architecture	
4	Philip H. Rhinelander	1956–1961	Philosophy	
5	Robert Richardson Sears	1961–1970	Psychology	
6	Albert H. Hastorf III	1970–1973	Psychology	
7	Halsey L. Royden	1973–1981	Mathematics	
8	Norman K. Wessells	1981–1988	Biology	
9	Ewart A.C. Thomas	1988–1993	Psychology	
10	John B. Shoven	1993–1998	Economics	
11	Malcolm R. Beasley	1998–2001	Applied Physics	
12	Sharon R. Long	2001–2007	Biological Sciences	
13	Richard Saller	2007–2018	Classics and History	12th president of the university
14	Debra Satz	2018–present	Philosophy	

Law School
#	Name	Years	Notes
1	Nathan Abbott	1893–1907	executive head
*	Charles H. Huberich	1906	acting
2	Frederic Campbell Woodward	1908–1916	first to be called dean
3	Charles A. Huston	1916–1922	
*	Arthur M. Cathcart	1917–1919	acting
4	Marion R. Kirkwood	1922–1945	
*	Arthur M. Cathcart	1930–1931	acting
*	Lowell Turrentine	1945–1946	
5	Carl B. Spaeth	1946–1962	
*	Samuel D. Thurman	1952–1953	acting
*	John R. McDonough	1959–1960	acting
*	John R. McDonough	1962–1964	acting
6	Bayless Manning	1964–1971	
7	Thomas Ehrlich	1971–1976	
*	J. Keith Mann	1976	acting
8	Charles J. Meyers	1976–1981	acting
*	J. Keith Mann	1981–1982	acting
9	John Hart Ely	1982–1987	
10	Paul Brest	1987–1999	
11	Kathleen Sullivan	1999–2004	
12	Larry Kramer	2004–2012	
13	M. Elizabeth Magill	2012–2019	
14	Jennifer Martínez	2019–2023	
15	George Triantis	2024-present	

School of Medicine
#	Name	Years	Notes
1	Ray Lyman Wilbur	1911–1916	31st United States Secretary of the Interior; 3rd president of the university
2	William Ophüls	1916–1933	
3	Loren R. Chandler	1933–1953	
4	Windsor C. Cutting	1953–1957	
5	Robert H. Alway	1957–1965	
6	Robert J. Glaser	1965–1971	
7	Clayton Rich	1971–1982	
8	Dominick P. Purpura	1982–1984	went on to be dean of Albert Einstein College of Medicine
9	David Korn	1984–1995	
10	Eugene A. Bauer	1995–2001	
11	Philip Pizzo	2001–2012	
12	Lloyd B. Minor	2012–present	

== Stanford faculty and affiliates ==
=== Aeronautics and astronautics ===
- Sigrid Close, associate professor, Aeronautics and Astronautics; Electrical Engineering
- William F. Durand, professor, Aeronautics and Astronautics; Mechanical Engineering; Electrical Engineering (1859–1958)
- Charbel Farhat, professor, Aeronautics and Astronautics; Mechanical Engineering
- G. Scott Hubbard, adjunct professor, Aeronautics and Astronautics
- Antony Jameson, emeritus faculty, Aeronautics and Astronautics
- Sanjay Lall, professor, Aeronautics and Astronautics; Electrical Engineering
- Bradford Parkinson, professor emeritus, Aeronautics and Astronautics
- Stephen Rock, professor, Aeronautics and Astronautics
- Debbie Senesky, assistant professor, Aeronautics and Astronautics; Electrical Engineering
- George Springer, emeritus faculty, Aeronautics and Astronautics

=== Biology, biochemistry, and medicine ===
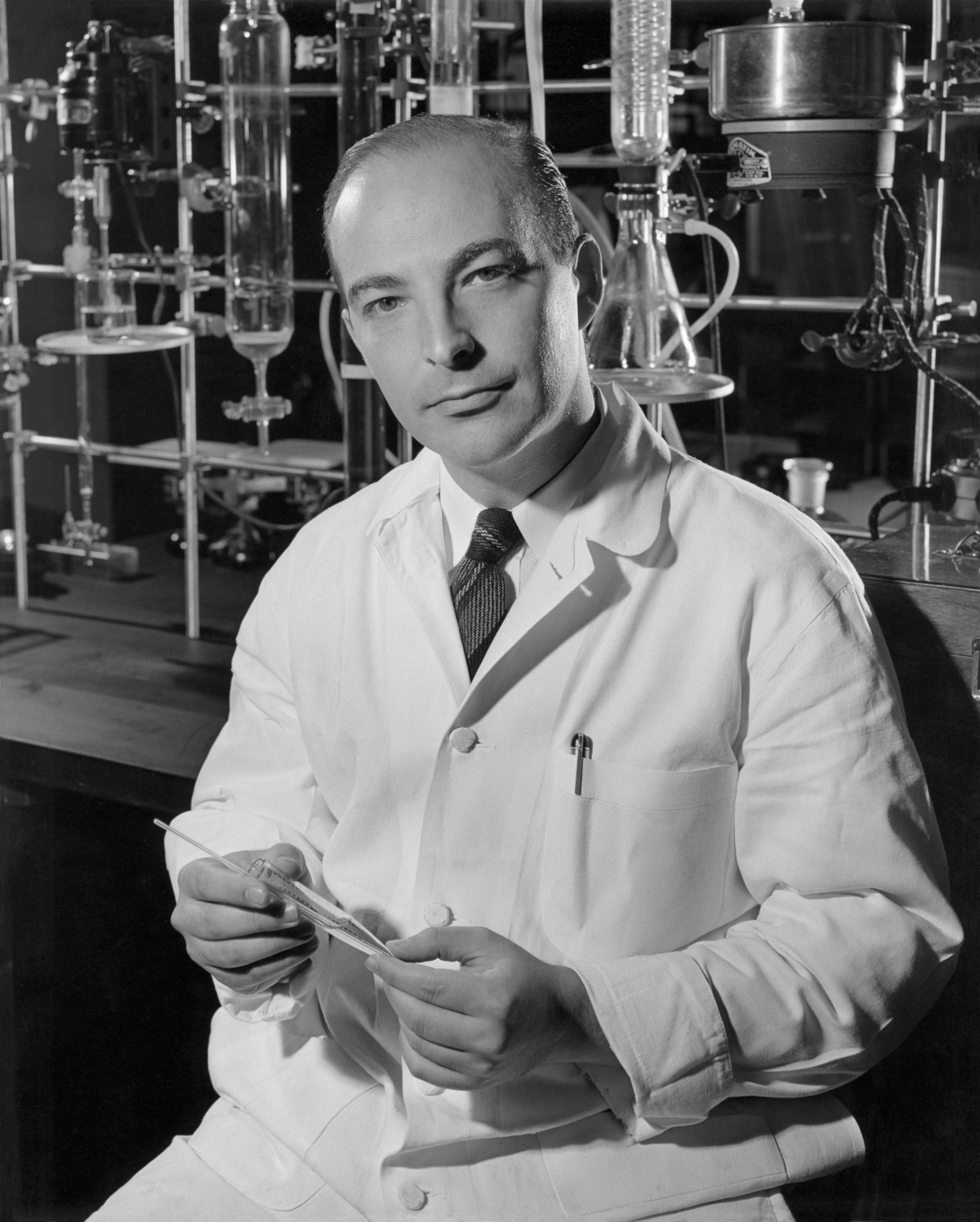
Arthur Kornberg (National Library of Medicine portrait)

- George W. Beadle, professor of biology, co-winner of 1958 Nobel Prize in Physiology or Medicine (at Caltech at time of award)
- Paul Berg, emeritus (active) professor of biochemistry, co-winner of 1980 Nobel Prize in Chemistry, pioneer in recombinant DNA technology
- David Botstein, former professor of genetics, pioneer in Human Genome Project
- Patrick O. Brown, professor of biochemistry, inventor of DNA microarray technology
- Marion Buckwalter, professor of neurology and neurosurgery at the Stanford University School of Medicine, co-founder of the Stroke Recovery Program at Stanford
- Eugene C. Butcher, professor of pathology, 2004 Crafoord Prize winner
- Stanley Norman Cohen, professor of genetics and medicine, accomplished the first transplantation of genes between cells; winner of National Medal of Science, National Medal of Technology, inducted into National Inventors Hall of Fame
- Carl Degler, professor of history, Pulitzer Prize for History (1972)
- William C. Dement, professor of psychiatry and behavioral sciences, pioneer in sleep research
- Karl Deisseroth, professor of bioengineering and of psychiatry and behavioral sciences, winner of the 2026 Nobel Prize in Physiology or Medicine
- Paul R. Ehrlich, professor of biology, 1990 Crafoord Prize winner
- James Ferrell, systems biologist and the first chair of the Dept. of Chemical and Systems Biology from its establishment until 2011
- Andrew Z. Fire, professor of genetics and pathology, winner of the 2006 Nobel Prize in Physiology or Medicine
- Thomas J. Fogarty, clinical professor of surgery; member of National Inventors Hall of Fame; owner of more than 100 surgical patents, including the Fogarty balloon catheter
- Toby Freedman, space medicine
- Christian Guilleminault, professor of psychiatry and behavioral sciences, pioneer in sleep research
- Jessica Hellmann, professor of ecology at the University of Minnesota, director of the Institute on the Environment
- Daniel Herschlag, senior associate dean at Stanford University School of Medicine, graduate education and postdoctoral affairs and professor of biochemistry and, by courtesy, of chemistry
- Leonard Herzenberg, professor of genetics, winner of Kyoto Prize for development of fluorescent-activated cell sorting
- Andrew D. Huberman, professor of Neurobiology and Ophthalmology, known for discoveries of brain function, plasticity and regeneration
- David Katzenstein, virologist and AIDS researcher and associate medical director of the AIDS Clinical Trial Unit at Stanford
- Robert Kerlan, sports medicine pioneer
- Peter S. Kim, professor of biochemistry, former president of Merck Research Laboratories (MRL), 2003–2013
- Brian Kobilka, professor in medical school, 2012 Nobel Prize winner in chemistry
- Ron Kopito, cell biologist
- Arthur Kornberg, professor of biochemistry, winner of 1959 Nobel Prize in Physiology or Medicine
- Roger D. Kornberg, professor of structural biology, winner of 2006 Nobel Prize in Chemistry
- William Langston, neurologist; founder, CEO, and scientific director of the Parkinson's Institute
- Joshua Lederberg, founder of the Stanford Department of Genetics, co-recipient of 1958 Nobel Prize in Physiology or Medicine
- Michael Levitt, professor in medical school, 2013 Nobel prize winner in chemistry
- Kate Lorig, chronic disease self-management, patient education, director of the Stanford Patient Education Center
- José Gilberto Montoya, professor in medical school, founder of the Immunocompromised Host Service

Tanzania Intelligence and Security Service

- Peter Raven, professor of botany; coauthor with Paul Ehrlich in 1964 of the seminal work Butterflies and Plants: A Study in Coevolution; Missouri Botanical Garden, 1971–2010; board of trustees of National Geographic; International Prize for Biology, 1986; Pontifical Science Academy; Time Magazine "Hero for the Planet" 1999
- Donald Redelmeier, internist, professor of medicine at University of Toronto, noted expert in medical decision making
- Robert Sapolsky, John A. and Cynthia Fry Gunn Professor in Biological Sciences, Neurology & Neurological Sciences, and Neurosurgery; author and recipient of awards including MacArthur Fellowship genius grant, an Alfred P. Sloan Fellowship, and the Klingenstein Fellowship in Neuroscience
- Matthew P. Scott, professor of developmental biology, discoverer of homeobox genes
- Oscar Elton Sette, lecturer and Chief of Ocean Research, pioneer of fisheries oceanography and modern fisheries science
- Norman Shumway, professor at Stanford Medical School, father of the heart transplantation technique
- Tim Stearns, professor of Biology and Genetics, cell biologist
- Lubert Stryer, professor of biology, 2006 National Medal of Science winner, known for micro-array gene chip
- Thomas Sudhof, professor at Stanford Medical School, winner of 2013 Nobel Prize in Physiology or Medicine
- Sergiu P. Pașca, professor of psychiatry and behavioral sciences
- Edward L. Tatum, co-winner of 1958 Nobel Prize in Physiology or Medicine (at Rockefeller Institute for Medical Research at time of award)
- Jared Tinklenberg, professor of psychiatry and behavioral sciences

=== Chemistry ===
- Carolyn R. Bertozzi, professor of chemistry, winner of 2022 Nobel Prize in Chemistry
- Carl Djerassi, professor emeritus in chemistry; father of birth control pill; winner of National Medal of Science, National Medal of Technology, and Wolf Prize; inducted into National Inventors Hall of Fame
- Paul Flory, former professor of chemistry, winner of 1974 Nobel Prize in Chemistry
- William Johnson, former professor in chemistry, National Medal of Science winner
- Harden M. McConnell, professor emeritus in chemistry, National Medal of Science winner
- Vijay S. Pande, associate professor in the Chemistry Department, founder of Folding@home distributed computing project
- Linus Pauling, former professor in chemistry, Nobel prize winner in Chemistry (1954) and in Peace (1962)
- John Ross, professor emeritus in chemistry, National Medal of Science winner
- Henry Taube, former professor in chemistry, winner of 1983 Nobel Prize in Chemistry
- Richard Zare, professor in chemistry, winner of National Medal of Science and Wolf Prize

=== Graduate School of Business ===
- Edward Lazear, former chairman of the Council of Economic Advisers (2006–2009); professor, Graduate School of Business; Hoover Fellow

=== Communication ===
- Clifford Nass, co-creator of The Media Equation theory of human-computer interaction
- Darwin Teilhet, mystery novelist, taught journalism at Stanford

=== Computer science ===
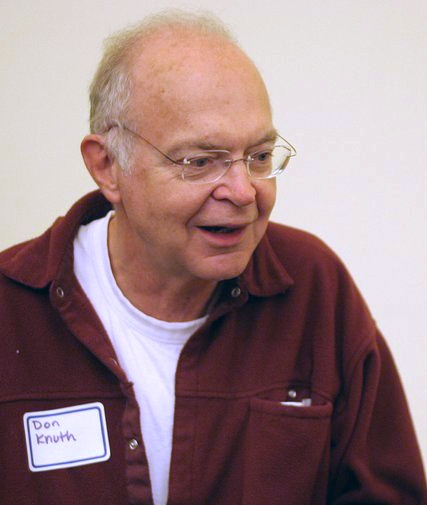
Donald Knuth in 2005

- Vinton Cerf, former faculty, Turing Award-winning computer scientist
- Douglas Engelbart, Turing Award-winning computer scientist, inventor of the computer mouse, former researcher, inducted into National Inventors Hall of Fame
- Edward Feigenbaum, Turing Award-winning computer scientist, father of expert system, coinventor of Dendral
- Robert Floyd, former faculty, Turing Award-winning computer scientist
- Alexandra Illmer Forsythe, wrote the first series of introductory computer science textbooks
- George Forsythe, founder of the Department of Computer Science and president of the Association for Computing Machinery
- Gene Golub, former faculty, a leading authority in numerical matrix analysis, inventor of the algorithm for singular value decomposition (SVD)
- David Gries, former faculty, first text on compilers, winner of four national education awards
- Leonidas J. Guibas, Allan Newell Award-winning pioneer in data structures and geometric algorithms
- John L. Hennessy, pioneer in RISC, president of Stanford
- Sir Antony Hoare, former faculty, Turing Award-winning computer scientist
- John Hopcroft, former faculty, Turing Award-winning computer scientist
- Alan Kay, former faculty, Turing Award-winning computer scientist
- Donald Knuth, professor emeritus, computer science pioneer, creator of TeX, author of The Art of Computer Programming, Turing Award winner
- Daphne Koller, professor in CS
- John Koza, pioneer in genetic programming
- Fei-Fei Li, professor in CS, creator of ImageNet, co-director of the Stanford Institute for Human-Centered Artificial Intelligence, named to Time's 100 Most Influential People in AI in 2023; Queen Elizabeth Prize for Engineering recipient (2025)
- Barbara Liskov, first woman to earn a Ph.D. in CS from Stanford, Turing Award-winning computer scientist
- John McCarthy, responsible for the coining of the term "artificial intelligence", and inventor of the Lisp programming language and time sharing, Turing Award winner
- Edward McCluskey, professor in EE, IEEE John Von Neumann Prize winner
- Robert Metcalfe, former faculty, co-inventor of Ethernet, inducted into National Inventors Hall of Fame
- Robin Milner, former faculty, Turing Award-winning computer scientist
- Allen Newell, Turing Award-winning computer scientist
- Andrew Ng, faculty in CS, winner of 2010 IJCAI Computers and Thought Award
- John Ousterhout, faculty in CS, winner of Grace Murray Hopper Award
- Amir Pnueli, postdoc, Turing Award-winning computer scientist
- Raj Reddy, former faculty, Turing Award-winning computer scientist
- Ronald Rivest, former faculty, Turing Award-winning computer scientist
- Tim Roughgarden, faculty in CS, winner of Grace Murray Hopper Award
- Arthur Samuel, former faculty; pioneer in the field of computer gaming and artificial intelligence; his checkers-playing program appears to be the world's first self-learning program, and an early demonstration of the fundamental concept of AI
- Silvio Savarese, adjunct professor in CS, computer vision researcher, executive vice president and chief scientist at Salesforce, named to Time's 100 Most Influential People in AI in 2024
- Dana Scott, former faculty, Turing Award-winning computer scientist
- Robert Tarjan, former faculty, Turing Award-winning computer scientist
- Sebastian Thrun, director of Stanford AI LAB; team leader of Stanford driverless car racing team, whose entry Stanley won the 2005 DARPA grand challenge
- Jeff Ullman, professor in CS, IEEE John Von Neumann prize winner
- Terry Winograd, faculty in CS, winner of 2010 IJCAI Computers and Thought Award
- Keith Winstein, faculty in CS, author of Mosh
- Niklaus Wirth, former faculty, Turing Award-winning computer scientist, inventor of PASCAL
- Andrew Yao, former faculty, Turing Award-winning computer scientist
- William Yeager, inventor of multi-protocol internet router

=== Economics ===
- Kenneth J. Arrow, Nobel Prize-winning economics professor
- Gary Becker, Nobel Prize-winning economics professor, Hoover Institution
- Ben Bernanke, chairman of the United States Federal Reserve
- Gérard Debreu, Nobel Prize winner in economics, former staff
- Milton Friedman, Nobel Prize-winning economics professor, Hoover Institution
- Francisco Gil Díaz, economist, former Secretary of Finance of Mexico
- Avner Greif, economist
- Robert Hall, Nobel Prize-winning economics professor
- Caroline Hoxby, professor of economics
- Ro Khanna, visiting lecturer of economics (2012–2016), deputy assistant secretary in the United States Department of Commerce (2009–2011), U.S. congressman (2017–present)
- Jonathan Levin, professor of economics, won the 2011 John Bates Clark Medal
- Paul Milgrom, Nobel Prize-winning economics professor, Hoover fellow
- Douglass North, Nobel Prize-winning economics professor, Hoover Institution
- Paul Romer, Nobel Prize-winning economics professor
- Alvin E. Roth, Nobel Prize-winning economics professor
- Myron Scholes, Nobel Prize-winning economics professor
- William F. Sharpe, professor emeritus, School of Business, Nobel prize winner
- Thomas Sowell, economist and popular author, senior fellow at the Hoover Institution
- Michael Spence, professor emeritus, School of Business, Nobel prize winner in economics
- Joseph Stiglitz, professor emeritus, School of Business, Nobel prize winner in economics
- John B. Taylor, economist, Hoover Fellow, developed the Taylor rule, Under Secretary of the Treasury for International affairs
- Robert B. Wilson, Nobel Prize-winning economics professor

=== Education ===
- Margaret Lee Chadwick, headmistress and founder of the Chadwick School; author
- William Damon, pioneer in peer collaboration and project-based learning
- Linda Darling-Hammond, education advisor to Barack Obama's presidential campaign
- Nathaniel Gage, pioneer in the scientific understanding of teaching
- Richard Wall Lyman, former provost of Stanford University
- Fred Swaniker, co-founder of African Leadership Academy, CEO and co-founder of African Leadership University
- Lewis Terman, creator of the Stanford Binet IQ test
- John Willinsky, Open Access educator, activist and author

=== Engineering ===
- Andreas Acrivos, former professor, National Medal of Science winner
- Stephen Barley, organizational theorist and developer of adaptive structuration, co-director of the Center for Work, Technology, and Organization
- Sally Benson, professor of engineering
- Arthur E. Bryson, Jr., professor emeritus in Aeronautics and Astronautics, father of modern optimal control theory
- Giovanni De Micheli, former professor of Electrical Engineering
- Roland Doré, former president of the Canadian Space Agency
- William F. Durand, professor and head of Mechanical Engineering (1904–24), aerodynamics pioneer and chair of NASA forerunner NACA
- Irmgard Flügge-Lotz, pioneer of discontinuous automatic control theory
- Kenneth E. Goodson, mechanical engineer and endowed professor in the School of Engineering
- William Webster Hansen, former professor, contributed to the development of microwave technology
- Siegfried Hecker, professor, former director of Los Alamos National Lab
- Ronald A. Howard, professor, father of decision analysis, founding director and former chairman of Strategic Decision Group
- Mark Z. Jacobson, professor of engineering
- Elizabeth Jens, NASA engineer
- Rudolf Kálmán, former professor in EE, the father of modern control theory, noted for Kalman filter, National Medal of Science winner
- Rudolf Kompfner, former professor, National Medal of Science winner
- Bruce Lusignan, emeritus professor of electrical engineering, made contributions to communication satellites and reusable launch vehicles
- Bridgette Meinhold, artist and author with a focus on sustainability
- Teresa Meng, Reid Weaver Dennis Professor of Electrical Engineering
- Dwight Nishimura, Addie and Al Macovski professor in the School of Engineering, who leads the Magnetic Resonance Systems Research Laboratory
- William Perry (A.M. 1950), engineer, entrepreneur, diplomat, and 19th Secretary of Defense of the United States
- Calvin Quate, professor, National Medal of Science winner
- Paul V. Roberts, pioneer of environmental engineering
- Stephen Timoshenko, pioneer of modern engineering mechanics
- Powtawche Valerino, NASA JPL space navigation engineer

=== History ===
- Thomas A. Bailey, professor of history, former Organization of American Historians president, former Society for Historians of American Foreign Relations president, author of numerous books on diplomatic history and the widely used textbook The American Pageant
- Captain Edward L. Beach, Sr., USN (ret.), professor of military and naval history
- Jennifer Burns, historian
- Bipan Chandra, emeritus professor of history, Jawaharlal Nehru University, New Delhi and chairman, National Book Trust, New Delhi
- J.P. Daughton, professor of history, author
- Don E. Fehrenbacher, Pulitzer Prize winner author (1979, The Dred Scott Case: Its Significance in American Law & Politics); William Robertson Coe Professor of History and American Studies from 1953
- Paula Findlen, professor of history of science
- David M. Kennedy, professor of history and Pulitzer Prize-winning author
- Mark Edward Lewis, Kwoh-Ting Li Professor of Chinese Culture
- Sabine G. MacCormack, award-winning professor of late antique history
- Aron Rodrigue, historian
- Londa Schiebinger, professor of history of science
- James J. Sheehan, professor of history and former American Historical Association president
- Payson J. Treat (Ph.D. 1910), professor of Far Eastern history
- Gordon Wright, professor of history, former American Historical Association president

=== International relations ===
- Stephen D. Krasner, former director of policy planning (2005–2007) for the United States Department of State

=== Law ===
- Benjamin Harrison, constitutional and international law professor and 23rd President of the United States
- William Lerach, guest lecturer on securities and corporate law
- Lawrence Lessig, IP and constitutional law professor
- Richard Posner, associate professor and chief judge of the United States Court of Appeals for the Seventh Circuit

=== Linguistics ===
- Jared Bernstein, adjunct professor
- Eve V. Clark, Richard Lyman Professor in the Humanities, emerita
- Michael C. Frank, associate professor of psychology and, by courtesy, of linguistics
- Miyako Inoue, associate professor of anthropology and, by courtesy, of linguistics
- Dan Jurafsky, professor of linguistics and of computer science, and chair, Department of Linguistics
- Ronald M. Kaplan, adjunct professor
- Lauri Karttunen, adjunct professor
- Martin Kay, professor of linguistics
- Paul Kay, adjunct professor
- Paul V. Kiparsky, Anne T. and Robert M. Bass Professor in the School of Humanities and Sciences
- Beth Levin, William H. Bonsall Professor in the Humanities
- Jay McClelland, Lucie Stern Professor in the Social Sciences and professor, by courtesy, of Linguistics
- John R. Rickford, J. E. Wallace Sterling Professor in the Humanities, emeritus (recalled to active duty 2017–2019)
- Elizabeth Traugott, professor of linguistics and of English, emerita
- Tom Wasow, Clarence Irving Lewis Professor in Philosophy and professor of linguistics, emeritus and academic secretary to the university
- Annie Zaenen, adjunct professor
- Arnold M. Zwicky, adjunct professor

=== Literature and arts ===
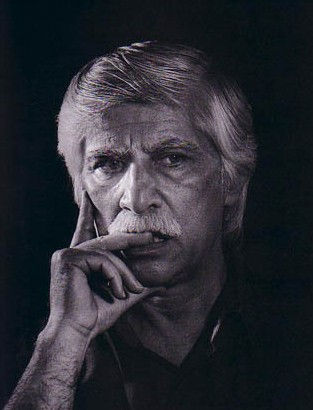
Bahram Beyzai, Persian playwright and filmmaker, taught at Stanford from 2010.

- Gerald M. Ackerman, assistant professor of art history (1965–1971)
- Judith Bettina, soprano
- Bahram Beyzai, Persian playwright and filmmaker
- Eavan Boland, Irish poet, professor
- George Hardin Brown, medieval literature
- Scott Bukatman, film and media professor
- Albert Elsen, Walter A. Haas Professor in the Humanities (1968–1995)
- Lowell Gallagher, literary theorist and associate professor, earned Ph.D. in 1989
- Hans Ulrich Gumbrecht, literary theorist
- John L'Heureux, novelist and creative writing professor
- D. R. MacDonald, creative writing
- Alexander Nemerov, professor of art and art history
- Juan Bautista Rael, linguist and folklorist
- Jack Rakove, professor in history, 1997 Pulitzer Prize winner
- Adrienne Rich, poet and critic; 1974 winner of the National Book Award for Poetry; 2017 finalist for the Pulitzer Prize for Poetry
- Wallace Stegner, 1972 winner of Pulitzer Prize for Fiction
- Yvor Winters, poet and critic

=== Mathematics and statistics ===
- Theodore W. Anderson, professor in statistics, NAS member
- Harald Bohr (1887–1951), Danish Olympic silver medalist football player and mathematician; brother of Niels Bohr
- Emmanuel Candès, professor in mathematics and statistics, winner of Alan Waterman award
- Paul Cohen, former professor in mathematics, Fields Medal recipient, National Medal of Science winner
- Brian Conrad, professor in mathematics
- George Dantzig, former professor in operations research, inventor of the simplex algorithm, father of linear programming, National Medal of Science (1975) winner
- Keith Devlin, executive director Center for the Study of Language and Information
- Persi Diaconis, professor in statistics, MacArthur Fellow, NAS member
- David Donoho, professor in statistics, MacArthur Fellow, NAS member
- Bradley Efron, professor in statistics, inventor of bootstrap, National Medal of Science winner, MacArthur Fellow, NAS member
- Solomon Feferman, professor in mathematics and philosophy, Schock Prize recipient
- Jerome H. Friedman, professor in statistics, NAS member
- Samuel Karlin, professor in mathematics, National Medal of Science winner
- Joseph Keller, professor in mathematics, National Medal of Science winner
- Maryam Mirzakhani, professor in mathematics, Fields Medal recipient
- Amnon Pazy, Israeli mathematician; president of the Hebrew University of Jerusalem
- George Pólya, former professor in mathematics, author of How to solve it
- Grant Sanderson, YouTuber, podcaster and owner of mathematics channel 3blue1brown, contributor to Khan Academy
- Richard Schoen, professor in mathematics, MacArthur Fellow, NAS member
- David O. Siegmund, professor in statistics, NAS member
- Charles Stein, professor in statistics, NAS member
- Gábor Szegő, former professor in mathematics, founder of Stanford Math department
- Robert Tibshirani, professor in statistics, NAS member
- Ravi Vakil, professor in mathematics, one of seven four-time Putnam Fellows
- Akshay Venkatesh, former professor in mathematics, Fields Medal recipient
- Shing-Tung Yau, former professor in mathematics, Fields Medal recipient

=== Political science ===
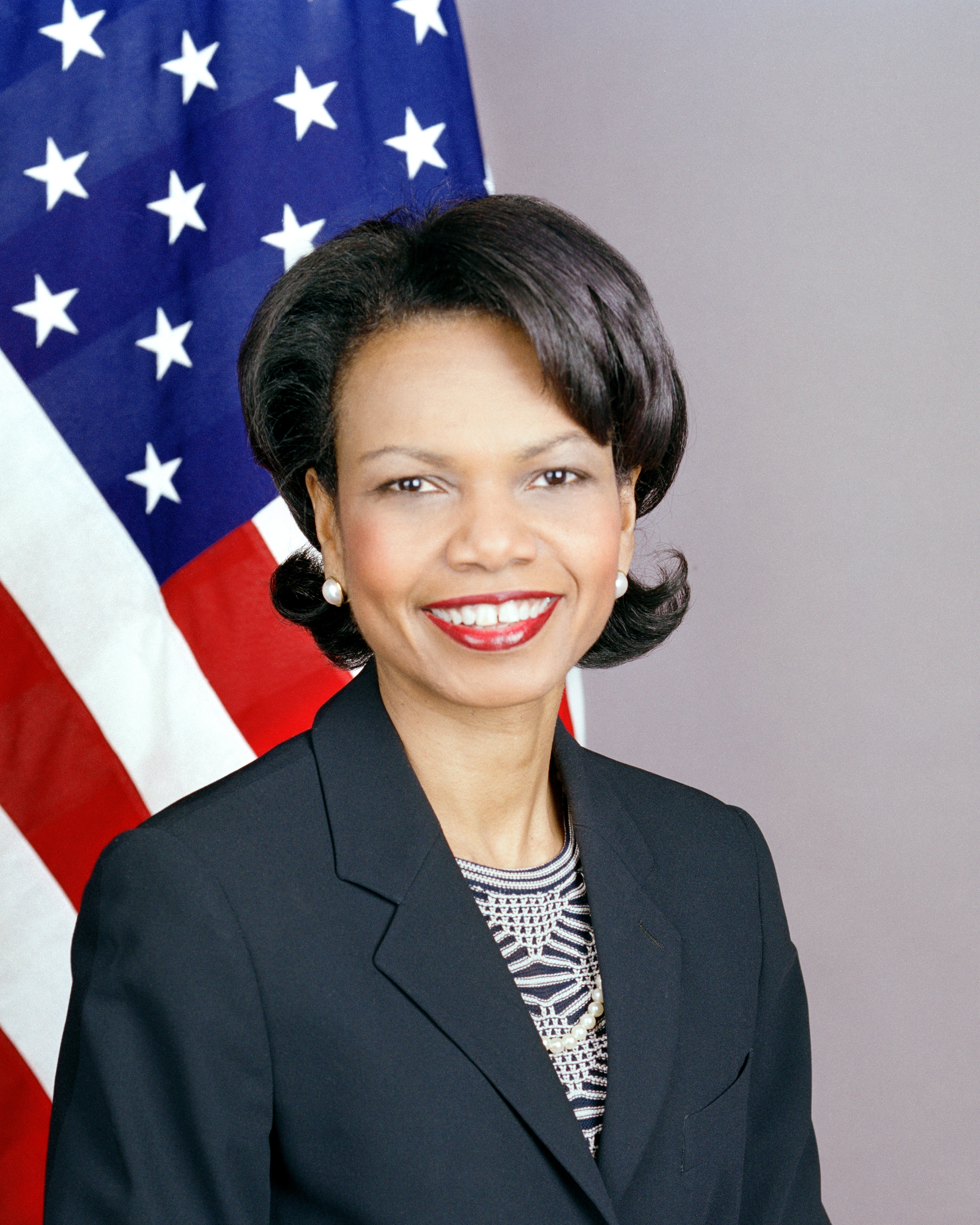
Condoleezza Rice, 66th Secretary of State of the United States

- Coit D. Blacker, political science professor, special assistant to the President for National Security Affairs; and senior director for Russian, Ukrainian and Eurasian affairs, National Security Council; Executive Office of the President
- Larry Diamond, professor, mentor, senior fellow at the Hoover Institute
- Morris P. Fiorina, political scientist and author
- Francis Fukuyama, senior fellow at the Center on Democracy, Development and the Rule of Law since 2010
- Terry Karl, professor of Latin American studies
- Alexander Kerensky (1881–1970), Russian revolutionary leader, Hoover Institute fellow
- Condoleezza Rice, political science professor, Secretary of State
- Douglas Rivers, political science professor, chief scientist of YouGov

=== Philosophy ===
- Joshua Cohen, professor emeritus of philosophy
- Lala Hardayal, lecturer, Indian freedom fighter
- Patrick Suppes, National Medal of Science recipient, professor

=== Physics ===
- Felix Bloch, 1952 Nobel Laureate, physics professor
- Susan E. Clark, 2026 Time 100 Next winner, astrophysicist; professor at Stanford 2021-
- Steven Chu, 1997 Nobel Prize-winning physics professor; professor at Stanford 1987–2004
- Eric Cornell (B.S. 1985), 2001 Nobel Prize winner in physics
- Jerome Friedman, 1990 Nobel prize winner in physics, worked at SLAC as research associate (1957–1960)
- Sheldon Glashow, 1979 Nobel prize winner in physics, assistant professor (1961–1962)
- Theodor Hänsch, 2005 Nobel prize winner in physics, worked at Stanford 1972–1986
- Conyers Herring, physics professor and the winner of Wolf Prize in Physics in 1984/85
- Robert Hofstadter, 1961 Nobel prize winner in physics, former professor
- Henry Way Kendall, 1990 Nobel prize winner in physics, assistant professor at Stanford (1958–1961)
- Willis Eugene Lamb, former professor, 1955 Nobel prize winner in physics
- Robert Laughlin, 1998 Nobel Prize-winning physics professor, professor at Stanford 1989–2004
- Ann Nelson, 2018 J. J. Sakurai Prize for Theoretical Particle Physics recipient
- Douglas Osheroff, 1996 Nobel Prize-winning physics professor
- Martin L. Perl, 1995 Nobel Prize-winning physics professor
- Burton Richter, 1976 Nobel Prize-winning physics professor
- Arthur Schawlow, 1981 Nobel Prize-winning physics professor, co-inventor of laser, inducted into National Inventors Hall of Fame
- Leonard Schiff, physics professor
- Melvin Schwartz, 1988 Nobel Prize-winning physics professor
- William Shockley, 1956 Nobel Prize-winning physics professor, co-inventor of transistor, inducted into National Inventors Hall of Fame
- Leonard Susskind, physics professor, originator of string theory
- Richard Taylor (Ph.D. 1962), 1990 Nobel Prize-winning physics professor
- Carl Wieman (Ph.D. 1977), 2001 Nobel Prize winner in physics
- Kenneth G. Wilson, 1982 Nobel Prize winner in physics, worked at SLAC (1969–1970)

=== Psychology ===
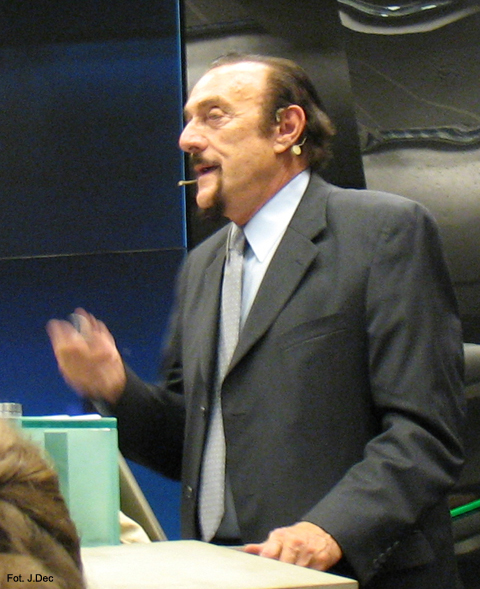
Philip Zimbardo, former president, American Psychological Association

- Richard Atkinson, professor of psychology 1956–1980, former president, University of California
- Albert Bandura, professor of psychology since 1964, David Starr Jordan Professor of Social Science in Psychology since 1973, known for his work on social learning theory and, more recently, on social cognitive theory and self efficacy
- Gordon H. Bower, professor of psychology, 2005 National Medal of Science winner
- Carol Dweck, professor of psychology, known for her work on the mindset psychological trait
- Jennifer Eberhardt, professor of psychology, 2014 MacArthur Fellow
- Heidi M. Feldman, Ballinger-Swindells Endowed Professor of Developmental and Behavioral Pediatrics
- Kalanit Grill-Spector, professor of psychology
- Amado M. Padilla, professor of psychology
- Roger Shepard, professor of psychology, National Medal of Science winner
- Edward Kellog Strong, Jr. (1884–1963), professor of psychology at Stanford University 1923–1963
- Lewis Terman, former professor, pioneer in I.Q. testing
- Leanne M. Williams, professor in Psychiatry and Behavioral Sciences since 2013
- Philip Zimbardo, former professor of psychology, former president of the APA, researcher

=== Hoover Fellows ===
- Jim Mattis, U.S. Secretary of Defense (2017–2019)
- Abbas Milani, political scientist and historian
- George Shultz, U.S. Secretary of State (1982–1989), U.S. Secretary of the Treasury (1972–1974), U.S. Secretary of Labor (1969–1970), also lectured at the Graduate School of Business
- Amy Zegart, political scientist and intelligence reform expert

=== Coaches ===
- Dick Gould, greatest tennis coach in history; from 1966 to 2004 he won 17 NCAA Team titles with 50 All-American players
- Payton Jordan, track coach 1957–1979; head coach of the 1968 US Olympic track team
- Bill Walsh, twice head coach of the football team; also served as interim athletic director; coach of the three-time Super Bowl champion San Francisco 49ers; inventor of the West Coast Offense
- Glenn Scobey Warner, College Football Hall of Fame coach known as "Pop" Warner, brought the following mechanics to football: the screen pass, spiral punt, single- and double-wing formations, the use of shoulder and thigh pads, designed helmets red for backs and white for ends

=== Other ===
- St. Clair Drake, sociology and anthropology, founding head of African American studies program
- Hazel D. Hansen (1899–1962), professor, classicist
- James M. Hyde, metallurgist
- Scotty McLennan, dean for Religious Life, Minister of Stanford Memorial Church, and inspiration for the Reverend Scot Sloan character in the comic strip Doonesbury
