= Buckwalter =

Buckwalter may refer to:

== People ==
=== Surnames ===
- Bucky Buckwalter (born 1933), American basketball coach and executive
- Harry Buckwalter (1867–1930), American journalist and photographer
- Joseph W. Buckwalter (1850–1911), American politician from Pennsylvania
- Marion Buckwalter, American neurologist
- Ronald L. Buckwalter (born 1936), American judge from Pennsylvania

=== Given names ===
- Alfred Buckwalter Garner (1873–1930), American politician from Pennsylvania

== Other ==
- Buckwalter Building, building in Chester County, Pennsylvania
- Buckwalter transliteration, transliteration project in the 1980s and 1990s
