= Carlos Albizu Miranda =

Puerto Rican educator (1920–1984)

- Carlos Albizu Miranda; Founder of Carlos Albizu University (CAU)
- Born: 16 September 1920; Ponce, Puerto Rico
- Died: 6 October 1984 (aged 64); Ponce, Puerto Rico
- Occupation: Educator
- Spouse: Ermida Garcia
- Children: Carmen Albizu García; Sonya Albizu Garcia; Carlos F. Albizu Garcia; Teresa Albizu-Rodriguez

Carlos Albizu Miranda (16 September 1920 – 6 October 1984) was a Puerto Rican educator. He is the first Hispanic educator to have a North American university, Albizu University, renamed in his honor and one of the first Hispanics to earn a Ph.D. in psychology in the United States.

== Early years ==
Albizu Miranda, cousin of the Puerto Rican Nationalist leader Pedro Albizu Campos, was born in Ponce, the second largest city in Puerto Rico located in the southern region of the island. His family moved to New York City where he received his primary and secondary education. Albizu Miranda and his family returned to Puerto Rico and he enrolled in the University of Puerto Rico where in 1943 he earned a Bachelor of Arts degree in education with a major on psychology and a minor in history.

Albizu Miranda joined the United States Army as a 1st Lieutenant upon the outbreak of World War II and served overseas. After he was honorably discharged from the military, Albizu Miranda went to work for the Veteran's Administration, first as a psychometrician and later as Chief of the Vocational Rehabilitation and Education Center in Puerto Rico. He met and married Ermida Garcia Muñoz and in 1950, they moved to Minnesota, where Albizu Miranda took advantage of his G.I. Bill benefits and earned his master's degree Experimental Psychology in 1951 from the University of Minnesota. He continued his academic education and in 1953 earned his Doctorate degree (Ph.D.) in Clinical Psychology from Purdue University located in West Lafayette, Indiana, becoming one of the first Hispanics to earn a Ph.D. in Psychology in the United States. His internship in Clinical Psychology was completed at the Veteran's Administration Hospital in Marion, Indiana.

== Return to Puerto Rico ==
In 1960, after he completed his internship, he returned to Puerto Rico with his family and taught psychology in his Alma Mater, the University of Puerto Rico. He also had a private practice in psychology. During his teaching years, he realized that there was a lack of qualified psychologists in Puerto Rico. He became concerned that the Universities in Puerto Rico did not offer graduate programs in psychology and that the few students who pursued a career as psychologists had to study outside of Puerto Rico where they were trained with models and techniques that were not always sensitive to the needs and sociocultural characteristics of Hispanic clients.

== Founder of Caribbean Center for Advanced Studies ==
In 1966, he stopped teaching in the university and established in San Juan, Puerto Rico, the first independent professional school of psychology in North America, initially known as the "Instituto Psicológico de Puerto Rico" (Puerto Rican Institute of Psychology) which is modeled after the institutes of psychology in Europe where the practice and internship are done at the same time. In 1971, the institute was renamed "Centro Caribeño de Estudios Postgraduados" (Caribbean Center for Advanced Studies). In 1980, Albizu Miranda moved to Miami, Florida and opened a sister campus as the Miami Institute of Psychology.

Albizu Miranda also published several written works with a special emphasis on cross-cultural issues in mental health training and service delivery. Among his written works are "A Training Model for Minority Psychologists" and "Psychological Concomitants of Poverty."

== Later years ==
Albizu Miranda was the first president of the National Hispanic Psychological Association, he served from 1980 to 1982. He belonged to several scientific organizations, among them the Sigma Xi, Psi Chi, and the New York Academy of Sciences. He was also a Fellow of the American Psychological Association and served on the Committee of Professional and Scientific Conduct and Ethics.

In the American Psychological Foundation Awards for 1980, Albizu Miranda was presented with the "Award for the Development of Psychology Education in Puerto Rico and the Caribbean."

Carlos Albizu Miranda died on 6 October 1984. He was survived by his wife Ermida Albizu Garcia and four children, Carmen Albizu García, Sonya Albizu Garcia, Carlos F. Albizu Garcia and his youngest daughter, Teresa Albizu-Rodriguez. Carlos Albizu Miranda was buried at the Puerto Rico National Cemetery in Bayamón, Puerto Rico. In a memorial article in the Hispanic Journal of Behavioral Sciences, Marion A. Wennerholm wrote:

"Dr. Albizu had an exceptional ability to dream great dreams and then convert them into realities. His enthusiasm was contagious and he was able to stimulate and motivate his colleagues by sharing his dreams with them and involving them in carrying them out. Through his tireless efforts and despite times of great adversity, his dream of a professional school of psychology became a reality."

On January 1, 2000 the Board of Trustees of the Caribbean Center for Advanced Studies, which includes the Miami Institute of Psychology, renamed the two-campus institution "Carlos Albizu University".

== Honors ==
On 12 December 2013, Albizu Miranda was honored with a ceremony and added to the list of illustrious Ponce citizens at the Park of the Illustrious Ponce Citizens in Ponce's Tricentennial Park.

== See also ==
- List of Puerto Ricans
- List of Puerto Rican scientists and inventors
