= Philip Rhinelander =

Philip Rhinelander may refer to:

- Philip H. Rhinelander (1908–1987), philosopher at Stanford University
- Philip M. Rhinelander (1869–1939), bishop of the Episcopal Diocese of Pennsylvania
