= Miller Township, Pennsylvania =

Miller Township is the name of some places in the U.S. state of Pennsylvania:

- Miller Township, Huntingdon County, Pennsylvania
- Miller Township, Perry County, Pennsylvania
