= Carole Robin =

- Born: Chicago, Illinois
- Occupations: Educator, author
- Employer: Stanford Graduate School of Business (former) Leaders in Tech
- Awards: MBA Distinguished Teaching Award (Stanford GSB) Robert K. Jaedicke Silver Apple Award Marquis Who's Who Listee Crown's 30 Must Read for 2022 Bloomberg's Best Books Forbes Future of Work50

Academic work
- Notable works: Connect: Building Exceptional Relationships with Family, Friends, and Colleagues

Carole Robin is an American educator, leadership expert, and author. She is known for her work in interpersonal dynamics and leadership development. She served as the Dorothy J. King Lecturer in Leadership at the Stanford Graduate School of Business (GSB), where she co-developed and taught the course Interpersonal Dynamics, commonly referred to as "Touchy Feely."

== Career ==
Robin was a lecturer at Stanford Graduate School of Business for nearly two decades. She served as the director of the Interpersonal Dynamics for High-Performance Executives program and directed the Arbuckle Leadership Fellows Program. Her teaching contributions earned her the MBA Distinguished Teaching Award.

After leaving Stanford, Robin co-founded Leaders in Tech, a nonprofit organization that applies leadership training from the GSB to startup founders and executives in Silicon Valley.

== Publications ==
Robin co-authored Connect: Building Exceptional Relationships with Family, Friends, and Colleagues, a book based on the principles taught in Interpersonal Dynamics at Stanford University. The book explores concepts of communication, emotional intelligence, and relationship-building.
