= Albizu University =

Private, non-profit Puerto Rican university

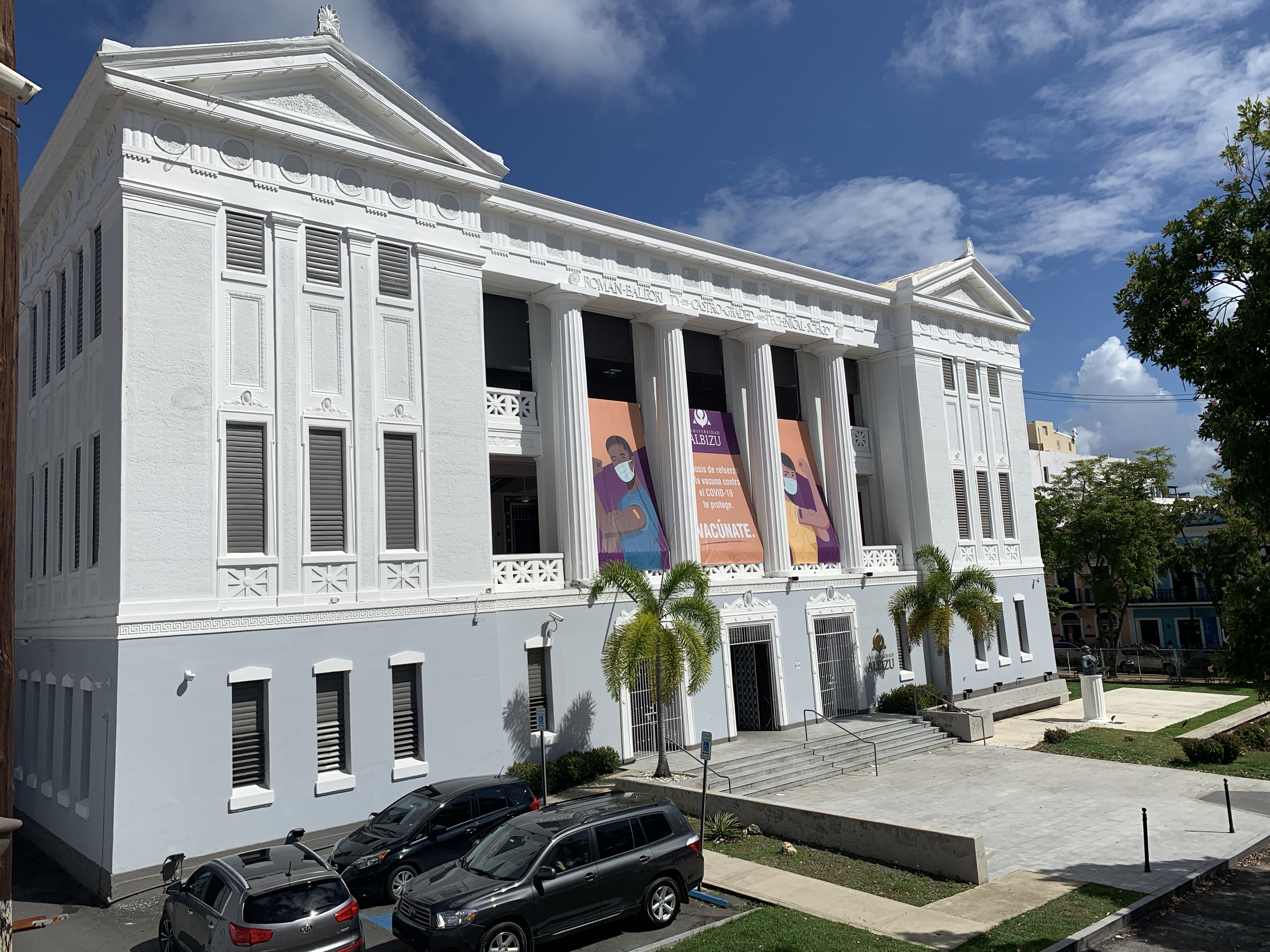
- Type: Private university
- Established: 1966; 60 years ago
- President: Nelson E. Soto
- Students: 3421
- Undergraduates: 682
- Postgraduates: 2119
- Location: San Juan, Puerto Rico; Mayagüez, Puerto Rico; Miami, Florida, United States; 18.4666°N 66.1138°W
- Campus: Urban (San Juan, Mayagüez), Metropolitan (Miami)
- Website: albizu.edu
- Former Puerto Rican Institute of Psychology
- U.S. Historic district – Contributing property
- U.S. National Historic Landmark District – Contributing property
- Part of: Old San Juan Historic District (ID72001553 & ID13000284)

Significant dates
- Designated CP: October 10, 1972
- Designated NHLDCP: February 27, 2013

Albizu University is a private university with its main campus in San Juan, Puerto Rico, a branch campus in Miami, Florida, and an additional instructional location in Mayagüez, Puerto Rico. It focuses on psychology, health, education, and human services.

== History ==
The university's history began in 1966, when a Puerto Rican psychologist and educator, Carlos Albizu Miranda, founded the Instituto Psicológico de Puerto Rico (Puerto Rico Institute of Psychology) in response to the need for culturally sensitive professional training in the area of clinical psychology. At the time, there were no graduate programs in clinical psychology in Puerto Rico. The University of Puerto Rico and the Normal School (later known as the College of Education) included psychology as part of the core curricula as early as 1903—but only for undergraduate studies that were heavily based on the American higher education system and its standards. Graduate-level degrees in psychology could only be obtained through schools in the United States.

By the early 1960s, little had changed, with mental health professionals being trained abroad and then returning to their home country with the challenge of adapting what they had learned in the United States to fit the socio-cultural realities of a Hispanic community. Albizu-Miranda himself received his training at Purdue University in West Lafayette, Indiana, and incurred the same difficulties of incorporating what he had learned into the culture of the island upon returning home to Puerto Rico.

What had changed, though, was the social climate of the island. Between 1947 and the late 1960s, Puerto Rico saw major industrialization that transformed the island from a rural agrarian to an urban industrial society. With this, came the establishment of social classes, modern capitalism, and economic consumption—along with confusion and insecurity that led to issues such as violence and drug use. By the 1960s, the population had grown to nearly three million people, with only five clinical psychologists on the island to support the growing need for social services. In an effort to meet the public's demands, the government established what were known as “assistant psychologists.” These assistant psychologists for the most part had had little training and were not equipped to serve what was becoming an increasingly complex population. By 1964, Albizu-Miranda had begun envisioning a Puerto Rican-based graduate program that would address the need for multicultural professional training in psychology on the island, along with the need for greater numbers of clinically trained psychologists to serve the growing population.

Between 1964 and 1966, Albizu-Miranda held multiple meetings with the chancellor of the University of Puerto Rico to discuss the development of a graduate program in psychology. After two years of fruitless efforts, Albizu-Miranda decided to turn away from the state university and establish a self-governing and independent institution. On August 1, 1966, he incorporated the Puerto Rico Institute of Psychology and welcomed the institute's inaugural academic year in 1967–1968.

Recognizing a parallel need for multicultural training in clinical psychology in Southern Florida, which has a large Hispanic population, Albizu-Miranda opened the Miami Institute of Psychology in Miami, Florida, in 1980. In January 2000, the two main campuses were merged under the shared name Carlos Albizu University in honor of their founder.

== Campuses ==
Albizu University has its main campus in San Juan, Puerto Rico; a branch campus in Miami, Florida; and an extension of the San Juan Campus in Mayagüez, Puerto Rico.

Each campus includes a clinic that offers mental health and speech and language services to the surrounding community while providing a practical training site for students.

=== San Juan Campus ===
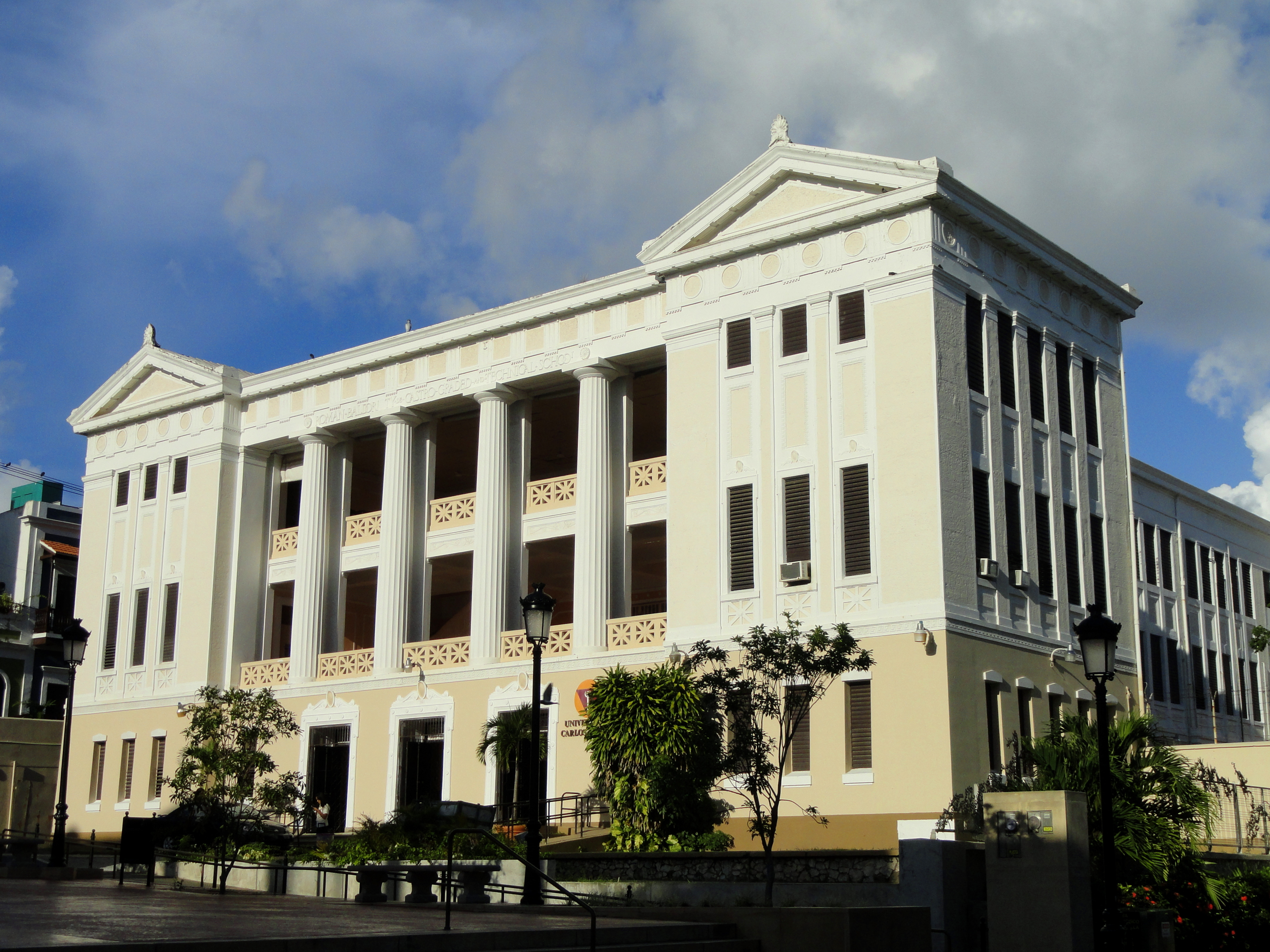
Albizu University, San Juan Campus

Located in the heart of Puerto Rico's capital city, the San Juan Campus set a precedent as the first independent professional school of psychology in North America. Originally called the Puerto Rico Institute of Psychology, Albizu-Miranda modeled the university after institutes of psychology in Europe where practice and internship coexisted. Now, over 50 years since its founding, the San Juan Campus has over 1,600 students and has expanded to include an on-campus training clinic.

==== Student body ====
At the San Juan Campus, enrolled students for Fall 2019 included 483 undergraduates and 1,145 in graduate programs and postgraduate certificate programs. 93% of the students are from Puerto Rico and 7% are from other parts of the United States and its territories.

==== Albizu Clinic ====
The Albizu Clinic, a nonprofit organization affiliated with the university, provides mental health services to children, adolescents, and adults in San Juan and surrounding communities. The clinic also serves as a practicum and internship site for Albizu University graduate students. The Albizu Clinic Internship Training Program in Clinical Psychology is exclusively offered to Albizu students in the Psy.D. and Ph.D. in Clinical Psychology programs.

The Albizu Clinic also provides speech and language services for children and adults in the areas of autism, dysphagia, motor-speech disorders, neurological impairments, hearing impairments, cognitive disabilities, and developmental disorders. Graduate students from the university's M.S. in Speech and Language Pathology program work closely with licensed and certified pathologists.

=== Miami Campus ===
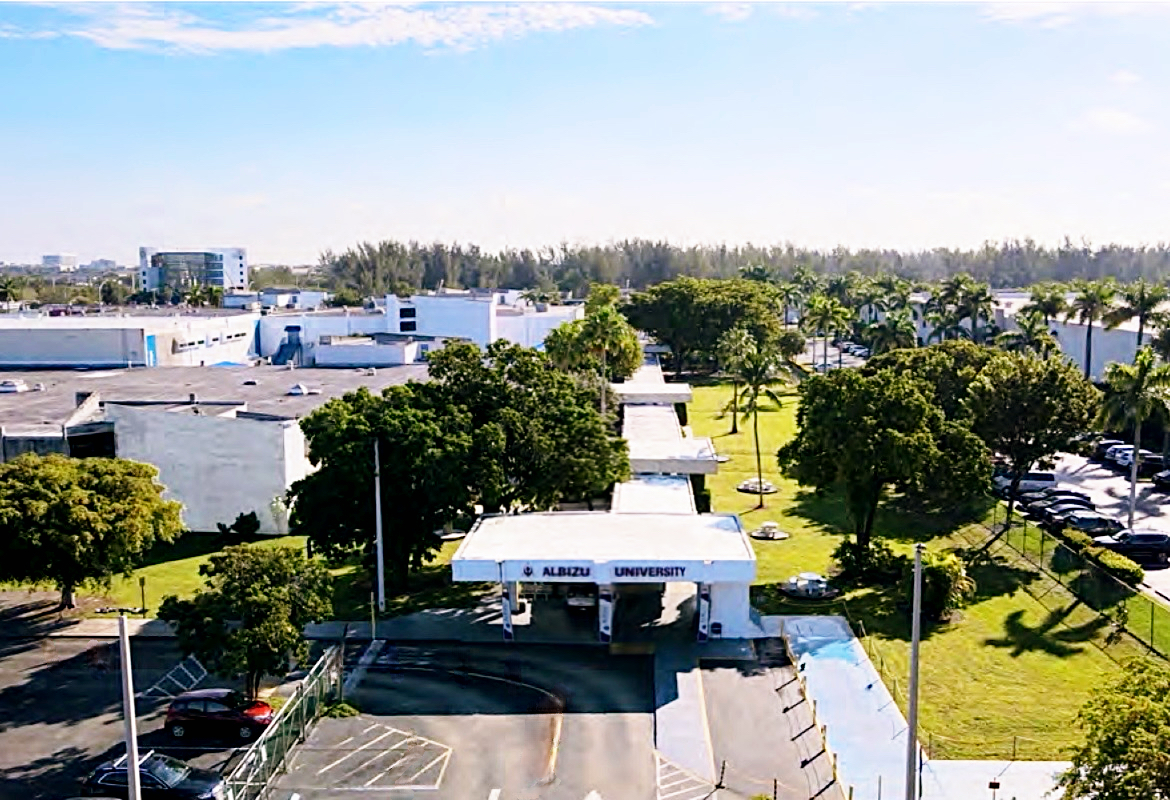
Albizu University’s branch campus in Miami, Florida.

Located in the Miami, Florida, metropolitan area, the Miami Campus offers an array of undergraduate and graduate degree and certificate programs in the fields of psychology, education, speech and language, English for speakers of other languages (ESOL), criminal justice, and human services.

==== Goodman Psychological Services Center ====
Founded in 1980, the Goodman Psychological Services Center is a private, nonprofit mental health center, sponsored by Albizu University, that provides services to children, adolescents, and adults in South Florida. The Goodman Center also functions as a practicum site for Albizu psychology and speech/language programs and for a doctorate in clinical psychology internship program accredited by the American Psychological Association.

Since its inception, the Goodman Center has provided care to nearly 15,000 people from communities that are typically underserved due to factors such as financial hardship, limited or no insurance coverage, and lack of proficiency in the English language. In addition, the Goodman Center is contracted by the Miami-Dade County Public Schools to conduct psychoeducational evaluations and receives referrals from community agencies and other sources. Services are provided in both English and Spanish.

=== Mayagüez University Center ===
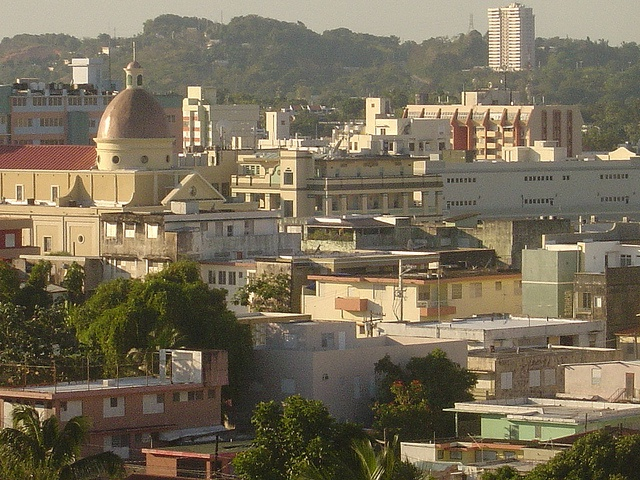
View of Mayagüez Center

In January 2015, Albizu opened an extension location in Mayagüez, Puerto Rico. Under the jurisdiction of the San Juan Campus, the location was created to provide academic offerings and clinical services to the western region of Puerto Rico. Known as the Mayagüez University Center, the facility offers undergraduate, graduate, and certificate programs in psychology and speech and language pathology. With an on-site clinic, the center also offers students clinical practice while providing health services to the community.

The Mayagüez University Center is located in the city of Mayagüez.

==== Student body ====
At the Mayagüez University Center, enrolled students for Fall 2019 included 80 undergraduates and 359 in graduate programs and postgraduate certificate programs. 95% of the students are from Puerto Rico, and 5% are from other parts of the United States and its territories.

==== Albizu Clinic ====
The Albizu Clinic at the Mayagüez University Center provides mental health and speech and language services to children, adolescents, and adults in the surrounding community. The clinic also serves as a practicum and internship site for Albizu graduate students.
