= Joseph W. Buckwalter =

American politician (1850–1911)

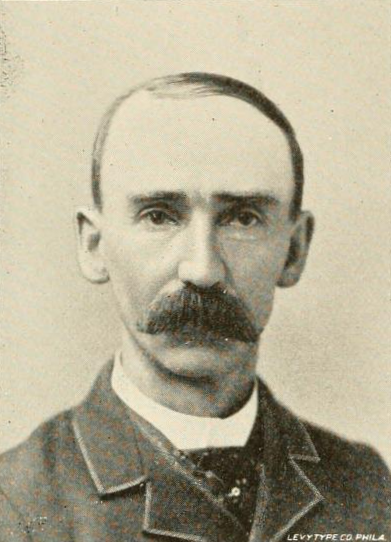
- Buckwalter in a 1895 publication

Member of the Pennsylvania House of Representatives from the Perry County district
- In office 1893–1896

Personal details
- Born: Joseph Warren Buckwalter; February 22, 1850 Wallace Township, Pennsylvania, U.S.
- Died: May 3, 1911 (aged 61) Miller Township, Perry County, Pennsylvania, U.S.
- Resting place: Newport Cemetery; Newport, Pennsylvania, U.S.
- Party: Republican
- Spouse: Kate Boyer
- Children: 5
- Occupation: Politician; educator; merchant; farmer

Joseph Warren Buckwalter (February 22, 1850 – May 3, 1911) was an American politician from Pennsylvania. He served as a member of the Pennsylvania House of Representatives, representing Perry County from 1893 to 1896.

== Early life ==
Joseph Warren Buckwalter was born on February 22, 1850, in Wallace Township, Pennsylvania, to Henry A. Buckwalter. In 1852, his family moved to Juniata Township, Perry County, Pennsylvania. He attended common schools and Mt. Dempsey Academy, New Bloomfield Academy and Landisburg Academy.

== Career ==
Buckwalter was a teacher for five years in the winter and farmed in the summers. He worked in mercantile business for six years and had a general store in Newport. He also worked as a commercial salesman and supervised a farm he owned in Miller Township.

Buckwalter was a Republican. He was secretary of the school board in his township. He was a census enumerator for two districts in Perry County. He was a member of the Perry County Republican Committee. He served as a member of the Pennsylvania House of Representatives, representing Perry County from 1893 to 1896. He later worked as a farmer.

== Personal life ==
Buckwalter married Kate Boyer of Newport. They had three sons and two daughters.

Buckwalter died on May 3, 1911, at his home in Miller Township, near Logania. He was interred at Newport Cemetery in Newport.
