= Debbie Senesky =

Assistant professor of Aeronautics

Debbie G. Senesky
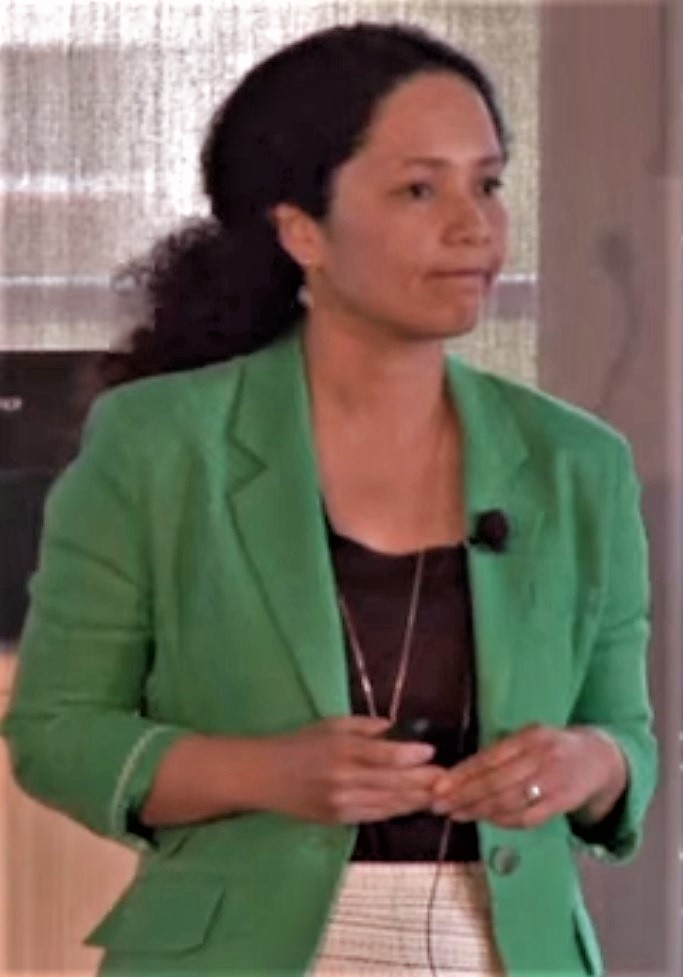
- Debbie Senesky speaks at Stanford in 2015
- Education: University of Southern California; University of California, Berkeley
- Scientific career
- Workplaces: Stanford University

Debbie Senesky is an associate professor of Aeronautics at Stanford University. She is the principal investigator of the EXtreme Environment Microsystems Laboratory, and studies nanomaterials in extreme environments.

== Early life and education ==
Senesky was interested in maths as a child. She studied mechanical engineering at the University of Southern California and was the first member of her family to go to college. During her undergraduate degree she worked in a cleanroom. She moved to the University of California, Berkeley for her doctoral studies, earning a Master's in 2004 and a PhD in 2007. Her PhD looked at heat resistant materials and was supported by an Alfred P. Sloan Foundation fellowship. After her doctorate, Senesky worked at GE Sensing and Hewlett-Packard.

== Career ==
Senesky is an aerospace engineer who works on nanoscale sensors that can work in extreme conditions. She was appointed to the aeronautics department at Stanford University in 2012. She was awarded an Early Career Faculty Space Tech Research Grant from NASA in 2012. Since 2014 she has led the EXtreme Environment Microsystems Laboratory (X-Lab) at Stanford University. In 2015 she designed a soot-particulate sensor with Stephen Luby. The sensor was made from Gallium nitride, sapphire and metal–semiconductor interfaces. She was selected as a speaker for the Stanford University Rising Stars conference in 2017. She edited the 2014 SPIE volume Sensors for Extreme Harsh Environments.

=== Women in science activities ===
Senesky is involved with a number of initiatives to improve diversity in science. She serves on the board of the nonprofit Scientific Adventures for Girls. She delivered a keynote at the Introduce a Girl to Engineering celebration at Agilent Technologies. In 2018 she chaired the Women in Aerospace Symposium at Stanford University. She appeared on the podcast People Behind the Science. She is a member of the NASA space technology mission directorate.

=== Awards and honours ===
- 2018 AnitaB.org Emerging Leader Abie Award in Honor of Denice Denton
- 2016 National Academy of Engineering Selected Participant, US Frontiers of Engineering Symposium
- 2015 IEEE Electron Devices Society Golden Reviewer
- 2012 NASA Early Faculty Career Award
- 2012 Stanford University Frederick E. Terman Faculty Fellow
- 2012 Stanford University Gabilan Faculty Fellow
- 2004 Sloan Foundation Ph.D. Fellowship
