= Ron Kopito =

American professor of biology

Ron Rieger Kopito
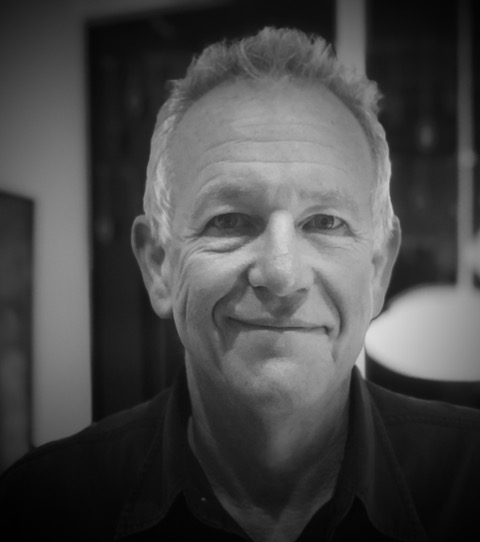
- Born: 1954 (age 71–72); Haifa, Israel
- Occupations: Cell biologist and academic

Academic background
- Education: Bowdoin College (AB); Massachusetts Institute of Technology (PhD)

Academic work
- Discipline: Cell biology
- Institutions: Stanford University

Ron Rieger Kopito (born 1954) is an American cell biologist and academic holding the position of Professor in the Department of Biology at Stanford University. He is most known for his work on proteostasis, particularly the role of ubiquitin and UFMylation in protein and ribosome quality control in the mammalian secretory pathway. Kopito is a Lifetime Fellow of the American Society for Cell Biology.

== Education ==
Kopito earned an A.B. in biochemistry from Bowdoin College in 1976. He then received his Ph.D. in nutritional biochemistry and metabolism from the Massachusetts Institute of Technology (MIT) in 1982.

== Career ==
Kopito was an NIH postdoctoral fellow and Lucille P. Markey Scholar at MIT and the Whitehead Institute from 1982 to 1986 under the mentorship of Harvey F. Lodish. In 1987, he joined the faculty of the Department of Biological Sciences (now the Department of Biology) at Stanford University, and became a full professor in 1996.

His research work has included genetics, cell physiological characterization of SLC4A anion transporters and the cystic fibrosis transmembrane conductance regulator, CFTR, defining the role of the ubiquitin proteasome system (UPS) in endoplasmic reticulum (ER) associated degradation (ERAD). He coined the term aggresome to describe intracellular inclusions that collect aggregated proteins and demonstrated that protein aggregates derived from the Huntington's disease gene product impair cellular proteostasis and can propagate between cells in a prion-like manner. He discovered that UFMylation of the large ribosomal subunit is required for ribosome-associated quality control and translocon recycling at the ER, resolving a 50-year-old cell biological mystery.

== Awards and honors ==
- 1985 – Lucille P. Markey Scholar Award, Massachusetts Institute of Technology
- 1989 – Presidential Young Investigator Award, National Science Foundation
- 1993 – Established Investigator Award, American Heart Association
- 2018 – Lifetime Fellow, American Society for Cell Biology

== Bibliography ==
- Kopito, Ron; Lodish, Harvey (1985). "Primary structure and transmembrane orientation of the murine anion exchange protein". Nature. 316 (6025): 234–238. Bibcode:1985Natur.316..234K. doi:10.1038/316234a0. PMID 2410791.
- Kopito, Ron R.; Lee, Beth S.; Simmons, Donna M.; Lindsey, Ann E.; Morgans, Catherine W.; Schneider, Karin (1989). "Regulation of intracellular pH by a neuronal homolog of the erythrocyte anion exchanger". Cell. 59 (5): 927–937. doi:10.1016/0092-8674(89)90615-6. PMID 2686841.
- Gunderson, Kevin L.; Kopito, Ron R. (1995). "Conformational states of CFTR associated with channel gating: The role of ATP binding and hydrolysis". Cell. 82 (2): 231–239. doi:10.1016/0092-8674(95)90310-0. PMID 7543023.
- Ward, Cristina L.; Omura, Satoshi; Kopito, Ron R. (1995). "Degradation of CFTR by the ubiquitin-proteasome pathway". Cell. 83 (1): 121–127. doi:10.1016/0092-8674(95)90240-6. PMID 7553863.
- Bennett, Eric J.; Shaler, Thomas A.; Woodman, Ben; Ryu, Kwon-Yul; Zaitseva, Tatiana S.; Becker, Christopher H.; Bates, Gillian P.; Schulman, Howard; Kopito, Ron R. (2007). "Global changes to the ubiquitin system in Huntington's disease". Nature. 448 (7154): 704–708. Bibcode:2007Natur.448..704B. doi:10.1038/nature06022. PMID 17687326.
- Pearce, Margaret M. P.; Spartz, Ellen J.; Hong, Weizhe; Luo, Liqun; Kopito, Ron R. (2015). "Prion-like transmission of neuronal huntingtin aggregates to phagocytic glia in the Drosophila brain". Nature Communications. 6: 6768. Bibcode:2015NatCo...6.6768P. doi:10.1038/ncomms7768. PMC 4515032. PMID 25866135.
- Scavone, Francesco; Gumbin, Samantha C.; Da Rosa, Paul A.; Kopito, Ron R. (2023). "RPL26/uL24 UFMylation is essential for ribosome-associated quality control at the endoplasmic reticulum". Proceedings of the National Academy of Sciences of the United States of America. 120 (16) e2220340120. Bibcode:2023PNAS..12020340S. doi:10.1073/pnas.2220340120. PMC 10120006. PMID 37036982.
