= Hispanic Journal of Behavioral Sciences =

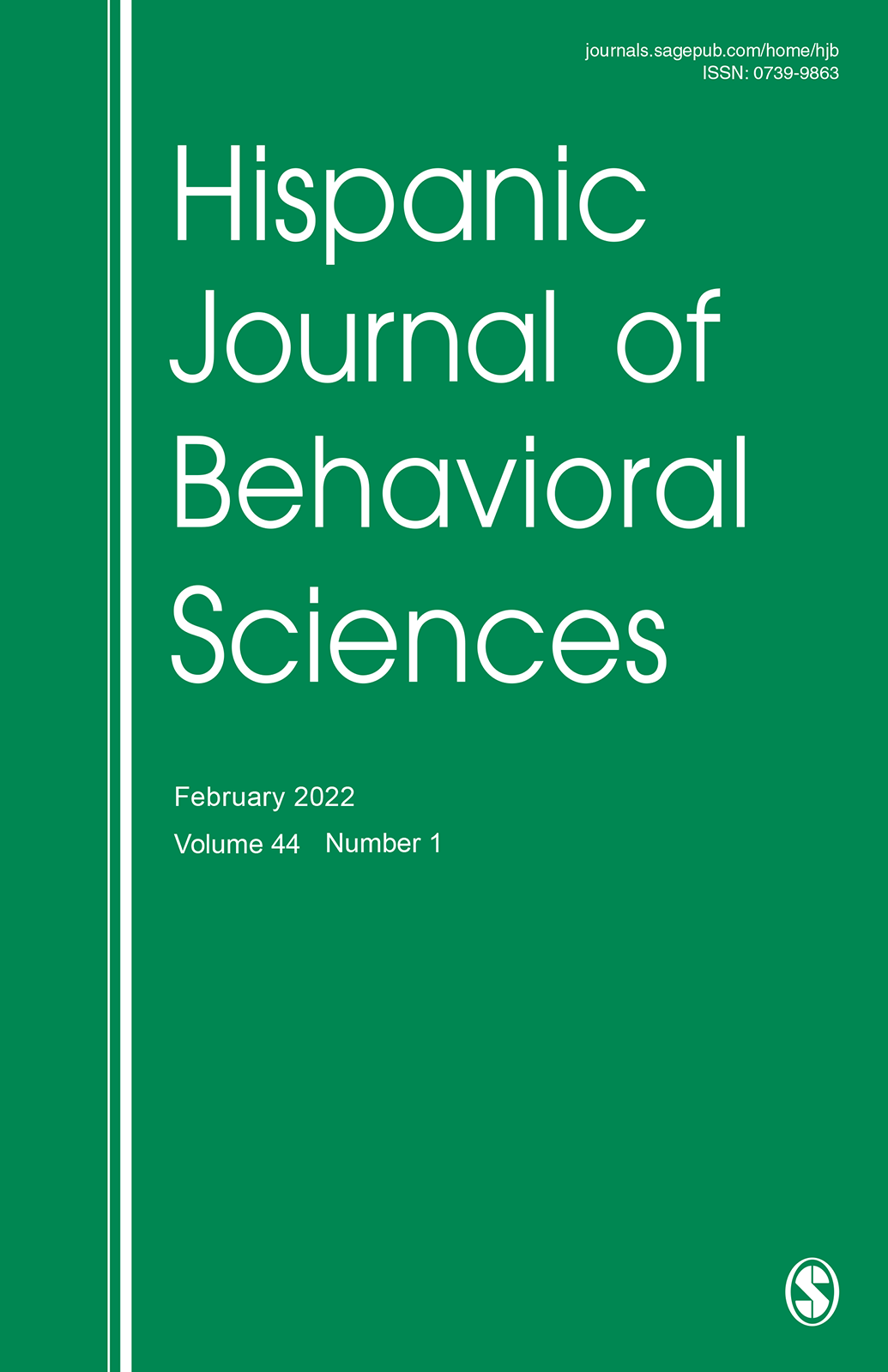
- Discipline: Psychology
- Language: English
- Edited by: Amado M. Padilla

Publication details
- History: 1979–present
- Publisher: SAGE Publications
- Frequency: Quarterly
- Impact factor: 0.864 (2017)

Standard abbreviations
- ISO 4: Hisp. J. Behav. Sci.

Indexing
- CODEN: HJBSEZ
- ISSN: 0739-9863 (print); 1552-6364 (web)
- LCCN: 2007209782
- OCLC no.: 5062173

Links
- Journal homepage; Online access; Online archive

Hispanic Journal of Behavioral Sciences is a peer-reviewed academic journal. The journal's editor is Amado M. Padilla (Stanford University). It has been in publication since 1979 and is currently published by SAGE Publications.

== Abstracting and indexing ==
Hispanic Journal of Behavioral Sciences is abstracted and indexed in, among other databases: SCOPUS, and the Social Sciences Citation Index. According to the Journal Citation Reports, its 2017 impact factor is 0.864, ranking it 95 out of 135 journals in the category ‘Psychology, Multidisciplinary’.
