= Amado M. Padilla =

American academic

- Born: October 19, 1942 (age 83)
- Occupation: Professor of Psychology
- Spouse: Kathryn Lindhom
- Awards: APA Distinguished Contribution through Research Award (1990); APA Lifetime Achievement Award (1996); Vida Jacks Professor of Education (2025)

Academic background
- Education: New Mexico Highlands University; Oklahoma State University; University of New Mexico

Amado M. Padilla (born October 19, 1942) is an educator known for his research on academic resiliency, acculturation and related stress, second language learning and bilingualism. Padilla is Professor of Psychological Studies in Education and Associate Dean at the Stanford Graduate School of Education.

== Biography ==
Padilla was born in Albuquerque, New Mexico on October 19, 1942. He went to New Mexico Highlands University and completed his bachelor's degree in Psychology in 1964. Padilla received his master's degree in Experimental Psychology at Oklahoma State University in 1966. and his Ph.D. in Experimental Psychology at the University of New Mexico in 1969. His dissertation titled "An analysis of incentive and behavioral contrast" was supervised by Frank A. Logan.

Padilla taught at the State University of New York, college at Potsdam from 1969 to 1971 and at the University of California, Santa Barbara from 1971 to 1974. From 1974 to 1988, Padilla was faculty at University of California in Los Angeles. After spending 1986-1987 as a visiting professor at Stanford University, he joined the Stanford faculty as Professor of Psychological Studies in Education in 1988. Padilla is affiliated with Stanford's Center for Latin American Studies.

Padilla is the founding editor of the Hispanic Journal of Behavioral Sciences.

Padilla is known for his work highlighting critical issues that affect the well-being of Hispanics in education and other settings. He is credited with coining the term cultural taxation to describe the increased workload and other "unique burdens that faculty of color and other underrepresented faculty face in carrying out responsibilities" at many universities.

== Awards ==
- Academic Excellence Award from the National Coalition of Hispanic Mental Health and Human Services Organizations (1978)
- Distinguished Scholar Award from the Standing Committee on the Role and Status of Minorities in Education Research and Development, American Education Research Association (1987)
- Distinguished Research Award from the Hispanic Research Issues, Special Interest Group, American Education Research Association (1988)
- Distinguished Contribution through Research Award, Division 45, American Psychological Association (1990)
- Lifetime Achievement Award, Division 45, American Psychological Association (1996)

== Books ==
- Keefe, S. E., & Padilla, A. M. (1987). Chicano ethnicity. University of New Mexico Press.
- Padilla, A. M. (1976). Bilingual schools: Gateways to integration or roads to separation. Spanish Speaking Mental Health Research Center
- Padilla, A. M. (Ed.). (1980). Acculturation: Theory, models, and some new findings (Vol. 39). Westview Press.
- Padilla, A. M. (Ed.). (1994). Hispanic psychology: Critical issues in theory and research. Sage Publications
- Padilla, A. M., Fairchild, H. H., & Valadez, C. M. (Eds.). (1990). Foreign language education: Issues and strategies. Corwin.
- Padilla, A. M., & Ruiz, R. A. (1974). Latino mental health: A review of literature. National Institute of Mental Health.

== Representative publications ==
- Padilla, Amado M. (May 1994). "Research news and Comment: Ethnic Minority Scholars; Research, and Mentoring: Current and Future Issues". Educational Researcher. 23 (4): 24–27. doi:10.3102/0013189X023004024. S2CID 145170528.
- Padilla, Amado M. (November 2006). "Bicultural Social Development". Hispanic Journal of Behavioral Sciences. 28 (4): 467–497. doi:10.1177/0739986306294255. S2CID 146602592.
- Padilla, Amado M.; Fan, Lorraine; Xu, Xiaoqiu; Silva, Duarte (December 2013). "A Mandarin/English two-way immersion program: Language proficiency and academic achievement: A Mandarin/English Two-Way Immersion Program". Foreign Language Annals. 46 (4): 661–679. doi:10.1111/flan.12060.
- Padilla, Amado M.; Gonzalez, Rosemary (January 2001). "Academic Performance of Immigrant and U.S.-Born Mexican Heritage Students: Effects of Schooling in Mexico and Bilingual/English Language Instruction". American Educational Research Journal. 38 (3): 727–742. doi:10.3102/00028312038003727. S2CID 145204726.
- Padilla, Amado M.; Perez, William (February 2003). "Acculturation, Social Identity, and Social Cognition: A New Perspective". Hispanic Journal of Behavioral Sciences. 25 (1): 35–55. doi:10.1177/0739986303251694. S2CID 15875807.
- Padilla, Amado M.; Ruiz, Rene A.; Alvarez, Rodolfo (1975). "Community mental health services for the Spanish-speaking/surnamed population". American Psychologist. 30 (9): 892–905. doi:10.1037/0003-066X.30.9.892. PMID 1180420. ProQuest 614309565.
- Padilla, Amado M.; Wagatsuma, Yuria; Lindholm, Kathryn J. (June 1985). "Acculturation and Personality as Predictors of Stress in Japanese and Japanese-Americans". The Journal of Social Psychology. 125 (3): 295–305. doi:10.1080/00224545.1985.9922890. PMID 4079350.
