= Sanjay Lall =

American electrical engineer

Sanjay Lall from Stanford University was named Fellow of the Institute of Electrical and Electronics Engineers (IEEE) in 2015 for contributions to control of networked systems.
