= Stanford University School of Humanities and Sciences =

School within Stanford University

The Stanford University School of Humanities and Sciences grants the majority of Stanford University's degrees. The School has 27 departments and 20 interdisciplinary degree-granting programs. The School was officially created in 1948, from the merger of the Schools of Biological Sciences, Humanities, Physical Sciences, and Social Sciences. Those schools date from the mid-1920s when the university first organized individual departments into schools.

== Departments ==
The school is divided into three divisions: Humanities and Arts, Natural Sciences, and Social Sciences.

=== Humanities and Arts ===
- Art & Art History—One of the original University departments under the name Drawing (1891), Drawing and Painting (1892-1900), back to Drawing (1901–1907), Graphic Arts (1908–1910), Graphic Art (1911–1913, 1927–1947), then Art and Architecture (1948–1969), Art (1970–?) and finally its current name.
- Classics—Stanford started with separate departments for Latin and Greek but these were merged in 1921
- Drama—Started as Public Speaking in 1927 became Speech and Drama in 1937 and Drama in 1971
- East Asian Languages and Cultures
- English—one of the original departments but under the name English Language and Literature
- History—one of the original departments
- Linguistics—established in 1971
- Music—established in 1936
- Philosophy—established sometime in the 1890s
- Religious Studies—started in 1941 as the department of Religion

Division of Literatures, Cultures, and Languages

- Comparative Literature
- French and Italian—one of the original departments under the name Romance Languages which became Romanic Languages. Became French and Italian in 1963.
- German Studies—one of the original departments under the name Germanic Languages
- Iberian & Latin American Cultures
- Slavic Languages and Literature—established in 1926

=== Natural Sciences ===
- Applied Physics—established in 1969
- Biology
- Chemistry—one of the original departments
- Mathematics—one of the original departments
- Physics—one of the original departments
- Statistics—established in 1936

The current Biology department was formed by merging Botany, Zoology, Entomology, and Physiology to form Biological Sciences. The name of this department was changed to Biology in 2009.

=== Social Sciences ===
- Anthropology
- Communication—established in 1927 as Journalism
- Economics—established in 1892 as Economics and Social Sciences
- Political Science
- Psychology—one of the original departments with Frank Angell serving as its first chair. From 1922 to 1942, Lewis Terman served as its chair. In 2015, it was ranked as #1 in the country among all psychology graduate programs in the United States.
- Science, Technology, and Society—interdisciplinary, with both Bachelor of Arts and Bachelor of Science programs
- Sociology

Stanford was set up with a Political Science department but that was almost immediately renamed Economics and Social Science. The forerunner of the current Political Science department was established in 1918.

Sociology and Anthropology were originally one department established in 1948. They split in 1957. Anthropology itself was split into Anthropological Sciences and Cultural and Social Anthropology from 1999 to 2007 but merged again.

Notable faculty in these departments other than those mentioned above include:

- Albert Bandura (1925–2021), David Starr Jordan Professor Emeritus of Social Science
- Carol Dweck (born 1946), Lewis and Virginia Eaton Professor of Psychology (2004–)
- Phillip Zimbardo (born 1933), professor of psychology (1968-200), known for the Stanford Prison Experiment
- Joseph Greenberg (1915–2001), Ray Lyman Wilbur Professor of Social Science, known for his classification of the Niger–Congo languages

== Core courses ==
At times Stanford has required undergraduate students to take core courses in various subjects in the humanities and sciences. Some of the core courses include

- Western Civilization ("Western Civ') taken by all freshmen—first established in 1935 and continued until the mid-1960s.
- Western Culture (1980–1988)—freshmen took courses in both European and non-European cultures with “a substantial historical dimension” and include works by women and minorities.
- Cultures, Ideas and Values (CIV) (1988–2000)
- Introduction to the Humanities (IHUM) (2000–2012), a core freshman course sequence which consisted of one fall-quarter course followed by a 2-quarter pair of courses during the winter and spring quarters. Fall quarter courses were interdisciplinary while winter-spring focused on a specific disciplinary area.
- Thinking Matters (2012–2016)
- Ways of Thinking / Ways of Doing (2016–present)

== List of deans ==
- Clarence H. Faust, English, 1948–1951
- Douglas Merritt Whitaker, Biology, 1951–1952
- Ray N. Faulkner, Art and Architecture, 1952–1956
- Philip H. Rhinelander, Philosophy, 1956–1961
- Robert Richardson Sears, Psychology, 1961–1970
- Albert H. Hastorf III, Psychology, 1970–1973
- Halsey L. Royden, Mathematics, 1973–1981
- Norman K. Wessells, Biology, 1981–1988
- Ewart A.C. Thomas, Psychology, 1988–1993
- John B. Shoven, Economics, 1993–1998
- Malcolm R. Beasley, Applied Physics, 1998–2001
- Sharon R. Long, Biological Sciences, 2001–2007
- Richard Saller, Classics and History, 2007–2018
- Debra Satz, Philosophy, 2018–present
