= Heidi M. Feldman =

American pediatrician

- Born
- Occupations: Developmental-behavioral pediatrician, author and academic

Academic background
- Education: BA psychology, PhD developmental psychology, MD
- Alma mater: University of Pennsylvania; University of California, San Diego

Heidi M. Feldman is an American developmental-behavioral pediatrician, author, and academic. She is the Ballinger-Swindells Endowed Professor of Developmental and Behavioral Pediatrics in the Department of Pediatrics at Stanford University and is the Service Chief of Developmental-Behavioral Pediatrics at Stanford Medicine Children's Health.

Feldman's publications include journal articles and books, including The Parent's Guide to Speech and Language Problems, Redesigning Health Care for Children with Disabilities, and Developmental-Behavioral Pediatrics.

Feldman is a member of the 2020 inaugural cohort of the National Academy of Distinguished Educators in Pediatrics.

== Education and career ==
Feldman earned her BA degree from the University of Pennsylvania, majoring in psychology, in 1970. She spent a gap year in Panama, working as a research assistant at the Smithsonian Tropical Research Institute. She then returned to the University of Pennsylvania to complete a PhD in developmental psychology in 1975. In 1979, she received an MD from the University of California, San Diego School of Medicine, where she also completed her internship and residency, followed by fellowship training in developmental-behavioral pediatrics at Boston Children's Hospital in 1984.

In 1984, Feldman joined the faculty of the University of Pittsburgh School of Medicine and the Children's Hospital of Pittsburgh. She moved to Stanford University School of Medicine and Lucile Packard Children's Hospital in 2006.

Feldman has been the president of the Society of Developmental-Behavioral Pediatrics.

== Research ==
Feldman has studied the development and resilience of language in children with atypical experiences or neurodevelopmental risks, including those who are deaf and blind, have early brain injury, experience chronic otitis media, are born preterm, or have developmental-behavioral conditions.

Feldman examined how children develop communication in the absence of language models through a longitudinal observation study that evaluated deaf children of hearing parents who were not exposed to sign language or verbal language. The results showed that the children created a manual-gestural system called "home sign," a structured system that included many features of spoken language.

Feldman investigated how properties of white matter in the brain relate to language and reading outcomes in children born preterm. Her research addressed the elevated risk of neurodevelopmental disorders, including impairments in language, cognition, and reading, among children born very or extremely preterm. Using diffusion MRI (dMRI) to characterize white matter, she conducted observational studies that combined neuroimaging and behavioral assessments to explore whether disruptions in white matter might underlie these outcomes. Her findings showed that children born preterm exhibited specific difficulties in linguistic processing speed, verbal memory, and reading comprehension, with group differences in white matter microstructure remaining stable across childhood.

== Awards and honors ==
- 2012 – C. Anderson Aldrich Award, American Academy of Pediatrics
- 2016 – Clinical Research Award of Excellence, Stanford University
- 2020 – Inaugural Fellow, National Academy of Distinguished Educators in Pediatrics

== Bibliography ==
=== Books ===
- The Parent's Guide to Speech and Language Problems. 2007. ISBN 978-0-07-148245-5.
- Redesigning Health Care for Children with Disabilities: Strengthening Inclusion, Contribution, and Health. 2013. ISBN 978-1-59857-234-6.
- Developmental-Behavioral Pediatrics, Fifth Edition. 2022. ISBN 978-0-323-80972-6.

=== Selected articles ===
- Committee on Quality Improvement; Subcommittee on Attention-Deficit/Hyperactivity Disorder (2000). "Clinical practice guideline: diagnosis and evaluation of the child with attention-deficit/hyperactivity disorder". Pediatrics. 105 (5): 1158–1170. doi:10.1542/peds.105.5.1158. PMID 10836893.
- Subcommittee on Attention-Deficit/Hyperactivity Disorder; Committee on Quality Improvement (2001). "Clinical practice guideline: treatment of the school-aged child with attention-deficit/hyperactivity disorder". Pediatrics. 108 (4): 1033–1044. doi:10.1542/peds.108.4.1033. PMID 11581465.
- Loe, I. M.; Feldman, Heidi M. (2007). "Academic and educational outcomes of children with ADHD". Journal of Pediatric Psychology. 32 (6): 643–654. doi:10.1093/jpepsy/jsl054. PMID 17569716.
- Subcommittee on Attention-Deficit/Hyperactivity Disorder; Steering Committee on Quality Improvement and Management (2011). "ADHD: clinical practice guideline for the diagnosis, evaluation, and treatment of attention-deficit/hyperactivity disorder in children and adolescents". Pediatrics. 128 (5): 1007–1022. doi:10.1542/peds.2011-2654. PMC 4500647. PMID 22003063.
- Yeatman, J. D.; Dougherty, R. F.; Myall, N. J.; Wandell, B. A.; Feldman, Heidi M. (2012). "Tract profiles of white matter properties: automating fiber-tract quantification". PLOS ONE. 7 (11) e49790. Bibcode:2012PLoSO...749790Y. doi:10.1371/journal.pone.0049790. PMC 3498174. PMID 23166771.
- Lin, I. Y.; Morgan, A. C.; Stave, C. D.; Feldman, Heidi M.; Huffman, L. C. (2025). "Family Navigation for Children with Autism: A Scoping Review of Quantitative and Qualitative Evidence". Journal of Autism and Developmental Disorders: 1–23. doi:10.1007/s10803-025-06798-9. PMID 40100561.
