= Lowell Gallagher =

American literary theorist

Lowell Gallagher is an American literary theorist and professor of English at UCLA. He specializes in early modern English literature, particularly early modern English Catholicism and Edmund Spenser. He was an author and an editor for the following works: The text of casuistry in the Renaissance - Volume 1 (1989), The text of casuistry in the Renaissance - Volume 2 (1989), Sodomscapes: Hospitality in the Flesh (Fordham UP, 2017), Medusaś Gaze: Casuistry and Conscience in the Renaissance (Stanford UP, 1991), Catholic Figures, Queer Narratives (Palgrave Macmillan, 2007, co-edited with Frederick S. Roden and Patricia Juliana Smith), Knowing Shakespeare: Senses, Embodiment and Cognition (Palgrave Macmillan, 2010, co-edited with Shankar Raman) Redrawing the Map of Early Modern English Catholicism (University of Toronto Press, 2012), and Entertaining the Idea: Shakespeare, Philosophy, and Performance (University of Toronto Press, 2021, co-edited with James Kearney, and Julia Reinhard Lupton).

Gallagher received his Ph.D. from Stanford University in 1989.
