= John Shoven =

American economist

John B. Shoven

Academic background
- Doctoral advisor: Herbert Scarf

John B. Shoven (born May 24, 1947) is the former Trione Director of the Stanford Institute for Economic Policy Research, the Charles R. Schwab Professor of Economics at Stanford University, the Buzz and Barbara McCoy Senior Fellow at the Hoover Institution and a research associate of the National Bureau of Economic Research. He specializes in public finance and corporate finance and has published on social security, corporate and personal taxation, mutual funds, pension plans and applied general equilibrium economics.

Shoven was born in 1947. Shoven has been at Stanford since 1973, serving as chairman of the economics department from 1986 to 1989, director of the Stanford Institute for Economic Policy Research (SIEPR) [formerly Center for Economic Policy Research] from 1989 to 1993 and 1999 to 2015, and dean of the School of Humanities and Sciences from 1993 to 1998. Shoven served as a consultant for the U.S. Treasury Department from 1975 to 1988. The author of more than one hundred professional articles and eighteen books, notably The Real Deal: The History and Future of Social Security and Putting Our House in Order: A Guide to Social Security and Health Care Reform, he has been a visiting professor at Harvard University, the London School of Economics, Kyoto University, and Monash University. In 1995 he was elected a fellow of the American Academy of Arts and Sciences. Shoven is a University of California, San Diego alumnus earning a B.A. in physics from University of California, San Diego and a Ph.D. in economics from Yale University.

At Stanford, Shoven served as the dean of the School of Humanities and Sciences from 1993 to 1998.

== Bibliography ==
- John B. Shoven; George P. Shultz (2008). Putting Our House in Order: A Guide to Social Security and Health Care Reform. W. W. Norton. ISBN 978-0-393-06961-7.
- Charles L. Ballard; Don Fullerton; John B. Shoven; John Whalley (2009). A General Equilibrium Model for Tax Policy Evaluation. University of Chicago Press. ISBN 9780226036328.
- John B. Shoven, ed. (2011). Demography and the Economy. University of Chicago Press. ISBN 978-0-226-75472-7.
