= Marion Buckwalter =

American neurologist

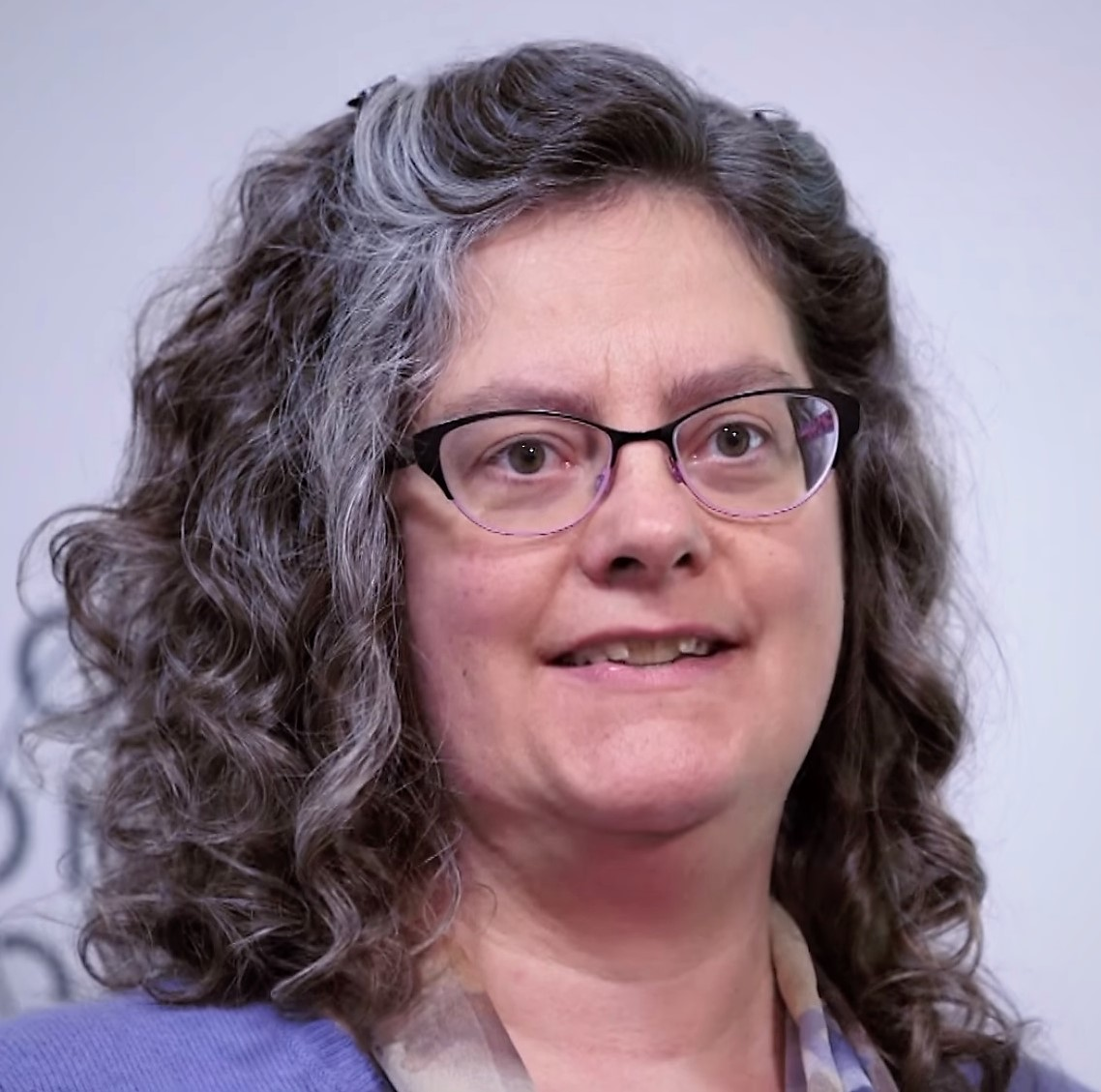
- Buckwalter in 2015
- Education: University of Chicago; University of Michigan; University of California San Francisco
- Known for: Neuroimmune response to stroke
- Awards: George R. DeMuth Medical Scientist Award for Excellence, American Academy of Neurology Annual Meeting Scholarship
- Scientific career
- Fields: Neuroimmunology, neurology
- Workplaces: Stanford University School of Medicine

Marion Buckwalter is an American neurologist and neuroscientist and Professor of Neurology and Neurosurgery at the Stanford University School of Medicine. Buckwalter studies how inflammatory responses affect brain recovery after injury or insult, with a specific emphasis on the neuroimmune and glial cell response after stroke.

== Early life and education ==
In 1984, Buckwalter pursued her undergraduate degree in biological chemistry at the University of Chicago, in Illinois. She completed her Bachelors of Science in 1988 and then pursued her MD/PhD training at the University of Michigan in Ann Arbor in the Department of Human Genetics. Under the mentorship of Sally Camper, Buckwalter helped to localize specific disease causing mutations to mouse chromosomes. She completed her dual degree training in 1996, and then pursued further clinical training at the University of California, San Francisco. Buckwalter completed her Internship in Medicine and Residency in Neurology at the UCSF Medical Center, becoming a Board Certified in Neurology and Psychiatry in 2001. Buckwalter then conducted her Fellowship training in Neurological Critical Care at UCSF, completing her training in 2002.

From 2002 to 2004, Buckwalter conducted her postdoctoral fellowship in Neurology and Neurological Sciences at Stanford University School of Medicine. Under the mentorship of Tony Wyss-Coray, Buckwalter explored the impacts of brain inflammation and neuroimmune signalling in brain disease.

=== Localization and identification of mouse mutations ===
During her Ph.D. at the University of Michigan, Buckwalter localized various genes in the mouse genome. She first identified the location of Ames dwarf (df) mutation on mouse chromosome 11 via an intersubspecific backcross. Buckwalter and her colleagues then mapped, for the first time, the location of the Gabrg-2 subunit of the GABA receptor as well as interferon regulatory factor 1 on mouse chromosome 11. Following this, Buckwalter mapped the candidate genes of the spasmodic recessive mutation to mouse chromosome 11 and evaluated the candidate mutated genes leading to the behavioral abnormalities associated with the mutation such as fine motor tremors, leg clasping, and stiffness. She found, through recombination analyses, that the spasmodic mutation maps to the Glra1 gene, coding for a glycine receptor subunit, and this point mutation decreases the glycine receptor function.

=== Effects of transforming growth factor signalling in the central nervous system ===
Much of Buckwalter's postdoctoral research focused on exploring the effects of transforming growth factor beta (TGFb) signalling in the brain. Human data showing increases in TGFb mRNA correlating with the degree of cerebrovascular amyloid deposition in the brain prompted Buckwalter to explore how TGFb might be implicated in cerebrovascular pathology in disease. She found that overexpression of TGFb in astrocytes lead to Alzheimer's Disease like abnormalities and it led to decreased cerebral blood flow in the limbic system.

Since TGFb is also rapidly increased in aging and after injury, Buckwalter and her colleagues proposed that it may play a role in decreasing hippocampal neurogenesis. They found that over-expression of TGFb in astrocytes almost completely blocked neurogenesis in the hippocampus and it appears to exert its effects at very early stages in neurogenesis, before differentiation into either neurons or astrocytes.

Buckwalter and her colleagues later explored how TGF affects T cell recruitment to the brain meninges and parenchyma in models of Alzheimer's disease. They found that the increased TFGb in addition to increases in amyloid precursor protein led to increased CD4+ T cell infiltration.

== Career and research ==
In 2004, Buckwalter became an instructor in the Department of Neurology and Neurological Sciences at Stanford University. By 2007, she was promoted to Assistant Professor. In 2015, she was promoted to Associate Professor, and in 2020, to full Professor. Buckwalter holds the title of Professor in the Department of Neurology and Neurological Sciences and is a Bio-X Affiliated Faculty. Buckwalter is a leader in stroke research and directs several clinical stroke initiatives at Stanford. She is the deputy director of the Wu Tsai Neurosciences Institute, co-founded and now co-leads the Stroke Collaborative Action Network, and is the co-founder of the Stroke Recovery Program at Stanford.

Buckwalter is also the Principal Investigator of the Buckwalter Lab. Her lab focuses on exploring the neuroimmune landscape after brain insult and injury to guide stroke recovery treatments and therapeutic development. Buckwalter explores how astrocytes regulate inflammation in the brain after stroke, how transforming growth factor beta (TGFb) signalling can limit the immune responses after brain injury and infection, and the central and peripheral effects of stroke on the immune system.

=== Role of TGFb in brain inflammation ===
In her lab at Stanford, Buckwalter has been exploring the pleiotropic nature of TGFb in the brain post-stroke. TGFb appears to be neuroprotective after stroke through orchestrating glial scarring and regulating the local immune landscape in the brain, so Buckwalter and her lab wanted to see how this process changes in age. They found that activated macrophages and microglia were the predominant sources of TGFb after stroke and that astrocytes, macrophages, and microglia all upregulate their TGFb dependent signalling after stroke whereas neurons and oligodendrocytes do not. Moreover, the increases in TGFb signalling increase with age.

Further exploration of the effects of this over-expression highlighted the striking effects that TGFb can have on the neural landscape in the long term. Along with Sheena Josselyn and Paul Frankland, Buckwalter helped to discover that TGFb led to volumetric expansion in the hippocampus which was associated with defects in spatial learning.

In the context of infection, however, TGFb appears to play a critical role in moderating the immune response. Buckwalter and her colleagues showed that upon infection with Toxoplasma gondii, TGFb is critical to preventing over-infiltration of immune cells and actually helps to limit neuronal injury and death. Similarly, after an acute stroke, astrocyte mediated TGFb signalling appeared to limit neuroinflammation and preserve brain function. The acute astrocytic responses to TFGb seem to mediate the brain's anti-inflammatory response to stroke.

=== Small molecule stroke treatment ===
Buckwalter and her colleague Frank Longo developed a small molecule tropomyosin-related kinase B agonist (LM22A-4) and tested its effects on stroke recovery. They found that LM22A-4 promoted neurogenesis when administered 3 days post-stroke and it significantly improved recovery, improving limb speed and accelerating the return to normal gate accuracy.

=== Stroke effects ===
To explore the underlying causes of post-stroke associated dementia, Buckwalter probed the B lymphocyte response to stroke that had been observed. She found that B lymphocytes infiltrate the brain and are found in neuropil and are associated with aberrant LTP and cognitive delays. Further, pharmacologically blocking B lymphocytes prevented cognitive delays after stroke. To look at the possibility of B cell mediated deficits in cognition in humans, Buckwalter and her colleagues measured autoantibodies in patients after stroke and found that increases in autoantibodies to myelin basic protein were associated with cognitive decline after stroke.

== Awards and honors ==
- 1991 March of Dimes Predoctoral Training Fellowship
- 1996 George R. DeMuth Medical Scientist Award for Excellence
- 1999 American Academy of Neurology Annual Meeting Scholarship
- 1999–2000 Chief Residency in Neurology, University of California San Francisco
- 2018 Co-PI American Heart Association-Allen Initiative in Brain Health and Cognitive Impairment

== Select publications ==
- B-Lymphocyte-Mediated Delayed Cognitive Impairment following Stroke. Kristian P. Doyle, Lisa N. Quach, Montse Solé, Robert C. Axtell, Thuy-Vi V. Nguyen, Gilberto J. Soler-Llavina, Sandra Jurado, Jullet Han, Lawrence Steinman, Frank M. Longo, Julie A. Schneider, Robert C. Malenka, and Marion S. Buckwalter. The Journal of Neuroscience, February 4, 2015, 35(5):2133–145; doi:10.1523/JNEUROSCI.
- Ferumoxytol administration does not alter infarct volume or the inflammatory response to stroke in mice. Doyle KP, Quach LN, Arceuil HE, Buckwalter MS. Neurosci Lett. 2015 Jan 1;584:236-40. doi: 10.1016/j.neulet.2014.10.041.
- Astrocytic TGF-β signaling limits inflammation and reduces neuronal damage during central nervous system Toxoplasma infection. Cekanaviciute E, Dietrich HK, Axtell RC, Williams AM, Egusquiza R, Wai KM, Koshy AA, Buckwalter MS. J Immunol. 2014 Jul 1;193(1):139-49. doi: 10.4049/jimmunol.1303284.
- Astrocytic transforming growth factor-beta signaling reduces subacute neuroinflammation after stroke in mice. Cekanaviciute E, Fathali N, Doyle KP, Williams AM, Han J, Buckwalter MS. Glia. 2014 Aug;62(8):1227–40. doi: 10.1002/glia.22675.
- Delayed administration of a small molecule tropomyosin-related kinase B ligand promotes recovery after hypoxic-ischemic stroke. Han J, Pollak J, Yang T, Siddiqui MR, Doyle KP, Taravosh-Lahn K, Cekanaviciute E, Han A, Goodman JZ, Jones B, Jing D, Massa SM, Longo FM, Buckwalter MS. Stroke. 2012; 43 (7): 1918–24
- The double-edged sword of inflammation after stroke: what sharpens each edge? Doyle KP, Buckwalter MS. Ann Neurol. 2012; 71 (6): 729–31
- TGFβ signaling in the brain increases with aging and signals to astrocytes and innate immune cells in the weeks after stroke. Doyle KP, Cekanaviciute E, Mamer LE, Buckwalter MS. J Neuroinflammation. 2010: 7 62
- Glia-dependent TGF-beta signaling, acting independently of the TH17 pathway, is critical for initiation of murine autoimmune encephalomyelitis. Luo J, Ho PP, Buckwalter MS, Hsu T, Lee LY, Zhang H, Kim DK, Kim SJ, Gambhir SS, Steinman L, Wyss-Coray T. J Clin Invest. 2007; 117 (11): 3306–15
- Increased T cell recruitment to the CNS after amyloid beta 1–42 immunization in Alzheimer's mice overproducing transforming growth factor-beta 1. Buckwalter MS, Coleman BS, Buttini M, Barbour R, Schenk D, Games D, Seubert P, Wyss-Coray T. J Neurosci. 2006; 26 (44): 11437-41
- A frameshift mutation in the mouse alpha 1 glycine receptor gene (Glra1) results in progressive neurological symptoms and juvenile death. Buckwalter MS, Cook SA, Davisson MT, White WF, Camper SA. Hum Mol Genet. 1994; 3 (11): 2025–30
- Localization of the human chromosome 5q genes Gabra-1, Gabrg-2, Il-4, Il-5, and Irf-1 on mouse chromosome 11. Buckwalter MS, Lossie AC, Scarlett LM, Camper SA. Mamm Genome. 1992; 3 (10): 604–7
