= Robert K. Jaedicke =

American academic administrator and professor (1929–2020)

- Born: February 10, 1929
- Died: May 24, 2020 (aged 91)
- Education: University of Washington; University of Minnesota
- Occupation: Academic
- Employer: Stanford Graduate School of Business

Robert K. Jaedicke (February 10, 1929 – May 24, 2020) was an American academic. He was the dean of the Stanford Graduate School of Business from 1983 to 1990. He was the Philip H. Knight Professor of Accounting at GSB. "Robert K. Jaedicke". Stanford Graduate School of Business. He is also known for being the chair of audit committee for Enron since the company's founding.
