= Miller Township, Perry County, Pennsylvania =

Township in Pennsylvania, US

Coordinates: 40°28′00″N 77°03′59″W

- Township
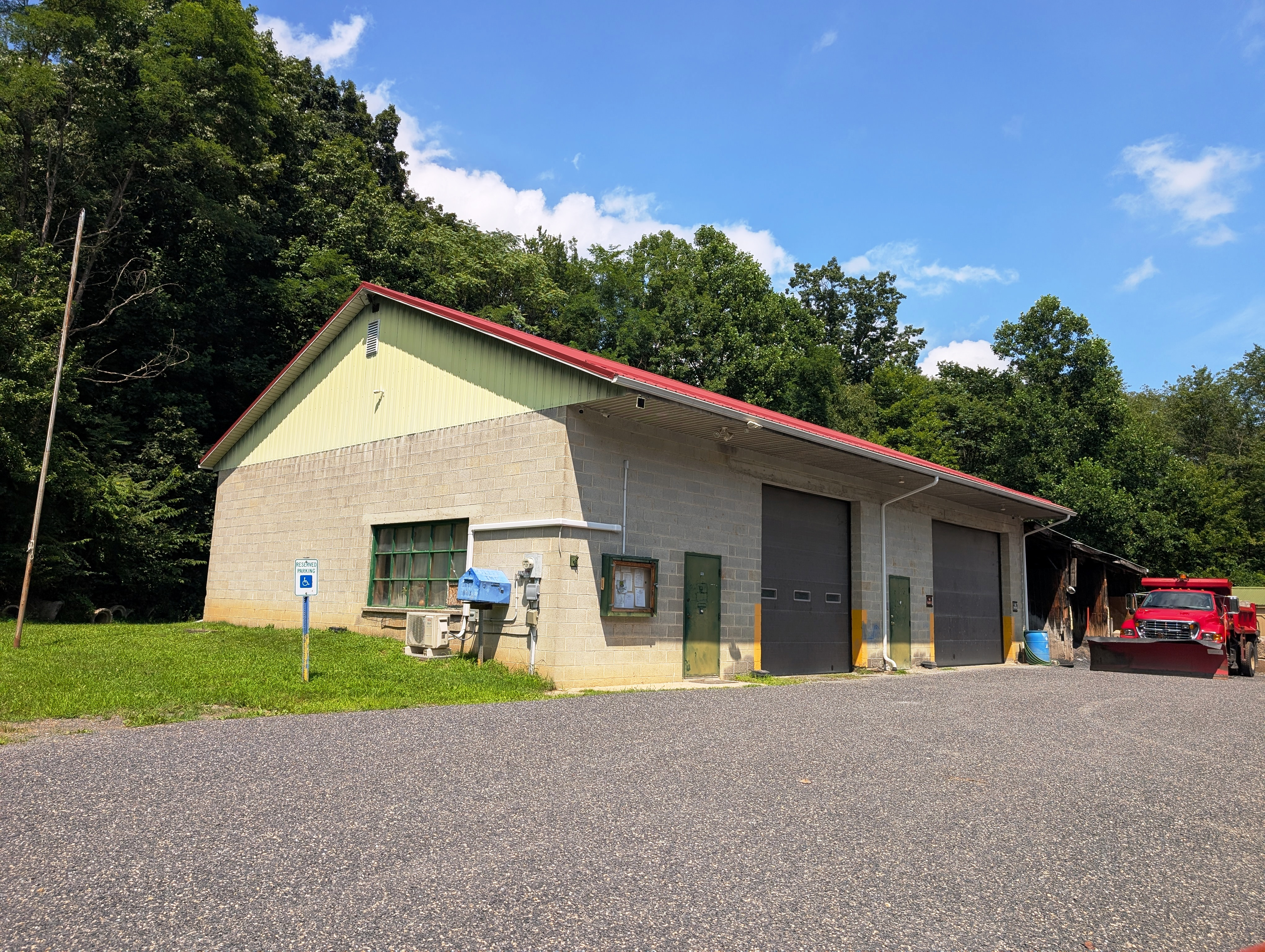
- Municipal Building

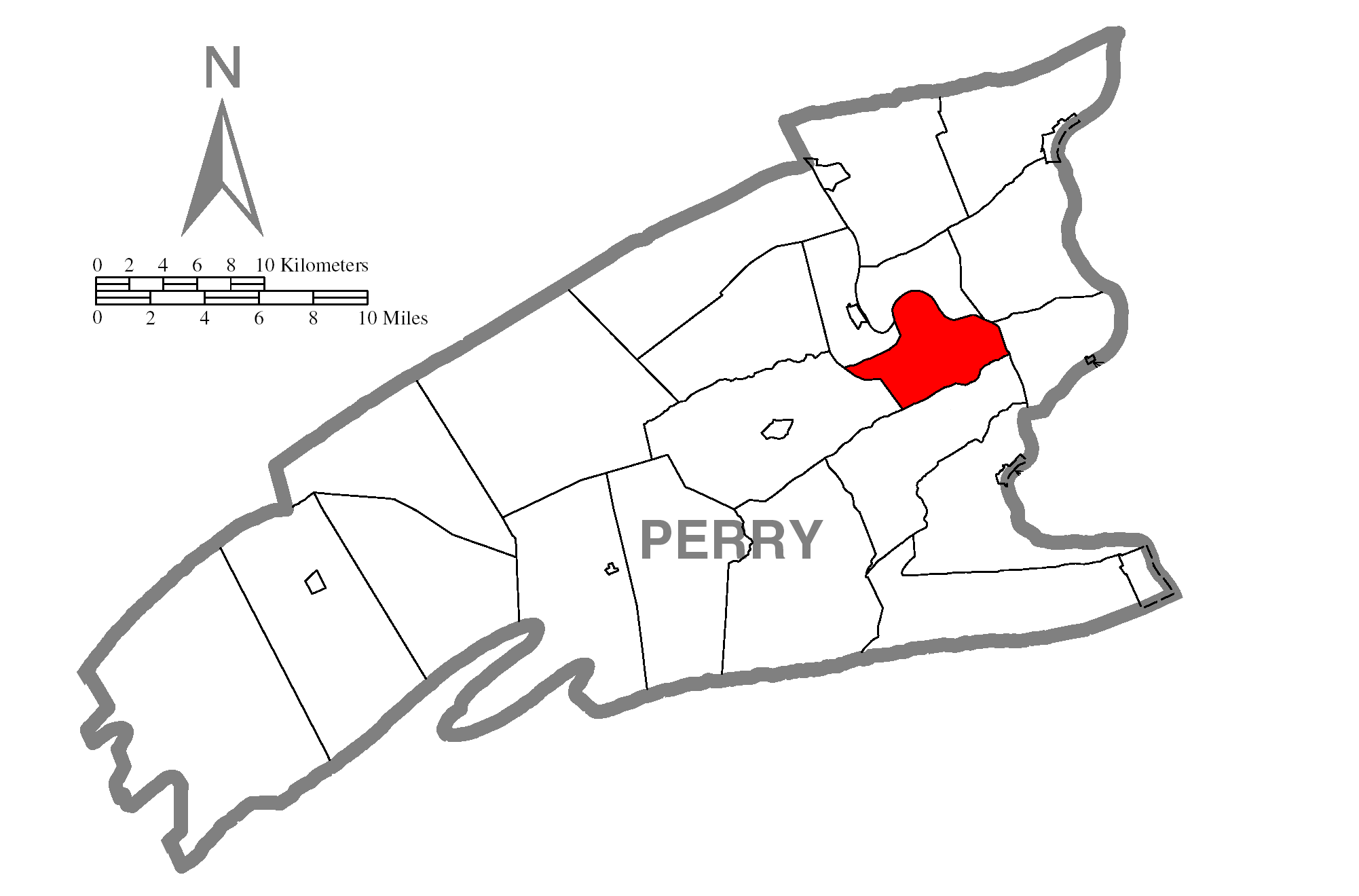
- Map of Perry County, Pennsylvania highlighting Miller Township

- Map of Perry County, Pennsylvania
- Country: United States
- State: Pennsylvania
- County: Perry
- Settled: 1767
- Incorporated: 1852

Area
  - Total: 12.85 sq mi (33.29 km^{2})
  - Land: 12.46 sq mi (32.27 km^{2})
  - Water: 0.39 sq mi (1.02 km^{2})

Population (2020)
  - Total: 965 ▼
  - Estimate (2023): 971
  - Density: 87.1/sq mi (33.63/km^{2})
- Time zone: UTC-5 (Eastern (EST))
  - Summer (DST): UTC-4 (EDT)
- Area code: 717
- FIPS code: 42-099-49632
- Website: https://millertwp.com/

Miller Township is a township in Perry County, Pennsylvania, United States. The population was 965 at the 2020 census.

== Geography ==
According to the United States Census Bureau, the township has a total area of 12.9 square miles (33.3 km^{2}), of which 12.5 square miles (32.4 km^{2}) is land and 0.3 square mile (0.9 km^{2}) (2.65%) is water.

== Demographics ==
Historical population
Census	Pop.	Note	%±
2010	1,098		—
2020	965		−12.1%
2023 (est.)	971		0.6%
U.S. Decennial Census

As of the census of 2000, there were 953 people, 340 households, and 253 families residing in the township. The population density was 76.2 inhabitants per square mile (29.4/km^{2}). There were 425 housing units at an average density of 34.0 per square mile (13.1/km^{2}). The racial makeup of the township was 98.43% White, 0.10% African American, 0.10% Native American, and 1.36% from two or more races. Hispanic or Latino of any race were 1.89% of the population.

There were 340 households, out of which 37.4% had children under the age of 18 living with them, 64.4% were married couples living together, 7.1% had a female householder with no husband present, and 25.3% were non-families. 18.5% of all households were made up of individuals, and 4.7% had someone living alone who was 65 years of age or older. The average household size was 2.80 and the average family size was 3.24.

In the township the population was spread out, with 28.4% under the age of 18, 7.3% from 18 to 24, 32.5% from 25 to 44, 24.4% from 45 to 64, and 7.2% who were 65 years of age or older. The median age was 35 years. For every 100 females, there were 94.5 males. For every 100 females age 18 and over, there were 99.4 males.

The median income for a household in the township was $45,167, and the median income for a family was $49,063. Males had a median income of $31,534 versus $25,341 for females. The per capita income for the township was $16,978. About 7.3% of families and 10.1% of the population were below the poverty line, including 13.3% of those under age 18 and 5.2% of those age 65 or over.
