= Philip H. Rhinelander =

Philip H. Rhinelander (January 1, 1908 – March 24, 1987), was an American philosopher, professor, and former dean of the Stanford University School of Humanities and Sciences.

== Biography ==
Rhinelander was born in Cambridge, Massachusetts, on January 1, 1908. He was educated at Harvard, where he obtained the A.B. summa cum laude in Classics and Philosophy in 1929, studying with the philosopher Alfred North Whitehead. Rhinelander then entered the Harvard Law School, attaining the LLB in 1932. The same year, he married his wife of 55 years, Virginia, after which he practiced law for eight years, doing appellate trial work at the Boston law firm of Choate, Hall & Stewart. At the outbreak of World War II, he was called to active duty in the U.S. Naval Reserves where he served on active duty from 1941 to 1945 eventually reaching the rank of Lt. Commander. His experiences during the war had a profound impact that shaped his later teaching interests in philosophy and the humanities, Philosophy of Law, and, in particular, its application in the field of Ethics. After the war, he returned to Harvard to work toward a Ph.D. in philosophy.

In 1949, Rhinelander earned his Ph.D. at Harvard; and he was retained at that institution as a faculty member teaching philosophy and general education. His course, The Problems of Good and Evil, soon became a favorite with his students. In 1952, Harvard made Rhinelander the Director of General Education, and, also, the Chairman of the Committee on General Education.

In 1956, he went to Stanford University to assume the position of dean of School of Humanities and Sciences and as a professor of philosophy and humanities. Rhinelander's deanship coincided with one of the most important periods of the expansion of the Stanford faculty. Additionally, due to the impact of the Vietnam War, this period was also a turbulent time for students and faculty alike. In the 1960s he was active as Chairman of the Committee of Fifteen, dealing with the difficulties of the years of student protest. Always teaching in addition to his administrative duties, he offered courses in the Humanities Special Program and in the Values, Technology, Science and Society Program. This was in addition to those courses which he taught in the Philosophy Department. At various times he served on the executive committee of the Academic Council, the Committee on University Policy, the Committee on Student Affairs, the Committee Undergraduate Education, and the Inter-Fraternity Board. He was also acting director of the Hoover Institute briefly, between the directorships of Rothwell and Campbell in 1959. As Chairman of the Student Conduct Legislative Council, Rhinelander was instrumental in the efforts that strengthened Stanford University's Honor Code.

In 1961, Rhinelander resigned as dean so that he could devote his full attention to teaching. He was, during this time period, one of Stanford's most popular teachers. In 1963, Rhinelander was recognized for his many achievements by receiving Stanford's highest honor for faculty, the Lloyd W. Dinkelspiel Award for distinguished service to undergraduate education. In 1972, he was named Olive H. Palmer Professor Emeritus of Humanities.

In 1974, Rhinelander published the well received book, Is Man Incomprehensible to Man?, in which he covered contemporary philosophical concepts.

One of Rhinelander's former students, retired Vice Admiral James Stockdale, who was a prisoner of war in Vietnam, credited Rhinelander's courses, Problems of Good and Evil and Moral Dilemmas of War and Peace with enabling him to survive eight years of captivity.

On March 24, 1987, Rhinelander died at the age of 79. At the time of his death, he was survived by his wife Virginia; two brothers, Federic and Laurens; a son, Philip M. Rhinelander; three daughters, Helen R. Thompson, Jane R. Todd, and Virginia R. Edelen; and thirteen grandchildren.

== See also ==
- American philosophy
- List of American philosophers
