= The Voice Festival UK =

The Voice Festival UK (VF-UK) is a UK arts education charity dedicated to contemporary a cappella, unaccompanied singing.

The Voice Festival's central purpose is to increase the awareness and popularity of the a cappella art form in the UK, and to support the development of the existing UK a cappella scene, by recruiting and encouraging new participants, developing new audiences, supporting and educating existing participants and building UK a cappella communities.

== History ==
Founded in 2008, the Voice Festival UK was conceived by two a cappella singers from the University of Oxford, who wanted to help support and develop the growing a cappella scene in the UK. In its infancy, the Voice Festival offered a competition for university a cappella groups alongside workshops, and had around eight participating groups.

Still run by a growing team of volunteers, the organisation has increased its offering year on year, and now offers a series of workshops, masterclasses, concerts, competitions and networking events for singers of all ages across three separate programmes: youth, university and community. Events takes place throughout the year, with highlights being the annual Festival Weekend in Spring, and a showcase at the Edinburgh Fringe Festival in August.

From 2009 to 2010, there were three regional rounds of the Festival, held in Oxford, Cambridge and St Andrews. In 2011, two new regional rounds were added in London and Birmingham. In 2012, the Cambridge round was scrapped due to lack of participants, but was replaced by a round in Bristol. This year also saw youth and community categories added to the competition. In 2014, regional rounds were replaced by a single video round.

On three occasions, the winners of the annual university competition have been invited to perform at the ICCA final in New York. In 2009, Out of the Blue came second in the finals. The 2010 winners, The Oxford Gargoyles, were unable to compete in the final in New York due to the University of Oxford's exam timetable. Cadenza competed in the ICCA finals in New York in 2011 but did not place.

== Discography ==
The Voice Festival UK has released two compilation albums, showcasing cover songs arranged and performed by both professional and amateur a cappella artists from across the UK. The Voice Collection 2013 was released at the London A Cappella Festival. The Voice Collection II arrived three years later, released at the 2016 Festival Weekend.

=== The Voice Collection 2013 ===
No.	Song title	Artist
1.	Free	The Boxettes
2.	Summer Senses	Fuchsia
3.	Rumour Has It / Mercy	In The Pink
4.	Hide and Seek	All The King's Men
5.	Til There Was You	Finesse
6.	Jailhouse Rock	Voces8
7.	Roxanne	The Oxford Belles
8.	Addicted to Love	The Refrains
9.	Smile Please	Jack Telfer St. Claire
10.	Ex Factor	In The Smoke
11.	It Was Almost Like A Song	Havoc
12.	Improvisation	Shlomo vs. Ruby Wood
13.	You've Got The Love	Apollo5
14.	High (Forever You And Me)	Vive
15.	Earthquake	The Techtonics

=== The Voice Collection II ===
No.	Song title	Artist
1.	Burn	AfterParty
2.	Sam Smith Medley	The Rolling Tones
3.	Blindsided	The Accidentals
4.	Holding Out For A Hero	The Scopes
5.	Rich Man	Semi-Toned
6.	I Feel Like A Woman	Oxford Gargoyles
7.	Galvanize	The Songsmiths
8.	Bad Romance	Restless Symphony
9.	Accidentally In Love	Killer Quines
10.	Just Be	The Bristol Suspensions
11.	Last Night	The Beatroots
12.	Use Somebody	The Wellingtones
13.	Michael Jackson Medley	The Cosmopolitones
14.	She Will Be Loved	Choir of Dave
15.	Happy	2014 Festival Weekend Participants

== Results of the University Competition ==
=== 2009–2013 ===
Year	Cambridge Regional	Oxford Regional	St Andrews Regional	Birmingham Regional	London Regional	Bristol Regional	Wildcard	Overall winner
2009	Cadenza; The Oxford Alternotives	Out of the Blue; The Oxford Belles	The Other Guys; The Alleycats	Not applicable	Not applicable	Not applicable	Not awarded	Out of the Blue
2010	Cadenza; The Fitz Sirens	Out of the Blue; The Oxford Gargoyles	The Alleycats; The Accidentals	Not applicable	Not applicable	Not applicable	Fitz Barbershop	The Oxford Gargoyles
2011	Cadenza	Out of the Blue	The Accidentals	Augmented Seven	All The King's Men	Not applicable	Not awarded	Cadenza
2012	Not applicable	Out of the Blue	The Other Guys	Sons of Pitches	All The King's Men	HotTUBBS	Not awarded	All The King's Men
2013	Not applicable	The Oxford Alternotives	Choral Stimulation	Sons of Pitches	All the King's Men; Vive	Semi-Toned	Not awarded	Vive

=== 2014–present ===
The 2014 competition saw a change in format, in which the regional rounds were scrapped, and competitors applied for the competition via video entry, from which 12 groups were taken through to a 'semi-final', and then five groups went through to the final. This allowed more groups to apply, and ensured that all groups were judged fairly and equally by one set of judges.

Year	Semi-Finalists	Finalists	Overall winner
2014	The Accidentals, The Alleycats, All the King’s Men, Choral Stimulation, The King's Chicks, Out of the Blue, The Scopes, Semi-Toned, The Songsmiths, The Sons of Pitches, The Techtonics, The Uptone Girls	All the King’s Men, Out of the Blue, Semi-Toned, The Songsmiths, The Techtonics	Out of the Blue
2015	Aberpella, The Accidentals, The Alleycats, All the King's Men, Aquapella, The Bristol Suspensions, Choral Stimulation, The Rolling Tones, The Scopes, Semi-Toned, The Songsmiths, Sweet Nothings	Semi-Toned, The Alleycats, The Songsmiths, Choral Stimulation, The Rolling Tones	Semi-Toned Ward Swingle Award for Originality: Choral Stimulation
2016	Sweet Nothings, Northern Lights, Pitch Fight, Aquapella, The Bluebelles, The Alleycats, Killer Quines, RadioOctave, The Songsmiths, Bristol Suspensions, Cadenza, The Rolling Tones	The Bristol Suspensions, The Songsmiths, Cadenza, Aquapella, The Rolling Tones	The Bristol Suspensions
2017	Aberpella, Aca-pocalypse, The Bluebelles, In The Pink, RadioOctave, The Rolling Tones, The Songsmiths, Sweet Nothings, Tone Up, Vocal Focus, Vox	In The Pink, The Rolling Tones, The Songsmiths, Sweet Nothings, Tone Up	The Rolling Tones
2018	Aca-pocalypse, Academy, Aquapella, Decibelles, Alvarium (formerly known as Fantastic Beats and Where to Find Them), Killer Quines, Licence to Trill, Pitch Fight, RadioOctave, Tone Up, Cosmopolitones, The Oxford Commas	Licence to Trill, Pitch Fight, Aquapella, Tone Up, Alvarium (formerly known as Fantastic Beats and Where to Find Them)	Aquapella

== Results of the Youth Competition ==
Year	Overall winner
2012	Acabelles
2013	The Wellingtones
2014	The Tiffinians
2015	The Dreamettes
2016	The Tiffinians
2018	The King's Barbers

== Results of the Community Competition ==
Year	Overall winner
2012	In The Smoke
2013	Original Sing
2015	In The Smoke
2016	In The Smoke
