= The Alleycats (University of St Andrews) =

Cappella group

- Origin: St Andrews, Scotland
- Genre: A cappella
- Years active: 2001–present
- Website: www.thealleycats.co.uk

The Alleycats are a Scottish collegiate a cappella group, hailing from the University of St Andrews, Scotland. The group was established in 2001. Since then, they have released nine albums, performing across the UK.

== History ==
=== 2001–09: Formation and early years ===
The group was formed in 2001 by two students, Ben Murray and Dan Wright and soon grew with the addition of George Hollis, Matt King, Vince Wong, Nigel Mattinson, Bill Calderhead and David Caves. In the following years, the group set about increasing their reputation around the university, performing at several gigs around the university town. Originally an all-male group, in 2007 girls were permitted to audition, and today the group consists of roughly half males and half females. They recorded four albums before 2008, the titles of which played on the feline name of the group : Their debut album, The Cat Pack; More Than A Feline; Cat Fight and Platinum Chat.

The group released their fifth studio album in 2008, entitled Meow, That's What I Call Music. That year, they applied to be on the BBC's primetime show, Last Choir Standing, where they progressed to the final 15. However, they were eliminated in Heat 1.

In March 2009, the group entered the inaugural Voice Festival UK competition at the semifinal stage, held in St Andrews. In the semifinal, they won the award for 'Outstanding Performance' for their mash-up of "Dance Wiv Me", "Lovestoned" and "Billie Jean", and progressed to the final in London.

That year, they also released their sixth studio album, Press Paws, which included tracks they had performed during Last Choir Standing.

=== 2010: Cat Touch This and Edinburgh Fringe Debut ===
In March 2010, the group competed in the Voice Festival for the second time and progressed to the final again, winning the award for 'Outstanding Performance' for their overall set in the final.

From 16 to 21 August of that year, the group debuted in the Edinburgh Fringe Festival 2010 and were given an official Sell-Out Show award.

=== 2011: We're Not Kitten ===
The group released an album titled We're Not Kitten, featuring some of the songs that had earned them success at the Edinburgh Fringe Festival in 2010. Featured on the album, their arrangement of 'Titanium' featuring Heather Robertson earned them the #2 spot in the UACUK (The UK University A Cappella Blog)'s "Best of British 2012". In the Voice Festival UK 2011 and 2012, the Alleycats were awarded "Outstanding Vocal Percussion", for Cammy Dobbie's performances, as well as "Outstanding Choreography" for Philip De Winter Shaw's work on "Till the World Ends / DJ Got us fallin' in love / Tonight".

The group performed at the Edinburgh Fringe Festival in 2013 for two weeks (31 July – 13 August) achieving 4-Star reviews.

=== 2013: Furplay ===
In November 2013, The Alleycats released their EP, Furplay, as a three track teaser for their album, released in 2014. The EP was recorded and produced by Liquid 5th, a studio based in the US.

=== 2014: Careless Whisker ===
In August 2014, The Alleycats released their album, Careless Whisker. The album was again recorded and produced by Liquid 5th, a studio based in the US.

=== 2014: US Tour ===
In January 2014, The Alleycats embarked on their first tour to the East coast of the US. For 10 days they traveled around Boston, New Haven, New York and New Jersey, visiting and singing with other university groups. They visited the Yale Spizzwinks, Tufts Sq!, The Boston College Bostonians, the MIT Chorallaries, the NYU Mixtapes and the Princeton Katzenjammers as well as performing at the Spence School in NYC.

=== 2017: Scottish A Capella Championship ===
In March 2017, the group successfully captured the title for the Scottish A Capella Championship with a set of "Dangerous Women / Crazy / Crazy in Love / Animal / Hey Now" against many other Scottish A Capella groups such as The Other Guys, The Accidentals, and 2016 Championship winner The Belles & The Beaus. In addition, Best Arrangement was awarded to Musical Director Lauren Gage, and special mention went to Caitlin Macdonald for her solo and to Joe Revell for his Vocal Percussion.

== Current members ==
The members of the group can change every year as old students graduate and new students enroll. As of 2026, there are 11 members in the group, with Shantiv Monga as Manager and Sarah Al-Hajj and Ben Stockil as Co- Musical Directors.

Members in italics are new members of the year. Members with asterisk * left the group in the middle of the year.

=== 2026 ===
Soprano	Alto	Mezzo-Soprano	Tenor	Baritone	Bass
Sarah Al-Hajj	Naila Reham	Jillian McLeod	Shantiv Monga	Zach Halna du Fretay	James Carder-Geddes
Tessa Huston Fuller	Abigail Sheehan		Jeremy Kwan	Ben Stockil	
			Kanishk Majumder (VP)		

=== 2025 ===
Soprano	Alto	Mezzo-Soprano	Tenor	Baritone	Bass
Sarah Al-Hajj	Annie Melich	Naila Reham	Shantiv Monga	Zach Halna du Fretay	James Carder-Geddes
Emma Koonce	Rowan Pelfrey	Josephine Bonnot	Jeremy Kwan	Ben Stockil	
Sophie Pong		Jillian McLeod			
Roseanna McNaught-Davis					

=== 2024 ===
Soprano	Alto	Tenor	Baritone	Bass
Emma Koonce	Jillian McLeod	Alex Barnard	Zach Halna du Fretay	Josh Lightwing
Sarah Al-Hajj	Annie Melich	Ben Stockil		

=== 2019 ===
Soprano	Mezzo	Alto	Tenor	Baritone	Bass
Chloe Somerville	Claire Beattie	Bea Delafaille	Hamish Garratt	Markus Lee	Jamie Rees
Katie Harvey	Bethany Mackay	Grace Deri	Milo Bernfield-Millman	Alex Schellekens*	Eli Thayer

=== 2018 ===
Soprano	Alto	Tenor	Bass
Lauren Gage	Lucy Bishop	Andrew Mundy	Jamie Rees
Claire Beattie	Bea Delafaille	Hamish Garratt	Markus Lee
Nele Templin		Milo Bernfield-Millman*	Alex Schellekens

== Albums and EPs ==
- Careless Whisker (2014)
- Furplay (2013)
- We're Not Kitten (2011)
- Cat Touch This (2010)
- Press Paws (2009)
- Meow, That's What I Call Music (2008)
- Platinum Chat
- Cat Fight
- More Than A Feline
- The Cat Pack

== Reviews ==
Three Weeks UACUK Broadway Baby Edinburgh Fringe 'What's on' Vocal Australia Edinburgh Fringe Review (EFR)

== See also ==
- List of collegiate a cappella groups in the UK
