= List of university a cappella groups in the United Kingdom =

This is a list of university a cappella musical groups in the UK who have achieved some level of notability or recognition. The two main competitions for university a cappella in the UK are the 'Universities' section of the Voice Festival UK (which ran from 2009 to 2018) and the International Championship of Collegiate A Cappella, which has had a UK semi-final and regional quarter-finals since 2015. University groups also enter, and have had success in, the UK's Open A capella Competition (OAC), which has run since 2020. Many university a cappella groups have performed at the Edinburgh Fringe Festival. Some British university groups have had success in the international Contemporary A Cappella Society's (CASA) recording awards and video awards.

== University of Aberdeen ==
=== Aberpella ===
Aberpella are a University of Aberdeen a cappella ensemble. They first competed in the St Andrews round of the Voice Festival UK in 2012. They competed in the semi-finals of the Voice Festival UK in 2015 and placed third in the regional quarter-final of ICCA in 2017.

The group also performed a week long run of their 2016/17 repertoire at the Edinburgh Fringe Festival under the title "Aberpella Presents: 50 Tones of Grey". In 2023, Aberpella placed third at the Scottish A Cappella Championships.

=== Chordiac Arrest ===
Chordiac Arrest were formed in the summer of 2011 by a group of medical students. Although they have performed at some events in Aberdeen, most recently being joint winners of the open Vocal Group class (V21) in the Aberdeenshire Music Festival, they have never entered the Voice Festival UK. They disbanded in the summer of 2012, as final year of medicine spread the group far and wide on rural placements. However a reunion of six members formed GCS-3 (the Gangster Coma Scales - 3) who performed at a Christmas Concert in 2012, with the American group Pentatonix as their inspiration.

== University of Bath ==
=== The Alley Barbers ===
The longest-running vocal group at Bath University, The Alley Barbers sing a wide range of songs in four part harmony, often in the barbershop style. Current conductor and former student member, Tim Greeves, succeeded the director of student music-making, Robin Jackson, on his retirement in 2005. The founder of Bristol University's TUBBS A Cappella was a member of the Alley Barbers from 2000 to 2001.

=== Aquapella ===
Aquapella won an 'Outstanding Musicality' award in their regional heat in the 2013 Voice Festival UK and reached the semi-final in 2015. In 2016 they reached the final for the first time, winning the 'Outstanding Musicality' award. They released an EP Lambda in 2015.

They won the UK ICCA semi-final in 2017 and 2019, and came third in 2023. In 2020, they won the 'Exceptional Choreography' award at the first Open A cappella Competition and were runners-up in 2023, again winning the 'Exceptional Choreography' award.

== University of Birmingham ==
=== The Sons of Pitches ===
The Sons of Pitches are an all-male a cappella group formed in October 2010by Mark Nathan. In 2011, they took part in the inaugural Birmingham semifinal of the Voice Festival UK. In 2012, they won the Birmingham semifinal of Voice Festival UK, and competed at the final in London. They returned to the London finals again in 2013 where they received more awards than any other group in the competition, being recognised for 'Outstanding Arrangement', 'Outstanding Vocal Percussion', 'Outstanding Choreography/Stagecraft' and 'Outstanding Performance', but ultimately lost overall to Vive from Guildhall. However, just a few weeks later The Sons of Pitches won the 'International Wildcard Round' of the International Championships of Collegiate A Cappella (ICCA), and competed in the International Finals at The Town Hall, New York City, on 20 April 2013.

In September and October 2015 The Sons of Pitches were one of the a cappella groups who appeared in the Gareth Malone BBC television series, The Naked Choir. The choir won the competition.

=== The Uptone Girls ===
The Birmingham Songbirds were an all-female a cappella group. In 2012 they reached the Birmingham semifinal of the Voice Festival UK. Later that year, they changed their name to 'The Uptone Girls'.

=== Former Groups ===
Augmented Seven were a mixed-voice a cappella group from the University of Birmingham formed in 2010 by Tom Johnson and Mark Nathan. They were University of Birmingham's first a cappella group and only mixed group. In 2011, the group entered the Voice Festival UK at the inaugural Birmingham semifinal, and progressed to the final after winning the 'Outstanding Performance' award. Later that year, the group split up due to artistic differences. Three of its male members went on to join the second incarnation of The Sons of Pitches from 2011 to 2012. This group has since disbanded.

The Lorelites were an all-female a cappella group formed in January 2011. In 2011 they took part in the first Birmingham semifinal of the Voice Festival UK. Now defunct.

== University of Bristol ==
=== Academy ===
Academy are the university's all-male-identifying a cappella group formed in 2015 by Nick Jones. In the summer of 2017, Academy appeared on Sky One's Sing: Ultimate A Cappella, opening the first episode. In 2018, their first year of competing and Jones' first year as music director, Academy progressed to the ICCA UK Final in London's New Wimbledon Theatre. Later in the same year, Academy reached the semifinals of the Voice Festival UK. In August 2018, Academy made their Edinburgh Fringe debut performing the joint show "Academy and Pitch Fight present: Buy One, Get One Free" alongside their sister group Pitch Fight. In December 2018, Academy released their first single and music video, Jones' arrangement of LunchMoney Lewis' "Bills", which featured in their 2018 ICCA set. The group reached the ICCA UK final again in 2019, their second year entering the competition, with beatboxer Cem Rifat winning Outstanding Vocal Percussion at the quarterfinal stage. In 2020 Academy recorded and released their debut album "Exhibit A". The album went on to receive five CARA nominations, including two for their version of Mark Ronson's "Bang Bang Bang". The group went on to win the CARA for Best Lower Voices Collegiate Song, and came runner-up for Best Debut Scholastic Album.

=== All Sharps ===
All Sharps (formerly known as HotTUBBS) were an auditioned a cappella group partially-contained within TUBBS A Cappella. Formed in 2008, they have won medals at the Manchester Amateur Choral Competition and Oxford Music Festival. They had also been semi-finalists in Voice Festival UK twice: in 2012 and in 2015. HotTUBBS rebranded at the end of 2017 to become All Sharps.

=== The Bristol Suspensions ===
The Bristol Suspensions placed third in their ICCA regional quarter-final in 2016, as well as achieving an award for Outstanding Arrangement in Aliak Bedirian's 'Madness/Magic'; they did not place in the semi-final but did receive an Outstanding Vocal Percussion for Scott Lechleiter. They also won the 2016 Voice Festival UK university competition. For three consecutive years (2017–2019), the group placed in the top three groups at the ICCA UK Finals and were runner-up in 2019 (missing first place by one point). In 2018 and 2019, the group won special awards for 'Outstanding Choreography' and 'Outstanding Vocal Percussion', awarded to Performance Directors: Sam Walter (2018 and 2019) and Alessia Doyle (2019) and Vocal Percussionists: James Dempsey (2018 and 2019) and Jonny Simon (2019) respectively. In the 2021 virtual edition of ICCA, the group progressed to the international final of the competition with their version of "The Heartburn Song" by Lawrence, picking up awards for Vocal Percussion, Arrangement and Audio Mixing on the way. In 2022 they won the CASA Contemporary A Cappella Recording Awards for Best Scholastic Debut Album or EP, for Best European Album or EP and for Best Mixed Voices Collegiate Album with Red Hot, and Best Funk / Disco Song with Funk from Red Hot.

=== The Bristones/Top Note/The Tone Rangers (formerly known as TUBBS A Cappella) ===
The University of Bristol Barbershop Singers were a society formed in 2007 at the University of Bristol from an earlier quartet. The society was started by Iain Hallam, who was musical director for most of the next ten years, and who went on to direct British mixed barbershop chorus champions Bristol A Cappella from their formation in 2013. There were three main unauditioned choruses (for upper, lower and mixed voices) and HotTUBBS (now the All Sharps), plus numerous quartets and smaller ensembles. Several member quartets have competed at national barbershop finals, with Park Street and Patchwork qualifying to represent the UK at international competitions. In 2014, Park Street became the National Barbershop Quartet Champions. Following their Edinburgh Fringe show 'Cheap Trills' in 2017, TUBBS A Cappella was rebranded as three new unauditioned groups: The Bristones (mixed voices), Top Note (upper voices) and The Tone Rangers (lower voices).

=== Pitch Fight ===
Pitch Fight are a 14-piece all female identifying competitive a cappella group formed in 2015. In 2016 they competed in the VoiceFest. They have appeared on national television in Sky One's Sing: Ultimate A Cappella. They were runners up in the ICCA 2018 Exeter quarterfinal, picking up awards for "Outstanding Choreography" and "Outstanding Solo"; they also won the "Outstanding Soloist" award at the UK semifinal, finishing outside of the top three. Ttwo weeks later they were VoiceFest 2018 finalists. In August 2018 they debuted at the Edinburgh Festival Fringe alongside their brother group Academy A Cappella with their joint show "Academy and Pitch Fight present: Buy One, Get One Free" which was sold out for its final two performances. In 2019, Pitch Fight once again qualified for the ICCA UK Final by placing as runners up in the Exeter quarterfinal, along with picking up the "Outstanding Choreography" award. Pitch Fight returned to the Edinburgh fringe in August 2019 with their aca-brothers, Academy, to perform "Romeo & Juliet: An A Capella Tragedy". In 2020 they recorded their first EP, Purple Reign, which released on 26 September. The group placed third in the UK semifinal of the virtual ICCA in 2021, receiving the award for "Outstanding Choreography" at the quarterfinals.

== University of Cambridge ==
=== Cadenza ===
Cadenza are a mixed-voice group formed in 1997 and performing pop and jazz pieces. They have released an EP, Under the Lights.

In March 2011, the group won the Voice Festival UK. In January 2012, it was confirmed that Cadenza would not be competing in the Voice Festival UK in 2012, thus becoming the first ever group not to try and retain their title.

They reached the final of the Voice Festival UK again in 2016, picking up an 'Outstanding Arrangement' award after also winning an 'Outstanding Musicality' award in the semi-final.

=== Fitz Barbershop ===
Fitz Barbershop are an all-male a cappella group founded in 1994 at Fitzwilliam College but taking members of all colleges. In 2009, the group entered the inaugural Voice Festival UK competition in the Cambridge semifinal. They won the award for 'Outstanding Musicality' for Wonderful Tonight. In 2010 they entered again, winning the award for 'Outstanding Performance' and the 'Ward Swingle Award for Originality'. They went on to claim the 'Outstanding Performance' award again in the final. In March 2014 the group put on a 20th anniversary concert alongside the Fitz Sirens at Fitzwilliam College.

=== The Fitz Sirens ===
The Fitz Sirens are an all-female a cappella group affiliated to Fitzwilliam College, established in 1994. In 2010, performing as The Sirens, they reached the final of the Voice Festival UK, where they won the award for 'Outstanding Musicality'.

=== The King's Men ===
The King's Men are the close harmony group formed from the Choral Scholars of the Choir of King's College, Cambridge. They performed on BBC Radio 3 in 2016.

== Cardiff University ==
Cardiff University A Cappella society was established in 2013 and currently has four groups: Acappellads, DeciBelles, InterChorus and Vox. Cardiff University A Cappella Society performs two showcases a year (Winter and Spring) and gig/busk throughout the year. The society has also been booked for weddings. In 2019, the society had a membership of 116 across the groups, making them a large society at Cardiff University for the first time in their five-year history.

=== DeciBelles ===
The DeciBelles came third in their ICCA quarterfinal in Exeter in 2019, qualifying for the ICCA UK semifinal. They also reached the ICCA UK Semifinals in 2020. The same year, they won the inaugural Open A cappella Competition, with group member Jade Harvey picking up the 'Exceptional Vocal Percussion' award.

=== Vox ===
Vox won the 'People's Choice' award at the Open A cappella Competition in both 2024 and 2025. They were also featured on the hit Netflix show Sex Education.

== Durham University ==
=== Northern Lights ===
Northern Lights are the leading competitive mixed voice a cappella group from Durham University. The group was formed as Palatinotes in 2013 and in their first year they performed at the 2014 Edinburgh Fringe Festival. In 2015 they released their first single, Dancing in the Moonlight, reached the UK semi-final of the ICCAs, picking up an award for 'Outstanding Vocal Percussion', and returned to the Edinburgh Fringe with their show, The Northern Lights Display.

In 2016 they competed again in the ICCAs, coming second in their quarter-final and winning both 'Outstanding Soloist' and 'Outstanding Vocal Percussion' awards. They also competed in the semi-final of the Voice Festival UK. They took part in a concert of Shakespeare-inspired music in Durham Cathedral in June 2016 along with other Durham University music groups, celebrating the 400th anniversary of Shakespeare's death. In August 2016 they released their first EP, Bright Lights Small City, before returning to the Edinburgh Fringe for a third run with their show, 'The Voice Awakens'.

Northern Lights were the winners of the Northern region quarter-final of the 2017 ICCAs, once again taking home 'Outstanding Soloist' and 'Outstanding Vocal Percussion'. They also took their show Fantastic Beats and Where to Find Them to the Edinburgh Fringe after a one-night preview at Durham's Assembly Rooms Theatre.

In 2018, Northern Lights put on their first show with a group from outside the university, collaborating with the youth choir Urban Voices at the Gala Theatre in Durham. Later that year, they placed third in the UK semi-final of the ICCAs after winning the Northern quarter-finals, where they also won 'Outstanding Soloist' and 'Outstanding Arrangement'. They also recorded their second EP, Castles in the Sky.

Northern Lights won the Northern quarter-final of ICCA again in 2019, also receiving 'Outstanding Soloist' and 'Outstanding Arrangement' awards. The following year, Northern Lights placed 2nd in the UK semi-final, after winning the Northern quarter-final for the fourth time in a row, and received 'Outstanding Soloist'. In 2022, they placed third in the UK semi-final, after winning their quarter-final, and received 'Outstanding Arrangement' and 'Outstanding Soloist' once again. They also featured in A Capella at the Gala as part of Durham County Council's Durham Vocal Festival, a music outreach event aimed at young people from across the North East of England.

In 2023, they released their debut album, Meet Me In The Sky and won the Open A cappella Competition, also taking home the 'Exceptional Arrangement' award. They also won the ICCA UK semi-final for the first time, after winning their quarter-final, and received 'Outstanding Arrangement' and 'Outstanding Choreography' awards. They received four nominations for the CASA Contemporary A Cappella Recording Awards 2023 for their 2022 ICCA set.

They successfully defended their ICCA UK title in 2024, after coming second in their quarter-final, and received an 'Outstanding Choreography' award. They won the Outstanding Video Editing award for their ICCA 2023 set at the CASA Contemporary A Cappella Video Awards 2024, which was also the runner-up for the Best Mixed Voices Collegiate Video award. They were runner-up for the Best Show Tunes / Soundtrack / Theme Song award at the CASA Contemporary A Cappella Recording Awards 2024 with Where Is Love? from Meet Me In The Sky, which was also nominated for Best European Album or EP.

In 2025, the Northern Lights won the Open A capella Competition and also picked up the 'Exceptional Arrangement' and 'Exceptional Choreography' awards. They also again defended their ICCA UK title for the third time, becoming the first UK group to take a hat-trick of titles, and came third in the ICCA international finals, becoming the first mixed British group to finish in the top three globally.

In 2026, the Northern Lights won the UK ICCA title for the fourth year in succession, also picking up an Outstanding Choreography award. As UK champions, they advanced again too the international final of ICCA in New York, where they came second and picked up awards for Outstanding Arrangement and Outstanding Choreography. A Northern Lights alumni group, The Menagerie Club, appeared in Britain's Got Talent series 19 in 2026, progressing to the live semi-finals. The Northern Lights also performed alongside Durham's other three student a cappella groups in the Retro to Remix show at the Gala Theatre in Durham in February 2026.

=== Durham Dynamics ===
Durham Dynamics are another mixed voice a cappella group at Durham University, formed in 2015. Since 2019 they have (except for an interruption due to Covid) held a joint annual show with Northern Lights dubbed "Pitch Durfect". They performed their show "An A Cappella Road Trip!" at the Edinburgh Fringe in 2022. They also performed alongside Durham's other three student a cappella groups in the Retro to Remix show at the Gala Theatre in Durham in February 2026.

=== Foot Notes ===
Foot Notes are a mixed voice close harmony group at Durham University, who have regularly appeared at the Edinburgh Fringe, including with "At the Foot of the Castle" in 2024. They also performed alongside Durham's other three student a cappella groups in the Retro to Remix show at the Gala Theatre in Durham in February 2026.

=== Full Score ===
Full Score, formed in 2017, are a mixed-voice barbershop group at Durham University, who are active in British Association of Barbershop Singers competitions and who perform regularly within Durham alongside other Durham Student Music societies. They have performed at the Edinburgh Fringe in 2019 and 2022. They also performed alongside Durham's other three student a cappella groups in the Retro to Remix show at the Gala Theatre in Durham in February 2026.

== University of Exeter ==
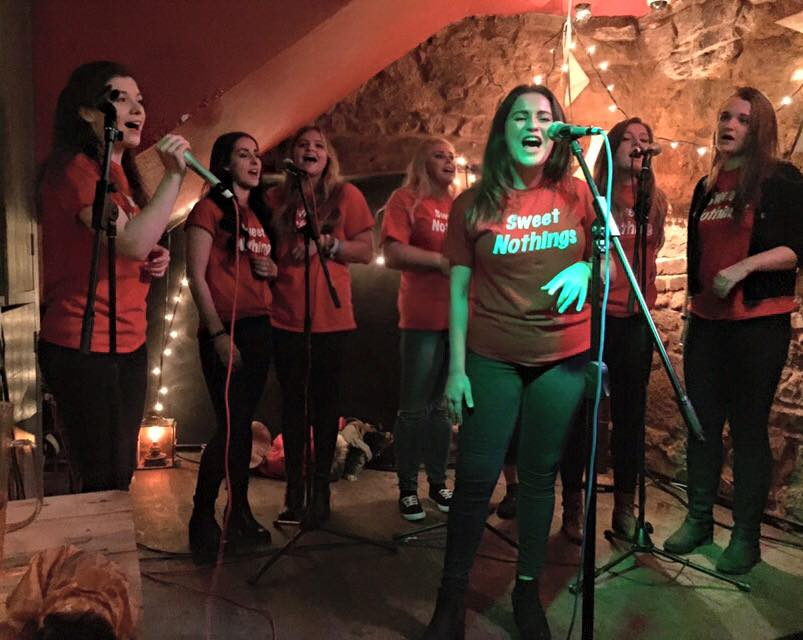
The Sweet Nothings are one of the University of Exeter's eight A Capella groups.

=== Sweet Nothings ===
Sweet Nothings are an all-female group from Exeter University. They were formed in 2006 and as such are the oldest group at the university. In 2009, they competed in the inaugural Voice Festival UK competition and in 2012 they competed again, winning an award for 'Outstanding Performance' in the Bristol regional round.

They have competed twice in the semi-finals of the International Championship of Collegiate A Cappella and three times at the Voice Festival UK, winning the award for 'Outstanding Vocal Percussion' in 2016.

In May 2015 they recorded their first ever 5-track EP titled Unwrapped with The Vocal Company. They performed their first show at the 2014 Edinburgh Festival Fringe named 'Go Sweet or Go Home' and returned with 'Unwrapped' (2015), 'We Need To Talk' (2016) and in 2017 turned the tables (being an all female group) and sang songs traditionally sung by men in their show 'Who Run the World?'. In 2018 they performed 'Sweet Nothings Live at the Edinburgh Fringe!' and in 2019 'Ocean's 9'. The coronavirus pandemic of 2020 closed down all Edinburgh Festival performances and tourism but Sweet Nothings returned in 2021 with their show 'Now That's What I Call Timeless' and again in 2022 with 'A Night at the Movies'.

=== Semi-Toned ===
Semi-Toned are an all-male contemporary a cappella group who sing a variety of modern and classic songs. They were formed in October 2010

They competed for the first time in The Voice Festival UK in 2012, winning both "Outstanding Arrangement" and "Outstanding Vocal Percussion". In 2013 the group won the South West regional, advancing to the London final, as well as "Outstanding Stagecraft and Choreography" and, once more, "Outstanding Vocal Percussion". Semi-Toned made their Edinburgh Fringe debut in 2013. Their show "The Exe-Men" was reviewed enthusiastically in a fringe that was not kind to a cappella groups.

In 2014, the group once again reached the final of The Voice Festival UK and winning awards for "Outstanding Arrangement" for their mash-up of "Dear Darlin'" by Olly Murs and "The Fox (What Does The Fox Say?)" by Ylvis, "Outstanding Overall Performance" and "Outstanding Soloist" for Michael Luya in "Motion Picture Soundtrack" by Radiohead. They then continued their Edinburgh Fringe success with 2014's "Toned Up" which saw a second five-star review from Broadway Baby and a prestigious "Bobby" Award, the group becoming the first University ensemble and first a cappella group to achieve this. In September the group recorded its first self-titled 5-track EP with The Vocal Company, featuring covers of John Newman, Daft Punk, Paolo Nutini, Jay Z and Radiohead.

In January 2015, Semi-Toned competed in the Semi-Finals of the ICCA's in London, finishing in second place overall, whilst winning "Outstanding Choreography". Then in April, Semi-Toned won The Voice Festival UK as well as "Outstanding Overall Performance" thereby fully establishing itself upon the UK a cappella scene. Soon after they embarked on their first tour of the East Coast of the United States, visiting and performing with groups from Colombia, NYU, Princeton, Yale and North Eastern College.

=== The Bluebelles ===
The Bluebelles are Exeter University's newest all-female a cappella group. Formed in September 2013 the Bluebelles are an all-female group that started out focusing on jazz and barbershop-style music, however have recently moved towards a more contemporary repertoire. They perform a wide variety of genres, and have performed at the Edinburgh Festival Fringe since 2015. The group also released their debut EP "Double Denim" on 8 August 2018.

=== Illuminations ===
Illuminations are a mixed a cappella group, formed by Emily Botsford and Charlotte Mckeown in October 2011, who sing music ranging from modern pop to rock classics. In their 2012–2013 season the group performed for BBC's Children in Need and competed in their first Voice Festival UK, receiving a personal commendation for stagecraft. They competed in the ICCA quarter-finals competition 2016 at Exeter University, winning Best Soloist.

The group placed second at the 2017 South West quarterfinal of ICCA. The same year, they performed at the Edinburgh Fringe and also competed on the Sky One show Sing: Ultimate A Cappella, reaching the final round and placing second in their heat. The group returned to Edinburgh in 2018 to perform a second Fringe show 'By Process Of Illumination' and planned to release an EP and music video that summer. In 2019 they performed their third Edinburgh Fringe show, 'Minds Alight'. The coronavirus pandemic of 2020 closed down all Edinburgh Festival performances and tourism but Illuminations returned in 2021 with their show 'Somebody Special - The Aca-Betrayal' and again in 2022 with 'The 11th Hour'. As of 2021, the group had twelve members, ranging from first to fourth years.

=== Former groups ===
The Madrigals were a mixed a cappella group from Exeter University formed in 2008 by Ben Pennington. They specialised in singing madrigals. The group has since disbanded.

Hoi Rhapsodoi were a mixed a cappella group that sang a range of secular and sacred music. The group has since disbanded in 2016.

== University of Glasgow ==
=== Choral Stimulation ===
Choral Stimulation are a mixed-voice a cappella group from the University of Glasgow formed in 2008. Since 2010, they have competed in the Voice Festival UK at the St Andrews semifinal. In 2011, they won the award for 'Outstanding Performance'. In 2013, they became the first group outside of St Andrews to win the VF-UK Regional for Scotland, going on to compete in London as well as picking up the award for 'Outstanding Arrangement'.

In September and October 2015 Choral Stimulation were one of eight groups who appeared in the BBC television series, The Naked Choir, after auditions from 400 groups from across the UK.

== Guildhall School of Music and Drama ==
=== The Conchords ===
The Conchords are an a cappella group from the Guildhall School of Music and Drama, who won the UK ICCA semi-final in 2020 and 2022, also picking up 'Outstanding Soloist' awards in both the semi-final and their quarter-final in 2020.

== Imperial College London ==
=== The Techtonics ===
The Techtonics are an all-male a cappella group from Imperial College London formed in the summer of 2008 by Christian Carter and Ed Brightman. The group became an immediate success on campus, coming second on Imperial Idol 2009, and appearing alongside Athlete and Noel Fielding at Imperial's Summer Ball that year.

In 2010, they participated in the Cambridge semifinal of the Voice Festival UK, and Carter received the award for 'Outstanding Arrangement' of Robbie Williams' "Come Undone". The following year, they competed in the newly formed London semifinal, and won the award for 'Outstanding Performance'.

The group took a show to the Edinburgh Festival Fringe for a week in the summer of 2010 and sold out on their final performance. Between 28 August and 4 September 2011, the group embarked upon a tour of Croatia alongside the Imperial College Chamber Choir, and competed in the Vocal Marathon a cappella competition. They were described as "setting the audience on fire" and bringing a "fresh and positive energy" to the competition.

The group competed in the London Regional Round of the Voice Festival UK 2012, claiming awards for 'Outstanding Performance' and 'Outstanding Soloist'. The Techtonics won the International Championship of Collegiate A Cappella in 2016.

The group returned to the ICCA in 2020, placing third in the UK semi-final after winning their quarter-final. In the 2021 virtual running of ICCA, The Techtonics placed second in the UK, receiving awards for best audio mixing along the way.

=== Imperielles ===
Formed in 2011, Imperielles are Imperial's most established all-female a cappella group. They won the award for Outstanding Soloist at the international semi-finals of the International Championship of Collegiate A Cappella (ICCAs) in 2015 and competed in Voice Festival UK in March 2012 and 2014.

=== Harmaphrodite ===
Harmaphrodite were formed in 2006 by Jessica Gillingwater. The group are no longer in existence but performed at Exhibition Road Music Day in 2006 and 2007. They competed in the Voice Festival 2011 in the London Regional Round.

=== Nth Harmonic ===
Nth Harmonic are an a cappella group from Imperial College. They placed third in the 2024 Open A cappella Competition and, in the same year, came second in their ICCA quarter-final.

== King's College London ==
=== All The King's Men ===
All The King's Men were an all-male a cappella group from King's College, London. They were formed by freshers in September 2009, and went on to have a sell-out run at the Edinburgh Festival Fringe in 2010.

In 2011, they entered the Voice Festival UK and won their regional round, also claiming the award for 'Outstanding Musicality'. In the final, they won the award for 'Outstanding Performance' with their mashup of "Boogie Nights" and "I Don't Feel Like Dancin'". In the summer of that year, they returned to the Edinburgh Festival Fringe.

On 11 February 2012 they won the London Regional round of Voice Festival UK for the second year running. They were also awarded the prize for Outstanding Choreography.

In February 2012 the group toured the West Coast of America performing at many universities including Claremont, USC, UC Stanford and UC Berkeley.

On 10 March 2012 All the King's Men won the Final of Voice Festival UK. They also won the award for Outstanding Musicality in their arrangement of Hallelujah.

In 2013, they were one of the two teams to progress to the national final from the London regional heat of the Voice Festival, also picking up an 'Outstanding Choreography' award. They progressed to the final again in 2014.

In 2015, they won the UK semi-final of ICCA

The group dissolved in 2020.

=== The Rolling Tones ===
The Rolling Tones are an a cappella group from King's College London. In 2014, the group reached the semi-finals of The Voice Festival UK (under the name The King's Chicks) and in 2015, they reached the finals. They were awarded the prize for 'Outstanding Arrangement' at both the semi-finals and finals for Zara Tso's arrangement of "Awake My Soul", originally performed by Mumford & Sons. They progressed to the final again in 2016, with Zara Tso picking up an 'Outstanding Individual' award in the semi-final.

In 2018, they won the UK semi-final of ICCA and picked up an 'Outstanding Arrangement' award. In 2020, they placed third in their ICCA quarter-final and won an 'Outstanding Soloist' award. In 2023, they came second in the UK semi-final and won an 'Outstanding Choreography' award after winning their quarter-final, where they also picked up an 'Outstanding Choreography' award.

== University of Leeds ==
=== The Songsmiths ===
The Songsmiths are the auditioned, competitive group of the Leeds A Cappella Society at the University of Leeds, founded in 2011. They have reached the UK semi-finals of the ICCAs on three occasions as of 2024, including a third-place finish in 2019. They have performed regularly at the Edinburgh Fringe Festival since 2019, when they performed their show, 10 Things I Hate About A Cappella , and released their debut single, Good Life, in 2023.

They have also hosted the Showcase of Northern A Cappella (SNAC) in Leeds annually since 2018, inviting other university groups from around the North.

== University of Manchester ==
=== The Skylarks ===
The Skylarks are the competitive a cappella group from the University of Manchester. They came second in the ICCA 2026 Birmingham quarterfinal, with Liam Ting receiving a special award for Outstanding Vocal Percussion, and advanced to the ICCA 2026 UK semifinal. They were also featured in the Netflix series "Runaway".

== University of Nottingham ==
The University of Nottingham's A Cappella Society was formed in September 2014, as an umbrella society for a range of auditioned, non-auditioned, mixed-gender, and single-gender groups, across a wide variety of musical styles.

=== RadioOctave ===
RadioOctave are a mixed a cappella group from the University of Nottingham. Formed in 2014, they were the first a cappella group from the university. In 2016, RadioOctave competed at The Voice Festival UK, reaching the semi-finals.

In 2016, RadioOctave appeared on Gareth Malone's The Choir: Best in Britain, competing in the Midlands and Wales category.

The group also performed at the Women's Cricket World Cup Semi-Final in Derby in 2017.

In 2021, RadioOctave came third in their virtual ICCA quarterfinal. In the same year, they were awarded 2nd place in the National University Choir Competition. They finished second in their ICCA quarterfinal in 2022 and third in 2023. In 2022 they also featured on a BBC East Midlands News programme publicising their Edinburgh Fringe show, Ages of Icons, and then in 2022 they performed at Splendour Festival, an annual music festival in Nottingham.

=== Aca-pocalypse ===
Aca-pocalypse are a mixed auditioned a cappella group from the University of Nottingham. Having formed in October 2015, Aca-pocalypse reached the semi-finals of The Voice Festival UK in 2017.

In 2022, Aca-pocalypse won the ICCA UK Quarterfinal #2 with 401 points, receiving the Outstanding Soloist award and advancing to the UK ICCA Semifinal. They had similar success in 2023, getting second place in their quarterfinal and once again reaching the UK Semifinal.

The group's repertoire includes a wide range of genres, from pop and rock to jazz and classical. Aca-Pocalypse has performed at a variety of venues, including the Nottingham Playhouse, Splendour Festival, and the Cambridge Junction. The group won their 2017 Voice Festival UK semifinal and their 2022 ICCA UK Qqarterfinal.

=== Echotones ===
Echotones are a mixed auditioned a cappella group from the University of Nottingham.

== University of Oxford ==
=== Out of the Blue ===
Out of the Blue toured the United States,

The group took part in the International Championship of Collegiate A Cappella (ICCAs) in 2009, progressing to the grand final in New York City, coming second. That year they also won the inaugural Voice Festival UK competition.

In 2011 they took part in Britain's Got Talent and progressed to the live semifinals. They finished fourth in the fourth semifinal and therefore did not progress to the final.

In 2022, the group performed at the Edinburgh Fringe for the 18th time.

=== The Oxford Gargoyles ===
The Oxford Gargoyles are a mixed-voice jazz a cappella group formed in 1998 by Divya Seshamani and Hannah Harper. They have toured the United States several times, appearing on NBC.

In 2007, the group won the Western European semifinal of the ICCAs and progressed to the final in New York. They won the Voice Festival UK in 2010.

In 2012, they won the Open Category of the Choir of the Year competition and performed at the finals, which were broadcast on BBC.

In 2014, the Gargoyles toured Hong Kong and Macau, performing at the first Oxford Asia Alumni Weekend, Cathay Pacific / HSBC Rugby Sevens Weekend, Hong Kong City Hall, Teatro Dom Pedro V, and more than a dozen other venues.

As of 2023, they had appeared at the Edinburgh Festival Fringe every year since 2006.

=== The Oxford Belles ===
The Oxford Belles are one of the two all-female a cappella groups from the University of Oxford. They were formed in 1995 by Helen Whiteley, a year-long visiting student from the University of Virginia who had previously sung with The Virginia Belles.

In 2009, the group reached the London final of the Voice Festival UK and were confirmed as the best female group that year. Following this success, they travelled to New York City later that year, and returned to America in 2010, this time to the West Coast and California.

In 2010, they took a show to the Edinburgh Festival Fringe for the first time since 2000 and received critical acclaim for their performances.

In 2012–2013, the Belles recorded and released a single and a music video. They competed in Voice Festival UK 2013 and received the award for "Outstanding Musicality" in the Oxford regional heat.

In 2023, the Belles participated in Edinburgh Festival Fringe with 5 sold-out shows, winning the Best A Capella award in the Derek Awards, and returned in 2025 with their show 'Saved by the Belles'.

=== The Oxford Alternotives ===
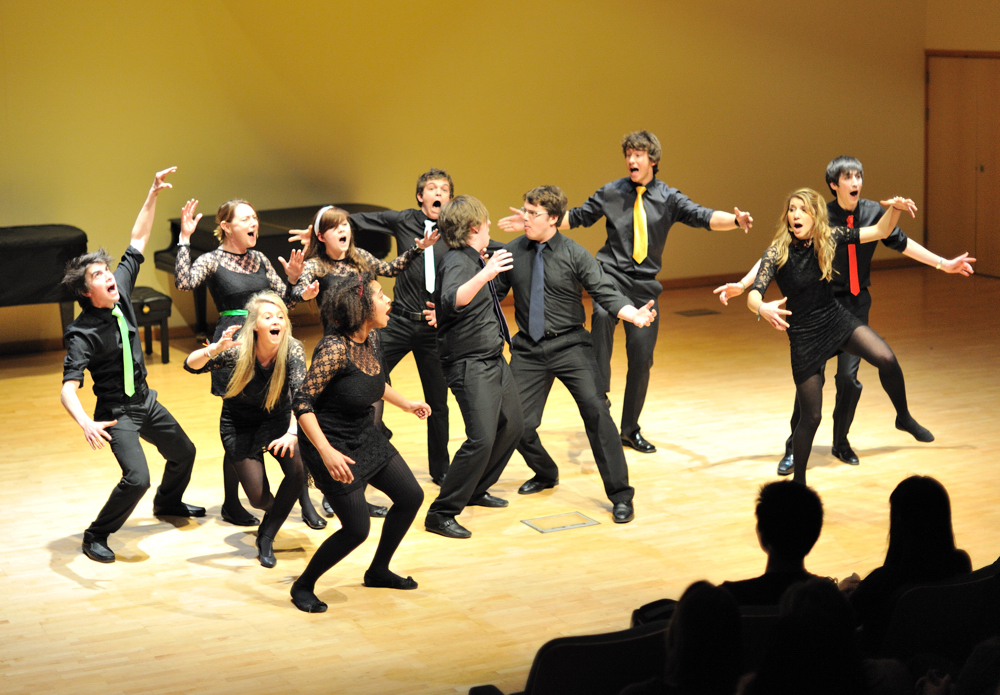
The Oxford Alternotives at the Voice Festival UK Finals 2009, held at the Wathen Hall, St Paul's School, London

The Oxford Alternotives are a mixed-voice a cappella group and the oldest a cappella group from the University of Oxford, having formed in 1993. They were founded as the Oxford University Alternative Singing Society by three students seeking an alternative to the chapel choirs dominating the university music scene at the time.

They have toured the US a number of times, including a performance at the 9/11 memorial service for British victims in New York in 2005. The group has also appeared at the Edinburgh Fringe.

In 2009, the group came second in the Voice Festival UK, winning awards for 'Outstanding Arrangement' and 'Outstanding Soloist', and again qualified for the national final as Oxford regional champions in 2013.

=== In The Pink ===
In The Pink are one of the two all-female a cappella groups from the University of Oxford. They were formed in 2003.

In 2006, the group participated in the ICCAs in Western European semifinal in Oxford. They finished third, with Alexandra Godfree winning the award for 'Outstanding Arrangement' on "Rainy Days and Mondays". In 2007 they entered again, and despite not placing in the top three, Rebecca Dale won the award for 'Outstanding Vocal Percussion'. In 2008, the group participated again, this time in the first of two quarterfinals. This time Suzannah Merchant claimed the award for 'Outstanding Vocal Percussion'.

They have appeared at the Edinburgh Festival Fringe since 2005 and are set to do so again in 2013. As a result of their performance in 2010, they appeared on the Richard Bacon show on Radio 4.

The group have recorded five studio albums: Naked (2005), Tickled Pink (2006), All Mouth No Trousers (2007), By Any Other Name (2008), Pinkredible (2010) and their latest effort "She Who Dares" (2012). They competed in the Oxford round of the Voice Festival UK 2013 and received awards for 'Outstanding Performance' and 'Outstanding Soloist'.

In 2019, the group released 3 music videos: "Color Song/Fallingwater", "Havana X New Rules", and "My Songs Know What You Did in the Dark".

=== The Ultrasounds ===
The Ultrasounds are an all-male a cappella group from the medical school of the University of Oxford. They formed in 2010 and made their competitive debut at The Voice Festival UK 2012 in the Oxford regional heat, where they won 'Outstanding Performance' and 'Vocal Percussion' awards.

== Royal Holloway, University of London ==
=== Absolute Harmony ===
Absolute Harmony are a mixed-voice a cappella group formed in 1997 at Royal Holloway, University of London as 'Alternative Harmony' by Regina Yau, who did not feel there was much opportunity for the average student to sing in an informal, unauditioned choir. After the group disintegrated somewhat due to Yau taking a year abroad, she returned, influenced by several American collegiate a cappella groups and decided to convert the group into an a cappella group, with a smaller group of members meeting more often to form 'Absolute Harmony'. The group was instrumental in the inauguration of the first ever British Inter-collegiate Contemporary Championship of A Cappella (BICCAs).

Eventually the name of the entire group changed to 'Absolute Harmony', with a smaller group, 'Hardcore Harmony', meeting more regularly to work towards competitions.

== University of St Andrews ==
=== The Other Guys ===
The Other Guys were formed in 2004 and are the only all-male a cappella group from the University of St Andrews. They are perhaps best known for their YouTube hit "Royal Romance", a tribute to the wedding of Prince William and Catherine Middleton, which gained recognition in the rest of the United Kingdom, the United States, Australia, and India within a week, and the video also appeared on "Webtastic" on The Today Show.

The group entered the International Championship of Collegiate A Cappella for the first time in 2007, when St Andrews hosted the Western European quarterfinal, and progressed to the semifinal in London. They repeated this success in the following year. The group went on to recreate the same double success in 2024 and 2025 where they won their quarterfinal's again. In 2024, the group placed second in the UK, losing out on the top spot to The Northern Lights. In 2009 they progressed to the London final of the inaugural Voice Festival UK competition. The group came third in the ICCA 2025 UK semi-final.

=== The Alleycats ===
The Alleycats are a mixed-voice a cappella choir. They appeared on the BBC's Last Choir Standing in 2008, making it to the final fifteen.

In 2009 and 2010, the group progressed to the final of the Voice Festival UK in London. In 2009, Lizzy Weintz won the award for 'Outstanding Arrangement' in the final. In 2010, the group received the 'Outstanding Performance' award.

=== The Accidentals ===
The Accidentals are an all-female a cappella group.

In 2010 they progressed from the St Andrews semifinal of the Voice Festival UK to the London final having won the award for 'Outstanding Performance'. In 2011 they achieved this success again, with Anna McDonald winning the award for 'Outstanding Soloist' for her performance of Adele's "Rolling in the Deep" and Ellie Mason winning the award for 'Outstanding Vocal Percussion' at the semifinal. In the final, the group were highly commended for their arrangement of "Price Tag", as well as their Vocal Percussion.

They came third at the ICCA UK semifinal in 2015, second at the ICCA Edinburgh quarterfinal in 2027, and third at the ICCA Edinburgh quarterfinal in 2018.

=== St Andrews Madrigal Group ===
The St Andrews Madrigal Group were formed in 1946. The auditioned choir of sixteen sings madrigals as well as contemporary 'choral' a capella by the likes of Eric Whitacre, Paul Mealor etc. In addition the group has for many decades sung choral arrangements of popular music, long before this style underwent something of a renaissance in the mid to late 1990s.

== University of Warwick ==
=== The Leamingtones ===
The Leamingtones are a group from the University of Warwick. They won their ICCA quarter-final in 2023, with group member Georgie Lagden also being awarded 'Outstanding Soloist'. They repeated both of these in 2024, with George Collier also picking up 'Outstanding Arrangement'. The same year, they were placed second in the Open A cappella Competition and were awarded the prize for 'Exceptional Arrangement'. In 2025, they came second in the ICCA UK semi-final after winning their quarter-final, with George Collier winning the 'Outstanding Arrangement' prize in both the semi-final and the quarter-final.

=== Offscore ===
Offscore are another group from the University of Warwick. They placed third in their ICCA 2025 quarter-final, with Dheekshitha Sankar winning 'Outstanding Soloist'.
