= The Other Guy =

The Other Guy or The Other Guys may refer to:

- "The Other Guy" (song), 1982 single by Little River Band
- The Other Guy (TV series), a 2017 Australian television series
- "The Other Guy"' song from the B2K album Pandemonium!
- The Other Guys, 2010 film
- The Other Guys (University of St Andrews), an a cappella group from the University of St Andrews
- "The Other Guys" (Stargate SG-1), episode from the sixth season of Stargate SG-1

== See also ==
- Some Other Guy, a song performed by The Beatles
- "Chuck Versus the Other Guy", the 13th episode of Chuck
