= The Naked Choir =

British television series

- Also known as: The Naked Choir with Gareth Malone; The Naked Choir
- Presented by: Gareth Malone
- Composer: Theo Vidgen
- Country of origin: United Kingdom
- No. of seasons: 1
- No. of episodes: 6

Production
- Producer: Gareth Malone
- Running time: 59 minutes
- Production company: Twenty Twenty Productions

Original release
- Network: BBC Two
- Release: 22 September – 27 October 2015

The Naked Choir is a BBC Two television series broadcast from 22 September to 27 October 2015. Presented by choirmaster Gareth Malone, the show featured eight a cappella groups competing to be chosen as the UK's best.

== Production ==
Plans for the show were first revealed in April 2015. Four hundred choirs auditioned to take part and eight were chosen for the televised programmes, which began their broadcast on 22 September 2015.

On 22 September four choirs from the south of the UK competed against one another in front of a live audience in Greenwich, London. One of them was eliminated at that stage, chosen by a jury of music experts. On 29 September four choirs from the north of the UK competed, again with one being eliminated. In each of the subsequent weeks one of the remaining choirs was eliminated until three remained to compete in the final.

At the semi-final stage, the four remaining choirs – Choral Stimulation, Restless Symphony, The Sons of Pitches and The Stratford East Singers – were challenged to film their performance to make a viral internet hit. Restless Symphony came fourth and failed to reach the final.

The final, broadcast on 27 October, was won by Birmingham based choir The Sons of Pitches, who sang a medley of three songs – Toxic by Britney Spears, Annie's Song by John Denver and Waiting All Night by Rudimental.

The Gareth Malone series Best in Britain broadcast the following year, in October 2016, featured groups from all disciplines as opposed to just a cappella. Even so, it was won by another a cappella group, Semi-Toned.

== Series 1 ==
Series 1 featured 8 a cappella groups, split between two regions, the north and the south.

=== Groups ===
==== South ====
Spinnaker Chorus – a choir composed entirely of women from Portsmouth. They were eliminated in the heats for the groups from the South.

Gospel Essence – a group from Romford. They were eliminated in the fourth programme. They placed fifth overall.

Restless Symphony – a group of six students from Southampton. They were eliminated in the semi-finals, placing fourth overall.

The Stratford East Singers – a community choir from East London. They reached the final and came third.

==== North ====
Flight of the Phoenix – a recently formed mixed group of seven students aged 17–18 from Manchester. They were eliminated in the heats for the groups from the North.

Yesteryear – a group of fourteen men from Derby and Nottingham aged from 49 to 83 who had been performing together for 10 years at the time of the show. They qualified from their heat but were eliminated in the very next show, placing sixth overall.

Choral Stimulation – a mixed group of ten students studying at Glasgow University. They were eventually runners-up in the competition.

The Sons of Pitches – a group of six males who met while studying at the University of Birmingham. They had been together for one and a half years at the time of filming. They were the series winners.

== Ratings ==
Episode no.	Airdate	Total viewers	Weekly ranking BBC Two
The Naked Choir
1	22 September 2015	2,830,000	2
2	29 September 2015	2,350,000	5
3	6 October 2015	2,140,000	11
4	13 October 2015	2,060,000	12
5	20 October 2015	2,070,000	8
6	27 October 2015	2,450,000	4

== See also ==
- The Choir (TV series)
- List of university a cappella groups in the United Kingdom
