= The Oxford Belles =

English university a cappella group

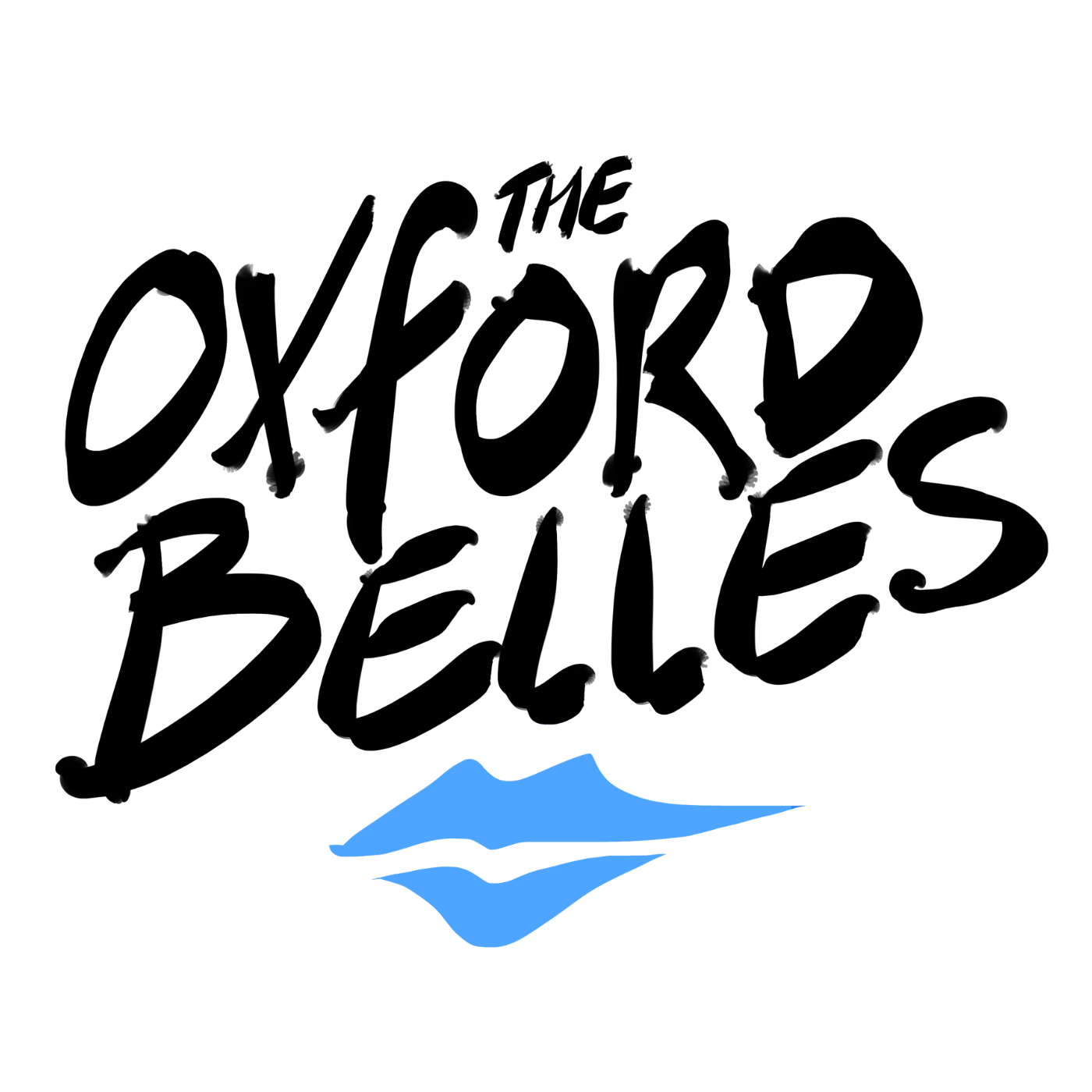

Background information
- Origin: Oxford
- Genres: A cappella
- Years active: 1995–present
- Website: oxfordbelles.com

The Oxford Belles are an all-female and non-binary a cappella group from The University of Oxford and Oxford Brookes University. The group performs on a regular basis in and around Oxford and London, primarily at balls and charity events, occasionally with other Oxford University a cappella groups such as The Oxford Gargoyles and Out of the Blue.

== History ==
The Belles were formed in 1995 by Helen Whiteley, a year-long visiting student from the University of Virginia, who had previously sung with The Virginia Belles. Helen was eager to continue the a cappella tradition, hugely popular in the US, on the east side of the Atlantic.

In the 2008 quarterfinals of the International Championship of Collegiate A Cappella, the Belles were awarded prizes for Best Choreography (for their rendition of Blondie's "One Way Or Another"), and Lauren Bensted was awarded the prize for Best Arrangement. In the semi-finals, Joanna Langilie's solo in "One Way Or Another" was highly commended. In 2009, the Belles reached the final of The Voice Festival UK (VF-UK), which established them for that year as the most successful all-female a cappella group in the UK.

== Reviews ==
In 2001, The Oxford Belles performed at Marie Curie House in Edinburgh, where they received a positive review in The Scotsman, performing a programme of "unlikely bedfellows" including the Bangles, Beatles, Van Morrison, and TLC. According to James Mullighan, "Their blend of sweet, simple a cappella pop is engaging".

Their 2010 performance at Edinburgh Fringe received a more measured review in ScotsGay magazine which stated, "Though their act was wobbly at times, the Oxford Belles gave a charming and talented performance, and with a few tweaks to their act, could be fantastic."

In 2017, the Belles received recognition for the International Women's Day cover of "Girls Just Wanna Have Fun", with a review in Mashable suggesting, "this feminist reboot by The Oxford Belles could give [Cyndi] Lauper a run for her money".

== Members ==
- Hilary Yu (New) (Co-President)
- Chloe Cameron (Linacre) (Co-President)
- Faith Caswell (Regent's) (Musical Director)
- Evie Gilder (St John's) (Treasurer)
- Ania Savage (New)
- Bella Cox (Merton)
- Eugenie Ng (St Catherine's)
- Isabelle Reaney-McElvanney (Christ Church)
- Rhiannon Green
- Thaejus Ilango (St John's)
- Venisha Nembang (Corpus Christi)
- Vrinda Mahtani (Jesus)
