= The Sons of Pitches =

British a cappella vocal group

The Sons of Pitches are a British vocal group who specialize in a cappella and beatbox. They won the BBC 2 television series, The Naked Choir, in 2015 with six members, Joe Novelli, Joe Hinds, Joe Belham, Jamie Hughes, Josh Mallett and Midé Adenaike.

The Sons of Pitches were formed in 2010 when they were all studying at the University of Birmingham. The three Joes are known amongst the group as Novs, Bells and Hinds. Jamie Hughes left the group in 2019 to pursue a career outside of music.

The group had their cover of Skrillex’s Scary Monsters and Nice Sprites selected for Sing 12, the Contemporary A Cappella Society Association’s compilation CD.

Following their success on The Naked Choir, in 2016 they embarked on a 26-date tour of the UK. They toured the UK with a new stage show in 2017, celebrating the world of television. They have performed in the USA and Asia as well as at the International Championship of Collegiate A Cappella Final in New York, the Hong Kong International A Cappella Festival, the Edinburgh Fringe Festival. They then toured across the UK again in 2018, where they celebrated music by singing 100 number one hits throughout the decades, including ABBA, George Ezra, and many more, and again in 2019, where they celebrated songs from across the globe and performed their own song "Pelu Mi" sung by Midé, who normally performs the groups beatboxing. And to celebrate 10 years of the Sons of Pitches, they started a tour in 2023 celebrating their "best bits" over their time performing.

They were unable to tour between 2020-2022 due to COVID-19 restrictions in the UK, but still put together covers to post on their YouTube channel.
