= Semi-Toned =

British all-male a cappella group

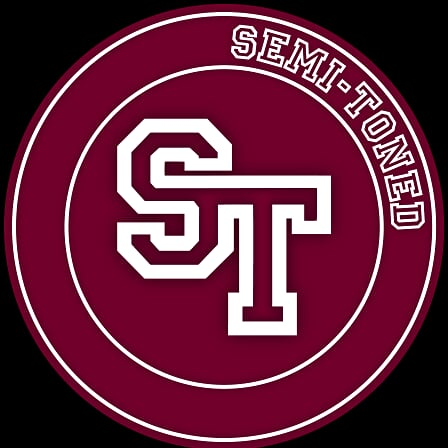

Background information
- Origin: University of Exeter
- Genre: A cappella
- Years active: 2010–present
- Members: Alexander Prince - President; Dan Taviansky - Musical Director; Nick Platt - Business Manager; Tom Brown - Publicity Manager; Joshua Nyoni; Christopher Lumb; Josh Parker
- Past members: Eddie Henley; Simon Eaton; Jack Telfer-St-Claire; Jon Minter; Sean Li; Ed Jillings; Joe Lane; Theo Cowper; Johnny Wood; Ben Dale; Jamie Blencowe; Ben Street; Adam Carpenter; Michael Luya; Ed Scott; Ashley Waters; Rob Cross; Michael Sole; Alex Deakin; Satchit Srikanth; Tom Broadbent; Duncan Payne; Sylvan Rackham; Ted Bartram; Robert Akerele-Miles; Charlie Rockall; Tommy Hamer; Henry Edwards; Sam Harper; Greg Munday; Ludo Graham; Alfie Davies; Chad St Louis; Will Sharpe-Neal; Djantai Otorbaev; Jacob Storey; Ryan Land; Max Weeden; Rupert Cole; Matt Vine; Chris Mott; Tom Bryan-Isaacs; Anthony Yammine; Jacob Westbrook; Ollie Baker; Rhys Woolmer; Oliver Hopkins; Ludo Palazzo; Fergus Cooper; Ed Baines

Semi-Toned is a British all-male A cappella group from the University of Exeter, in the United Kingdom who sing a variety of modern and classic songs. They were formed in October 2010 originally as a barbershop quintet, before establishing themselves as a twelve-man contemporary group with a wide range of repertoire dedicated to developing their musical abilities whilst sharing a passion for singing and performing. They became more well known after multiple TV and radio appearances on shows such as 'The Choir: Gareth's Best in Britain' (BBC2) and 'Sing: Ultimate A Cappella' (Sky One), as well as singing on BBC Radio 2 with Rylan Clarke-Neal during his 'Great Ka-Ry-oke Challenge' in support of BBC Children in Need 2019. They now regularly tour both the UK and US, as well as performing annually at the Edinburgh Fringe Festival and frequently releasing albums and music videos.

== History ==
=== 2010–2013: The early years ===
The university's first all-male a cappella group was formed when Eddie Henley, Simon Eaton, and Jon Minter met after a Chapel Choir rehearsal. Initially the group sang a collection of old barbershop classics in a much more formal style. After expanding to ten members the following year, Semi-Toned initiated the move away from barbershop into a modern collegiate A Cappella style. They competed for the first time in The Voice Festival UK in 2012, the UK Collegiate A Cappella competition winning both "Outstanding Arrangement" and "Outstanding Vocal Percussion". In 2013 the group won the South West regional where they were awarded "Outstanding Stagecraft and Choreography" and, once more, "Outstanding Vocal Percussion", before advancing to the London semi-final. Semi-Toned made their Edinburgh Festival Fringe debut in 2013 with their show, "The Exe-Men", which received a five-star review from Broadway Baby.

=== 2014–2015: Voice Festival success and first US tour ===
In 2014, the group reached the final of The Voice Festival UK and won awards for "Outstanding Arrangement" for their mash-up of "Dear Darlin'" by Olly Murs and "The Fox (What Does The Fox Say?)" by Ylvis, "Outstanding Overall Performance" and "Outstanding Soloist" for Michael Luya in "Motion Picture Soundtrack" by Radiohead. They then continued their Edinburgh Festival Fringe success with 2014's "Toned Up!" which saw a second five-star review from Broadway Baby and a prestigious "Bobby" Award, the group becoming the first University ensemble and first A cappella group to achieve this. In September the group recorded its first self-titled 5 track EP with The Vocal Company, featuring covers of John Newman, Daft Punk, Paolo Nutini, Kanye West, Jay Z and Radiohead and was released in early 2015.

In January 2015 for the first time, Semi-Toned competed in the Semi-Finals of the ICCA's in London, finishing in second place overall, whilst winning "Outstanding Choreography". In April, Semi-Toned won The Voice Festival UK as well as "Outstanding Overall Performance". Soon after they embarked on their first tour of the East Coast of the United States, visiting and performing with groups from Colombia, NYU, Princeton, Yale and North Eastern Colleges. In August, Semi-Toned performed for the third year running at the Edinburgh Festival Fringe with their show "Game of Tones". Just before this, they released their first professional music video, a mash-up arrangement of "If I Were A Rich Man" from Fiddler on the Roof and "Rich Girl" by Gwen Stefani which amassed over 230,000 views on YouTube and reached the front page of internet news site BuzzFeed. In 2016 the video was nominated in the Contemporary A cappella Recording Awards for Best Scholastic Video.

=== 2016: Sing Theory and The Choir: Gareth's Best in Britain ===
In 2016, Semi-Toned won the Quarter-Finals of the ICCA's held in Exeter, competing against other UK A cappella groups before finishing second at the Semi-Finals in London behind eventual World Champions The Techtonics. At the same time, Semi-Toned released its second 6 track EP "Sing Theory" with Liquid Fifth with covers of Fleetwood Mac, Regina Spektor, Frank Ocean, Beyoncé and a mashup of Jungle and Chic. The group at the end of March embarked upon their second tour of the United States, this time performing a 90 minute long show in large venues and travelling over three weeks along the east coast from Florida to Connecticut, including an appearance at Virginia Arts Festival.

Through the Summer of 2016, Semi-Toned participated in Gareth Malone's BBC2 program "The Choir: Gareth's Best in Britain" which was aired in November–December 2016. After competing with groups from all over the country, on 6 December Semi-Toned was named as Gareth's Best Choir in Britain during the final in Westminster Central Hall.

=== 2017–18: Music video releases and Sing: Ultimate A Cappella ===
Shortly after winning The Choir: Gareth's Best in Britain in December 2016 Semi-Toned released their second music video, a charity fundraiser version of their Christmas Medley entitled 'A Very Semi-Toned Christmas', in support of the Order of Malta Volunteers. In January 2017 they released a third video, their cover of Beyoncé's '7/11' which was a track on their 2016 EP 'Sing Theory'. After this they toured the US for a third time with their show of the same name, travelling across the Midwest and Western States, culminating in Richmond, KY.

During the summer of 2017, Semi-Toned were invited to take part in the recording of a new Sky One television show, entitled Sing: Ultimate A Cappella, hosted by Cat Deeley. Filming took place throughout the summer, with the first episode airing on 6 October 2017. Semi-Toned came top of their heat, narrowly beating rival group Elle & The Pocket Belles with their performance of 'The Chain' by Fleetwood Mac to qualify for a place in the final episode. The final aired on 10 November 2017, in which Semi-Toned performed 'Careless Whisper' by George Michael and 'Don't Stop Me Now' by Queen. After their second performance, they were eliminated from the competition.

Semi-Toned released another Christmas music video in December 2018; their cover of Wizzard's "I Wish It Could Be Christmas Everyday".

=== 2020–2021: Semi-Toned during a pandemic ===
After the music industry was significantly hit as a result of the COVID-19 pandemic, music gigs and performances were cancelled all across the UK forcing Semi-Toned to cancel their fourth U.S. tour. This has led to an increase in the use of social media to promote and share performers' musical abilities from the safety of their own homes. Semi-Toned have followed suit by posting music videos on their own social medias of Instagram, Facebook and YouTube to maintain interest in their group. The A Cappella group have been able to perform in online music festivals and gigs to promote their work.

=== 2022–2024: Semi-Toned after the pandemic ===
In March 2022, Semi-Toned placed second in the ICCA Semi-Finals in London scoring one of the highest Semi-Finals scores in ICCA history.

== Discography ==
=== EPs ===
- Semi-Toned (2015)
- Sing Theory (2016)
- Strike Three (2018)
- Infrared (2020)

Sing Theory and Strike Three were review by the Recorded A Cappella Review Board (RARB), scoring 4.7/5 and 4/5 stars respectively.

=== Singles ===
- A Very Semi-Toned Christmas (2016)
- Candle in the Wind (2017)
- Sober (2019)

Candle in the Wind was also reviewed by RARB, and received a 5/5 star rating from reviewer Dom Otto Asís.

== Edinburgh Fringe Shows ==
Semi-Toned have consistently performed at the Edinburgh Fringe Festival since their debut in 2013. They hold the record for the most sell-out shows of any university a cappella group at the festival, as well as the highest number of five-star ratings from BroadwayBaby. Their performances have included a diverse array of musical styles and themes and are listed below;

- "The Exe Men" (2013)
- "Toned Up" (2014)
- "Game of Tones" (2015)
- "Sing Theory" (2016)
- "Stay Tuned" (2017)
- "Strike Three" (2018)
- "Life on Mars" (2019)
- "A Study in Burgundy" (2021)
- "Lost in Time” (2022)
- "Castaway" (2023)

In 2014, "Toned Up" also received the Broadway Baby Bobby Award, the rare and highly prized accolade of the Edinburgh Fringe.

== Tours ==
The group have conducted four tours of the US and one tour of the UK. The first tour, in 2015, was managed by the group. The three successive tours of the US (2016–18) were jointly planned and undertaken by Semi-Toned and Arts Management Associates. Semi-Toned took a break from the US to conduct their first tour of the United Kingdom in 2019. Their 2020 tour, planned for the US, was cancelled due to the Coronavirus pandemic.

Semi-Toned Tours
Tour Name	Year	Locations	Tour Manager
Semi-Toned	2015	New York, NY - Boston, MA - Cambridge, MA - Washington, DC	Tommy Hamer
Semi-Toned: Game of Tones	2016	Tallahassee, FL - Miami, FL - Raleigh, NC - Norfolk, VA - Allentown, PA - Danbury, CT - Valhalla, NY	Tommy Hamer
Semi-Toned: Sing Theory	2017	Kerville, TX - Medford, OR - Bend, OR - Yountville, CA - Lancaster, CA - Las Vegas, NV - Cedar City, UT - Ames, IA - Hopkinsville, KY - Richmond, KY	Henry Edwards
Semi-Toned: Season Three	2018	Delray Beach, FL - Venice, FL - Troy, AL - Beaufort, SC - Aiken, SC - Norfolk, VA - Scranton, PA - Valhalla, NY - Rockville Center, NY	Alfie Davies
Semi-Toned: Homecoming	2019	Grantham, UK - Hereford, UK - Monmouth, UK - London, UK - Reading, UK - Guildford, UK - Brighton, UK	Max Weeden
