= The Other Guys (University of St Andrews) =

Scottish all-male a cappella group

- Also known as: TOG
- Origin: St Andrews, Scotland
- Genre: A cappella
- Years active: 2004–present
- Members: Ben Hayes; Joseph Hall; Charlie Tavolato; Arthur Fink; Ian Crews; Harry Stuart; Harry Aspinall; Corban Goodsell; Sam Flores; Ollie Casey; Caleb Hickling

The Other Guys (TOG) are an all-male a cappella ensemble from the University of St Andrews, Scotland and only group to win the Scottish A Cappella Championships (SACC) for three consecutive years from 2022-24. The group was founded in 2004 and has been one of the groups responsible for the rise of collegiate a cappella in Scotland.

The group uploads their musical parody videos, to YouTube, including "Royal Romance", a tribute to the wedding of Prince William and Catherine Middleton based upon Lady Gaga's "Bad Romance", and their follow-up video "St Andrews Girls", a cover of Katy Perry's "California Gurls", which was released in conjunction with a charity single raising money for Breast Cancer Care. Other music videos include charity single "It's Raining Men (2014)" and "Holding Out for a Hero (2024)". The group competes nationally and has travelled internationally on several tours.

== History ==
=== 2004–08: Formation and early years ===
The group was founded in 2004 by a group of friends who wanted to bring the American tradition of collegiate a cappella to the university. In the spring of 2005, the newly founded group went on its first international tour to the United States singing in New York City for the University Glee Club of New York City and in Westport, Connecticut at the Java Jam - a concert of American Collegiate A Cappella Groups at Greens Farms Academy. After three years spent increasing their reputation in both St. Andrews and Scotland, they released their debut album, Indecent Exposure in May 2007, which included covers of tracks by Seal, Backstreet Boys and Chris DeBurgh.

In the winter of 2007, St Andrews hosted the quarter-finals of the International Championship of Collegiate A Cappella (ICCAs) for the first time. The Other Guys went on to win this regional round and progressed to the Western European Final in London.

On 12 May 2008, the group released their second studio album The Damage is Done, which included a mash-up of two Scouting For Girls tracks, "Elvis Ain't Dead" and "She's So Lovely", and a rewritten version of "Gangsta's Paradise" which was renamed "Golfer's Paradise", referring to the status of St. Andrews as the 'Home of Golf'. A rewritten version of the latter is also present on their fourth album, Barely Regal.

The Other Guys won the ICCA quarter-final again in 2008, where David Borowsky was awarded 'Outstanding Vocal Percussionist' at both the St Andrews quarter-final and the resulting Western European Final, Rory Feilen also won 'Outstanding Choreography' for the group's rendition of 'Bye Bye Bye Me a River' at the quarterfinal.

=== 2009–10 ===
Following the formation of The Voice Festival UK (VF-UK) in 2009, The Other Guys proceeded to compete in one of the three semi-finals on 7 March 2009 in St. Andrews. Tenor David Borowsky won the award for 'Outstanding Solo' for the performance of "Desperado", and the group went through to the London final, where Borowsky went on to win the 'Outstanding Solo' award once again.

On 1 May 2009, the group released their third studio album, entitled Well Sung. This incorporated for the first time a guest vocalist and several well-known hymns, including "Amazing Grace" and "Auld Lang Syne". The album was launched in a special performance at Younger Hall in St Andrews, and was well received throughout the university and by Rector Kevin Dunion.

On 6 March 2010, the group entered the Voice Festival UK for the second time, where bass Iain Glen won the 'Outstanding Arrangement' for his arrangement of Sara Bareilles' "Gravity".

=== 2011 ===
The Other Guys at the Voice Festival UK 2011 in Younger Hall, St Andrews

The following year, on 4 March 2011, the group entered the VFUK competition for the third time. There were now five semi-finals and as such, the number of groups qualifying from each semi-final was reduced from two to one. The Other Guys won awards for 'Outstanding Musicality', 'Outstanding Arrangement' for their performance of "Royal Romance", and tenor Henry Synge was 'Highly Commended' for his solo on "Kiss From A Rose.

Filming and recording on their video "Royal Romance" began in March 2011. It was cut and edited at the beginning of April and was released onto YouTube on 11 April 2011, to celebrate the Royal Wedding and to 'put a smile on people's faces'. Within a week, the video had earned recognition in the United Kingdom, the United States, Australia, and India. The group made their first TV appearance in a report on Five News on 14 April 2011 and later on STV News. The video was also featured on The Today Show in America as part of their 'Webtastic' section.

After the success of the video in St Andrews in particular, the group were invited by Louise Richardson, the Principal and Vice-Chancellor of the university, to perform at the Principal's Awards Dinner at Lower College Hall on Wednesday 20 April. Their first public performance post-video was in the Byre Theatre bar, where they performed a set of eleven songs, including "Royal Romance", some of which involved several former members of the group.

Promotional Teaser for the "Royal Romance" video

The group performed three times in St Salvator's Quadrangle in St Andrews on Friday 29 April 2011 as part of the celebrations of the Royal Wedding of Prince William and Kate Middleton. Each time they performed "Royal Romance" along with other songs from their repertoire, including "Canned Heat" and "Kiss From A Rose", the other two songs from their set at the VF-UK Semi Final. They also appeared on ITV's morning show Daybreak.

After the success of "Royal Romance", the group embarked upon several charitable endeavours, both just as a group and as part of various charity fundraisers. The group have twice appeared at fundraisers for the Muir Maxwell Trust, firstly on 3 July at Fettes College, Edinburgh as part of their Mad Hatter's Tea Party, and the second time on 10 December at the Savoy Hotel.

Recording for their fourth album, Barely Regal began on 27 June 2011 and was completed on 7 July. The album was released on 5 September, alongside an EP of their 2009 album, Well Sung, which featured six of the tracks from the original album. The group worked with American professional a cappella group Overboard, who did the mixing and editing, and music producers Diovoce, who mastered the album. The group also announced that a 'significant proportion of any profits made' were to be donated to the scholarship at the University of St Andrews that was set up in dedication to William and Kate.

Following a performance at the Alfred Dunhill Links Championship Gala Dinner on 1 October 2011, they were invited by professional golfer Colin Montgomerie to sing at a fundraiser for his own charity, Maggie's Cancer Care.

=== 2012 ===
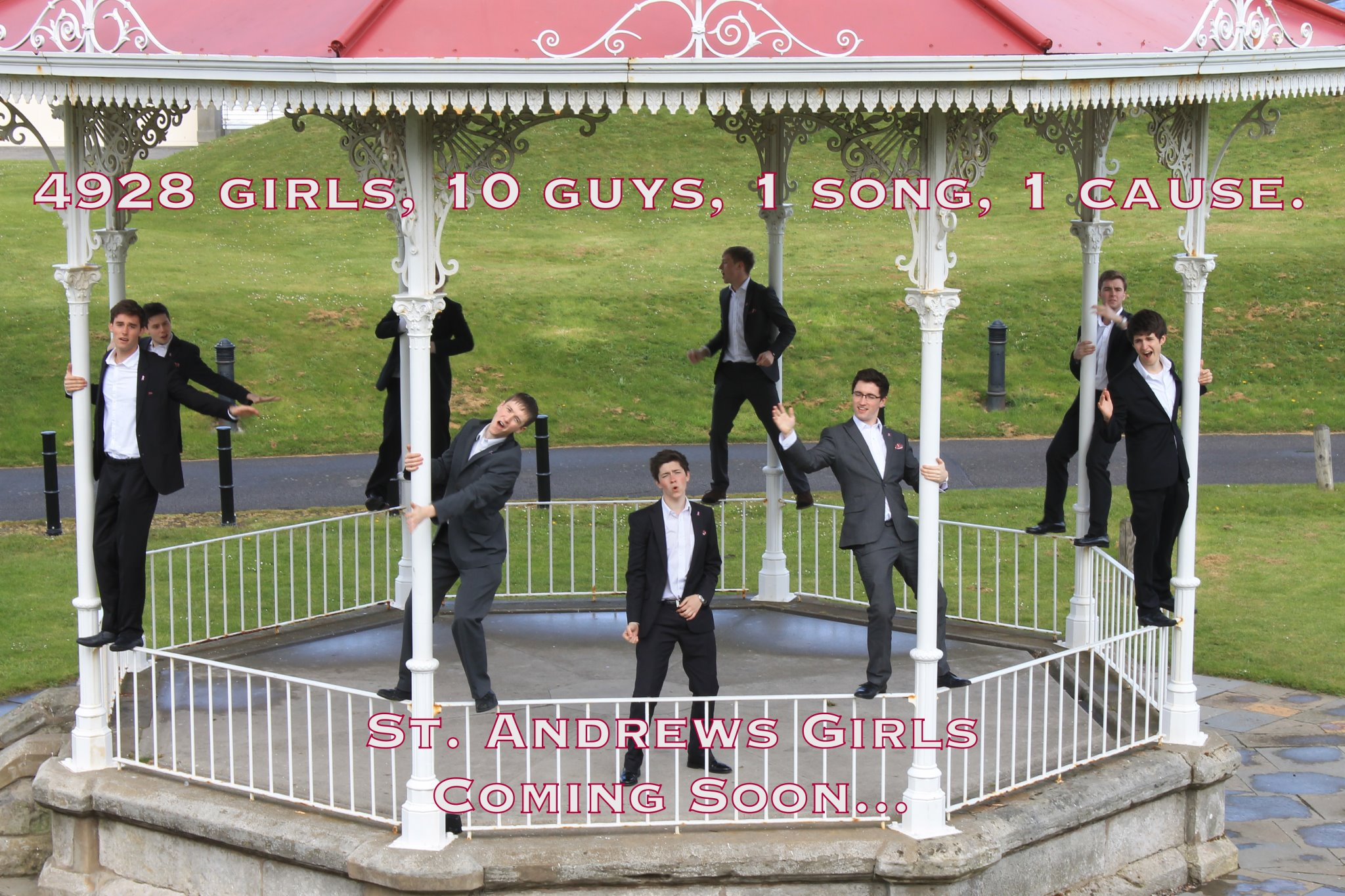
Promotional Teaser for the "St Andrews Girls" charity single and video

On 3 March 2012, the group competed for the fourth time in The Voice Festival UK, entering the St Andrews Regional Round. The group won the round, as well as the award for 'Outstanding Performance', and progressed to the final in London, where they won the award for 'Outstanding Arrangement' for their song 'Skinny Love'. Shortly afterwards, the group performed for the English National Ballet at their annual Gala Fundraiser held in The Dorchester. Pictures of the performance were published in Tatler.

In April 2012 the group revealed plans for their latest project, a charity video and single in aid of Breast Cancer Care entitled "St Andrews Girls". As part of the filming process, the group invited girls from St Andrews to be a part of the video during a special day of recording in St Salvator's Quad, St Andrews, on 22 April 2012. The single was released onto YouTube on 15 May 2012.

The group went on tour between 10 and 15 July, performing in several venues in Nottingham, Oxford and London, including The Half Moon in Putney.

The group's Christmas EP, entitled The Other Guys' Christmas was released on 26 November 2012, and contained 8 tracks, including an original, entitled "Christmas Gets Worse Every Year", written and arranged by friend of the group, Oscar Foxley. As of 12 January 2013, the song had peaked at number 2 on the Amazon.com Bestsellers Chart, had amassed over 130,000 views on YouTube, and had attracted media attention on Classic FM, and BBC Reporting Scotland. In the first week the song was eligible for the Official Charts, it reached number 9 on the independent chart and number 32 on the Scottish charts.

=== 2013 ===
In early 2013 the group revealed plans to release an EP especially for Valentine's Day. The album, entitled Just For You, was released on 5 February. A week later, the group released another video onto YouTube, "I Only Bought You Flowers Because I Love You So".

On 23 February, the group once again took part in the St Andrews Regional of the Voice Festival UK, winning the award for 'Outstanding Musicality'. On 16 August, the group took their first ever show to the Edinburgh Festival Fringe, performing their "One Night Stand" at Greyfriars Kirk. In November, the University of St Andrews commissioned Oscar Foxley to write a song in commemoration of the university's 600th anniversary celebrations. The song, entitled "St Andrean Skies", débuted at an honorary graduation dinner attended by Hillary Clinton and Scottish First Minister Alex Salmond.

=== 2014 ===
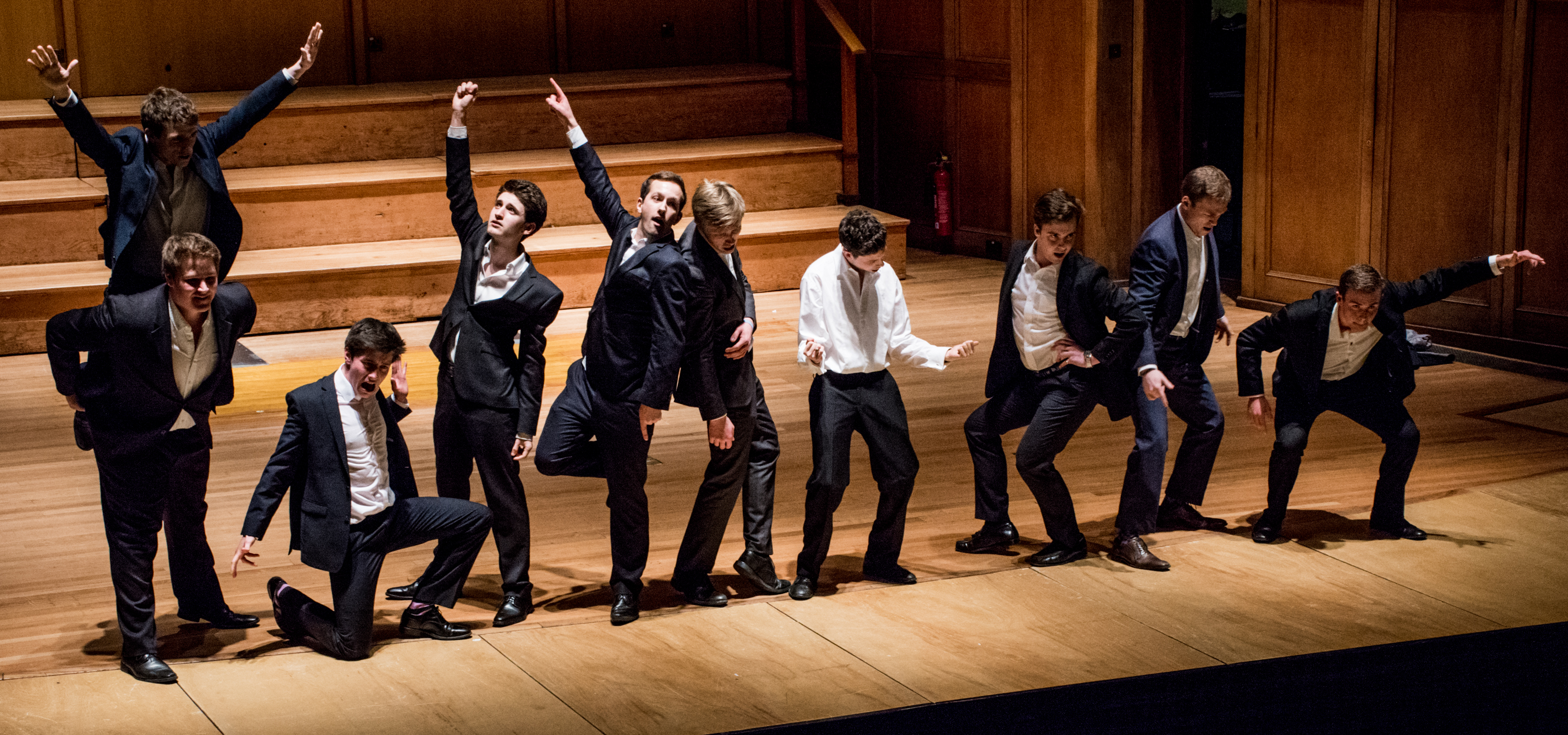
The Other Guys performing Ignition (Remix) at the Scottish A Cappella Championships in April 2014.

In January 2014, the group embarked on a tour of the East Coast of the United States to celebrate their 10th anniversary. They travelled to New York City on 9 January and performed in the Alice Tully Hall at the Lincoln Center for the Performing Arts on 11 January with the University Glee Club of New York City. They then moved onto Boston where they performed at several high schools and colleges.

On 18 April 2014, the group took part in the inaugural Scottish A Cappella Championships (SACC), held in place of the St Andrews Regional of the Voice Festival UK. The group placed first with 405 points ahead of The Alleycats and The Accidentals and became the first outright champions of Scottish collegiate a cappella. Richard Phillips also won the award for 'Outstanding Vocal Percussion' for the group's rendition of Coldplay's "Fix You".

In August 2014, The Other Guys performed at the Edinburgh Fringe Festival for the second time. They embarked on a week-long run, with fourteen performances in six days, which sold out.

On the back of this success, The Other Guys released their seventh studio album, 10, named in honour of their tenth anniversary that year. This release was followed up by a celebratory reunion, in which all manner of Other Guys returned to St Andrews for a weekend of a cappella, culminating in a gig at The Byre Theatre, St Andrews.

On 7 November 2014, The Other Guys released a cover of Run to You, originally by Pentatonix, which was accompanied by a music video. Proceeds from the single were donated to Help For Heroes. The single reached number three in the iTunes classical music charts on day of release.

=== 2015 ===
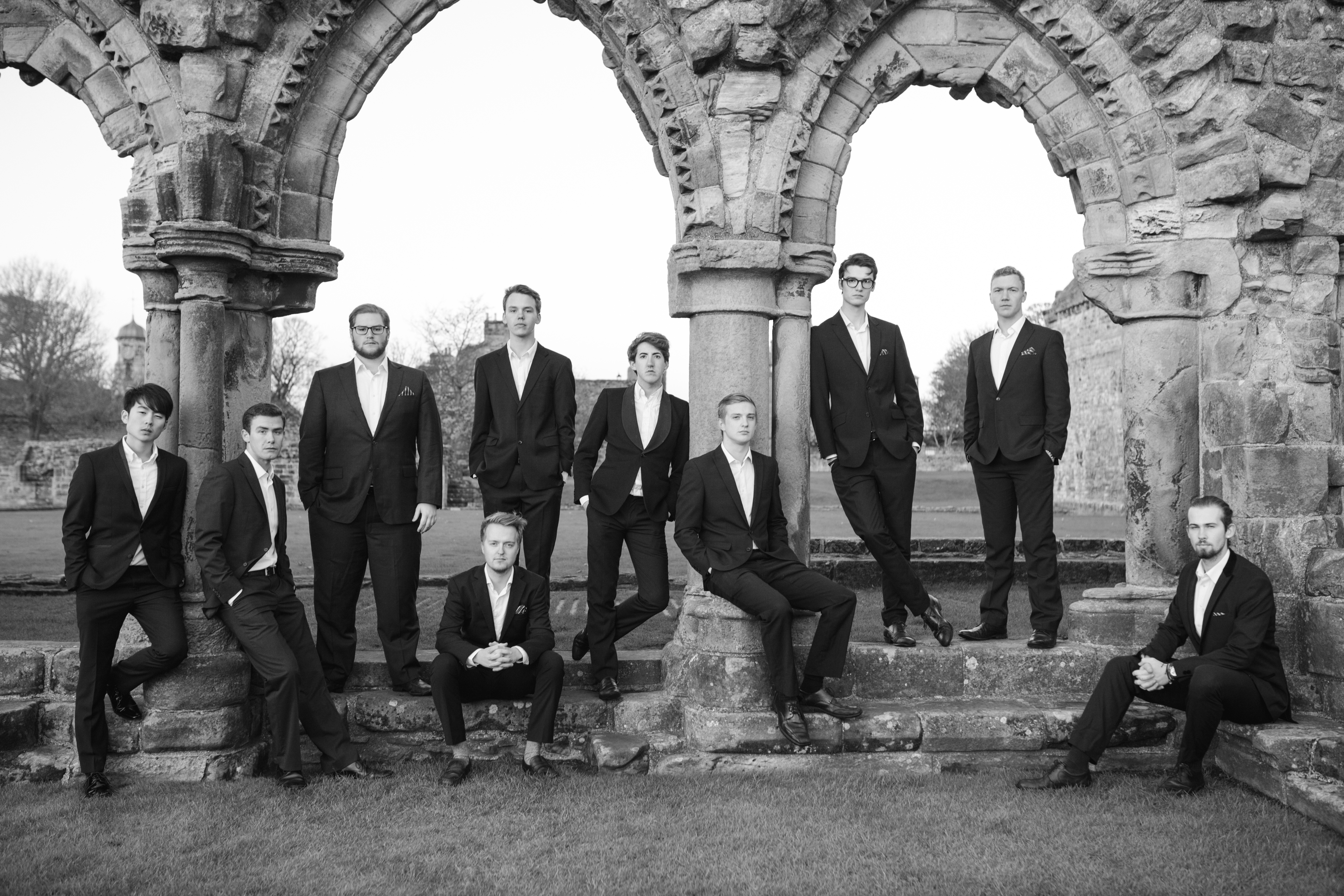
The Other Guys 2015/16

In January 2015, The Other Guys embarked on a ten-day tour of the South of England and Greater London, performing at a number of secondary schools in the region. The group also put on a concert at the Royal Ocean Racing Club on the Isle of Wight.

In May 2015, the group released its recent charity single and music video: It's Raining Men, in aid of Prostate Cancer UK. This single was first performed by the group at the Scottish A Cappella Championships 2015 on 5 March 2015 where they were awarded second place.

=== 2016 ===
In January 2016 the Guys toured LA, Dallas, Chicago, Boston, New York, DC and Toronto, as well as opening for acclaimed country vocal band, Home Free, at the Byre Theatre on their UK tour.

The Other Guys claimed second place at the 2016 edition of SACC with a performance inspired by Sia, OutKast and The Lord of the Rings soundtrack.

In May 2016, former Principal of the University of St Andrews, Professor Louise Richardson listed the group's viral parody song 'St Andrews Girls' as her first track on the BBC Radio 4 show 'Desert Island Discs'.

In August 2016 The Other Guys returned to the Edinburgh Fringe Festival for a week of performances with their show "Well Sung", named after the group's 2009 album. The show earned a 4-star-review.

=== 2017 ===
In August 2017, as part of the Edinburgh Fringe Festival, the Guys sold out all their shows.

In October 2017, the Guys hosted their first Ball, 'The Other Ball,' celebrated fourteen years of The Other Guys. This sold-out event was held in the Lower and Upper College Halls of St Salvator's Quadrangle at St Andrew's University. The event was described by the student website as 'flawlessly executed.'

=== 2018 ===
In January 2018, the Guys toured North America for three weeks. Starting in New York city, they performed across the East Coast (Philadelphia, Pennsylvania; New Haven, Connecticut; Washington D.C.; Richmond, Virginia and Chapel Hill, North Carolina) and in Toronto, Canada. As part of this tour they sang with groups at Yale University, Georgetown University and the University of Richmond as well as at various schools and performance venues.

In February they took part in the International Competition of Collegiate a Cappella and placed for the semi-finals in London. This took place in March 2018. On 4 July, the group released their new single, 24K Meghan (a parody of Bruno Mars' '24K Magic'), in honour of Meghan Markle and the 'special relationship' between the UK and US.

Following a successful tour, the group recorded and filmed their Christmas single of Fairytale of New York, featuring Amelia Poole, alluding to the nostalgic emotions that inevitably manifest themselves around the Christmas season.

=== 2019 ===
The Other Guys performed the first concert at St Michael and All Angels in Winterbourne Earls in aid of the fund to restore the St Michael’s church bells.

In December 2019, the group performed at Huawei's Charity Christmas Concert in support of the NSPCC. The group performed at the Royal Festival Hall, London alongside the Royal Philharmonic Orchestra and Russell Watson. In January 2020, the group embarked on their UK tour visiting cities across the country.

=== 2020 ===
The group visited Downside School in January 2020, where member of the group Felix Hobbs was an alumnus. The group helped raise money for the charity Netball For All an initiative in Malawi to support girls and young women through education, by providing them with the skills and confidence gained through sport.

In March 2020, the group took part in the Scottish A Capella Championships in Edinburgh, placing 2nd and winning the prize for best choreography.

=== 2021 ===
In October 2021, The Other Guys were asked to perform at an evening reception in connection with the COP 26 Summit in Glasgow, Scotland. The group performed 'What a Wonderful World','The Parting Glass', and 'Hey Ya!'. The music choice was described by the group as "a result of balancing entertainment and appropriateness".

In November 2021, the group performed at the sold out St Andrews' University Christmas Ball event where their performance was reported to have 'unsurprisingly' drawn the crowd from the main room to the marquee in which they performed.

=== 2022 ===
TOG competed in Aberdeen for the Scottish A Capella Championships (SACC). The group won SACC, achieving the title 'Scotland's Premiere A-Capella Group'. They also garnered prizes for best choreography, and best vocal percussion.

On the 11th February 2022, the group hosted their annual 'The Other Ball' at Lower College Hall. The group went on to perform at St Andrews' 'On The Rocks Festival' where they provided an 'Immersive concert experience'

In August, they returned to the Edinburgh Fringe Festival in a much larger venue.

On the 7th of October 2022 the group performed at The Byre Theatre on behalf of the Friends of the Byre, who they have subsequently collaborated with a number of times.

=== 2023 ===
The Other Guys defended their title at the Scottish A Capella Championships held in St Andrews, with only seven members. They also returned to the studio to record their 2023 competition set as an EP, "Seven is Heaven", released in October 2023.

In November the group performed again at Mermaids' Christmas Ball where they were noted for performing their arrangement of 'Music for a Sushi Restaurant' by Harry Styles.

The end of the year saw the group join composer and pianist, Alexis Ffrench, as a support act for the UK leg of his European tour, performing in Queen’s Hall (Edinburgh), and Theatre Royal Drury Lane (London).

=== 2024 ===
In 2024, The Other Guys returned to the International Championship of Collegiate A Cappella. They placed 2nd in the UK when they competed at the semifinal at the New Wimbledon Theatre on Saturday 30 March. The group also won at the 2024 Scottish A Cappella Championships for the third year running, hosted by University of Aberdeen A Cappella Society. The group's win at SACC 2024 further extended them as the most successful group in the history of the competition having won the competition a record 4 times since its inception in 2014.

2024 was also the twentieth anniversary of The Other Guys, and was marked by the release of the group's eighth studio album, XX, and charity single, 'Holding Out for a Hero'. The release weekend saw the return of a third of the group's alumni to a large-scale concert in Holy Trinity Church, followed by the group's annual ball, held at Lower College Hall.

The Other Guys featured on episode two of VRT’s ‘Niks Te Zien’ which aired on Belgian Television on May 16th 2024.

In September 2024 The Other Guys embarked on a short English tour. Performing at St Leonard’s Church Balderstone, Uppingham School, All Saints’ Church in Marlow and Fletching Parish Church. At Fletching, all proceeds were donated to support the Arrhythmogenic Cardiomyopathy Trust.

=== 2025 ===
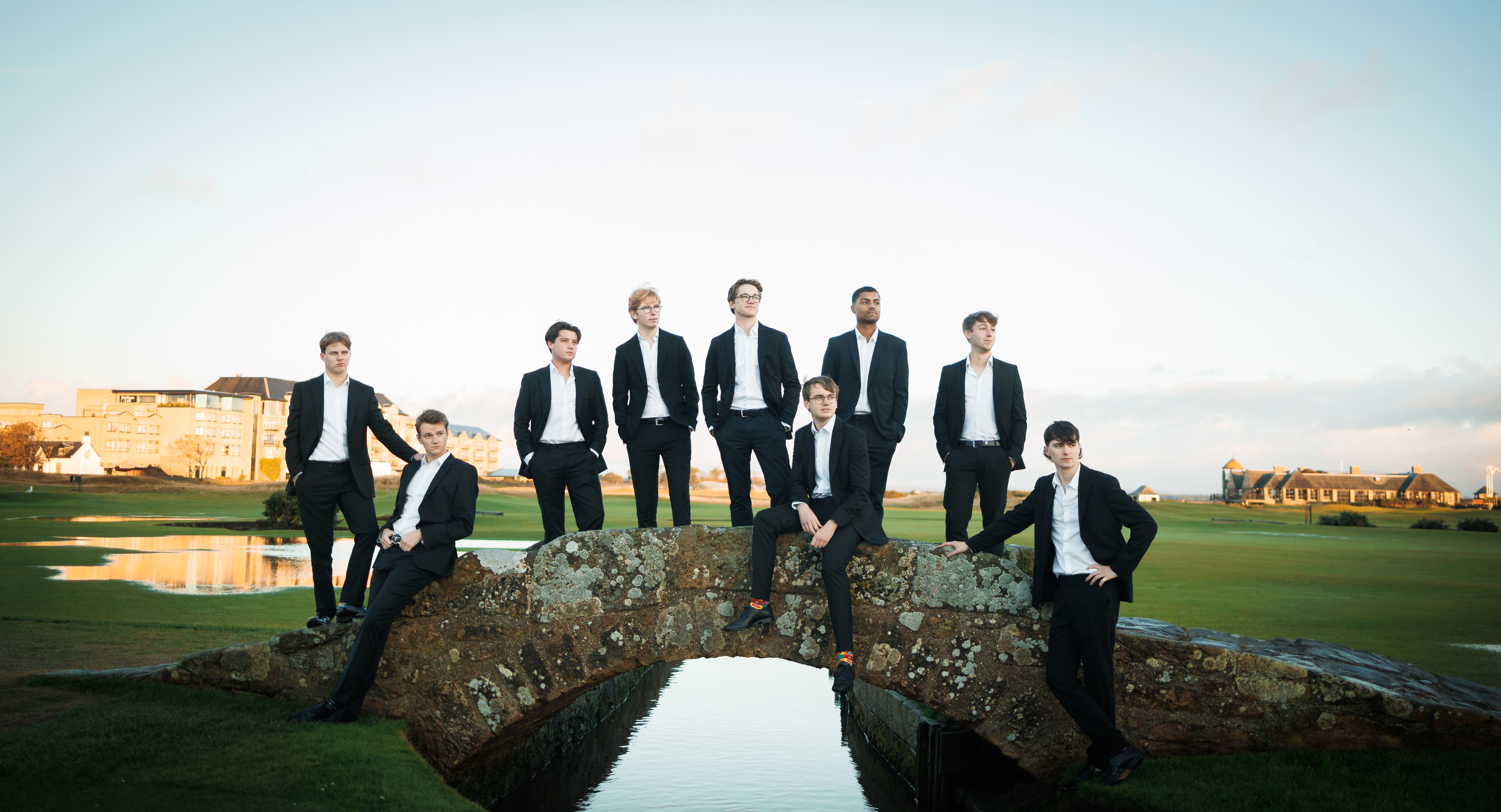
The Other Guys in 2025, pictured on the Old Course at St Andrews.

In January 2025, The Other Guys embarked on another short England tour, visiting two of the same churches as the previous tour, St Leonard's Church Balderstone and Fletching Parish Church, alongside All Saint's Church in Bisham. In Fletching the group raised nearly £4,000 to support the keeping of the church.

The group qualified again for the same ICCA quarterfinals that they won in 2024 at the Church Hill Theatre. The group went on again to win the quarterfinal, this time picking up best choreography for the whole set and best soloist for Ben Hayes for ‘He used to be Mine’ whilst also scoring the highest in the UK for the quarterfinal round.

Having won their quarterfinals in the ICCA the group competed at the semifinals again at the New Wimbledon Theatre, where they placed 2nd in the UK the year before, this time placing 3rd, with Ben Hayes winning outstanding soloist again for 'He used to be Mine'.

In August of 2025 the group returned to the Edinburgh Fringe Festival after a 3-year hiatus. On the 22nd of August the group released the album 'Bad Academic Practice'.

The group performed at the University of St Andrews matriculation ceremony at the Younger Hall in September for 2025.

In October 2025 the group returned to the Byre Theatre, St Andrews having not performed there for two years. At this concert the group raised money for the Friends of the Byre Charity while introducing their newest members. The group also performed for the Royal and Ancient Golf Club of St Andrews in October 2025.

The group performed at Earlsferry Town Hall for their annual 'Festive Drink and Show' on the 12th December 2025.

=== 2026 – present ===
The Other Guys, on the St Andrews Pier, 2026

Subsequent to the release of the album 'Bad Academic Practice' in 2025, on the 22nd February 2026 it was announced that the group had been nominated 6 times at The Contemporary A Cappella Society 2026 Recording Awards. The group was nominated in the Best Show Tunes Song category for "Dancing Through Life" and "He Used to be Mine", Best Lower Voices Collegiate Arrangement for "9 to 5", Best Lower Voices Song for "Heroes", Best European Album for the entire project and Best Theme Song for "What's New Scooby-Doo" which came runner up overall in its category.

The Group performed at Holy Trinity Church, St Andrews again on the eve of their annual ball in 'The Other Concert' on the 27th March 2026.

In lieu of the 100th Anniversary of the Kate Kennedy Procession in April 2026, the group performed both for a charity event in a temporary Spiegeltent alongside a screening from St Andrews born musician KT Tunstall and for the Community Day.

== Members and Alumni ==
Current Members

- Charlie Tavolato - Bass & VP (Musical Director)
- Joseph Hall - Tenor (President, Business Manager & Assistant Musical Director)
- Arthur Fink - Baritone (Social Media & PR)
- Ian Crews - Tenor (Social Secretary)
- Ben Hayes - Countertenor
- Harry Stuart - Tenor & VP
- Harry Aspinall - Baritone
- Corban Goodsell - Bass
- Sam Flores - Bass
- Ollie Casey - Tenor
- Caleb Hickling - Tenor

== Discography ==
=== Studio albums ===
- Indecent Exposure (2006)
- The Damage Is Done (2007)
- Well Sung (2009)
- Barely Regal (2011)
- The Other Guys' Christmas (2012)
- Just For You EP (2013)
- 10 (2014)
- Right to Roam (2016)
- Making Waves EP (2018)
- Seven Is Heaven EP (2023)
- XX (2024)
- Bad Academic Practice (2025)

=== Singles ===
- Auld Lang Syne (Free Download) (2011)
- St Andrews Girls (Charity Single) (2012)
- Christmas Gets Worse Every Year (2012)
- I Only Bought You Flowers Because I Love You So (2013)
- Run To You: The Other Guys' Commemoration Single (2014)
- It's Raining Men (Charity Single) (2015)
- 24K Meghan (2018)
- Fairytale in New York (2018)
- Holding Out for a Hero (Charity Single) (2024)
- Love On Top (2025)
