= Wathen Hall =

Concert hall in London, England

Coordinates: 51.4887°N 0.2372°W

The Wathen Hall at St Paul's School is a small concert hall in Barnes in the London Borough of Richmond upon Thames. Designed by BHM Architects and opened in 1999, it forms part of the St Paul's School music department and is used for school concerts as well as external events. The hall seats 316 people. Artists appearing there during the opening season included pianists Murray Perahia and Radu Lupu, and violinist Maxim Vengerov. The Wathen Hall has become well known as a recording venue for solo and chamber music and its acoustics have been widely praised.

== Music at St Paul's ==
Music at St Paul's is an annual subscription concert series held at the Wathen Hall. These are open to members of the public, as well as to pupils and staff of St Paul's School and St Paul's Juniors and their families.
