= London A Cappella Festival =

London A Capella Festival
- Genre: A cappella, vocal
- Locations: London, England
- Coordinates: 51°32′3.63″N 0°7′19.04″W
- Years active: 2010–present
- Website: londonacappellafestival.com

The London A Cappella Festival is an annual series of concerts based at Kings Place, London, showcasing a cappella acts from around the world, curated by the vocal group The Swingle Singers and Ikon Arts Management. The aim of the festival is to celebrate the human voice in all the wide-ranging musical forms; including choral singing, beatbox, barbershop, gospel music, close-harmony, pop, and jazz.

== Inaugural Festival 2010 ==
The inaugural festival ran from 13 to 16 January 2010 at Kings Place, the arts venue at Kings Cross. Musicians included early music ensemble Stile Antico, pop/jazz group Voces8, Out of the Blue, London Adventist Chorale, and the Swingle Singers. Free foyer performances with groups such as The Oxford Gargoyles, and afternoon workshops made up the remainder of the festival programme.

== 2011 Festival ==
The second festival took place in January 2011 at Kings Place, curated again by the Swingle Singers and Ikon Arts Management. Headline acts included The Real Group, Witloof Bay (with RoxorLoops), the Swingle Singers, and the London Bulgarian Choir, Eclectic Voices, and Hertfordshire Chorus.

== 2012 Festival ==
The 2012 Festival featured the Vasari Singers directed by Jeremy Backhouse, The Boxettes featuring beatbox champion Bellatrix, Cadence, the best of British Barbershop from Cottontown Chorus, London Vocal Project, The Swingle Singers and, making their London debut, Scandinavian group FORK. There were free foyer performances and workshops from vocal educators such as Pete Churchill.

== 2013 Festival ==
Headline acts included The Magnets (supported by All the King's Men), the King's Singers and the festival hosts the Swingle Singers. Other headline acts included the Choir of Clare College Cambridge, Postyr, and Retrocity. The festival included workshops, foyer performances, lectures, and interactive events. The festival also marked the beginning of the London A Cappella International Summer School.

== 2014 Festival ==
Performers included The House Jacks (U.S.), The Real Group (Sweden), Slix (Germany), Backstep with Bellatrix (UK), The Songmen (UK), Time Ensemble, Swingle Singers (UK) and Estonian Voices(Estonia).
