= The Techtonics =

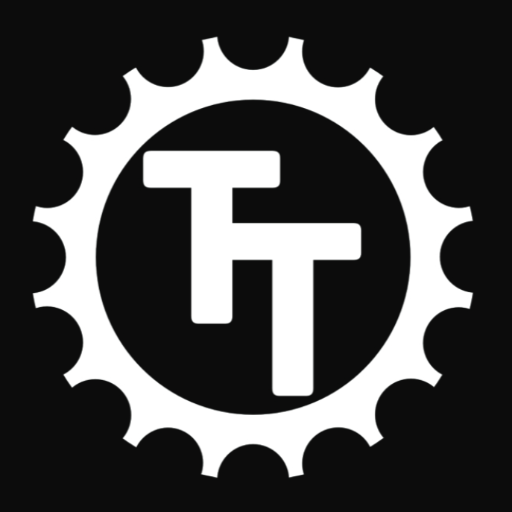

Background information
- Origin: Imperial College London
- Genres: A Cappella
- Years active: 2008–present
- Members: Thomas Stephens (Musical Director); Hugh Blayney (President); Louis Sharrock (Treasurer); Matthew Guy (Publicity Officer); Tom Briggs (Equipment Officer); Theo Barfoot; Arran Bayliss-Chalmers; Arun O’Sullivan; Jonathan Hedley; Alexander MacLaren; Shanil Panara; Cornelius Carlsson; Paul Monaghan; Charlie Houseago; Roshani Abbey (Choreographer)
- Website: www.thetechtonics.co.uk

The Techtonics are an all-male a cappella group from Imperial College London. The group was formed in 2008, and has since risen to prominence in the world a cappella scene.

The group is best known for winning the International Championship of Collegiate A Cappella in 2016.

The group is also known for winning Best Male Collegiate Song at the Contemporary A Cappella Recording Awards (CARA) for their cover of Earthquake in their 2012 album "Groundbreaker", and for busking weekly on Portobello Road.

== History ==
Formed in 2008 by Edward Brightman and Christian Carter the group is composed solely of STEM students from Imperial College London. The Techtonics performed their first gig at 'ArtsFest' (an annual celebration of arts at Imperial) in February 2009. They went on to perform at their first full concert in December 2009 in the Imperial College Christmas concert, which has since become an annual fixture for the group.

In 2010, The Techtonics competed in their first competition, The Voice Festival UK (VFUK), and won the award for outstanding arrangement, awarded to Christian Carter for the arrangement 'Come Undone'.

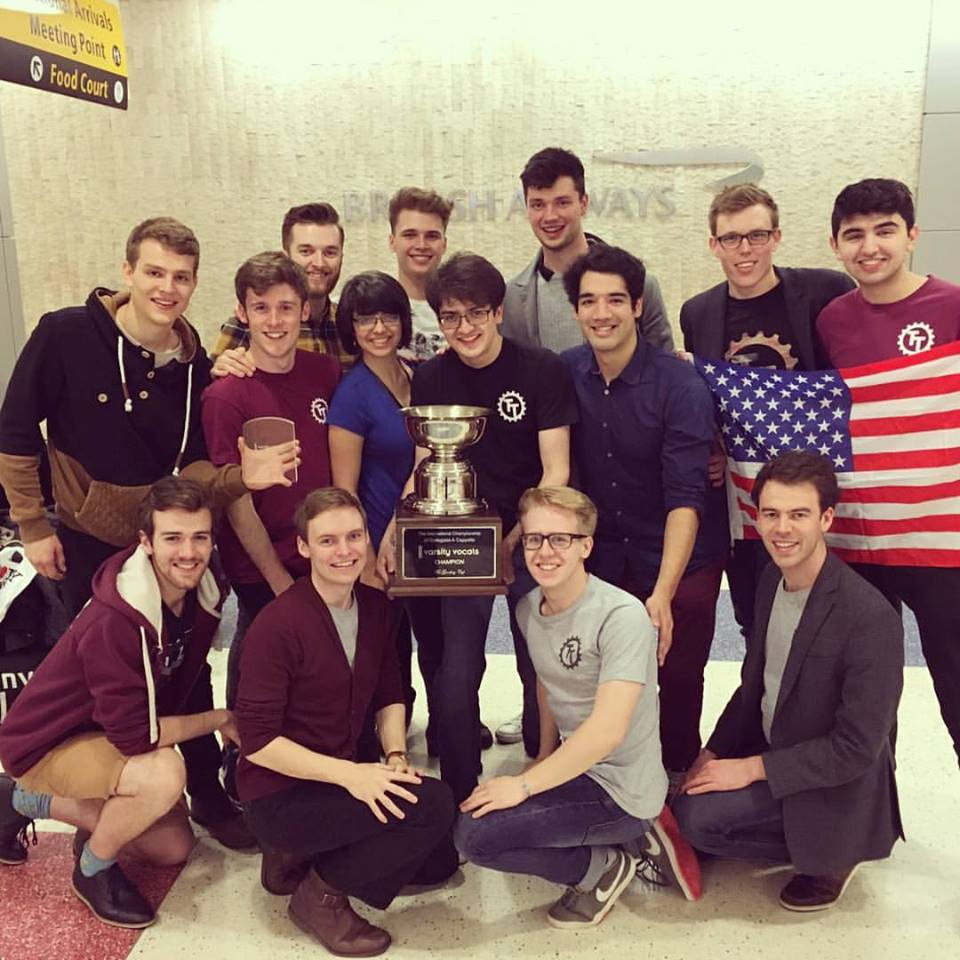
The Techtonics after their ICCA win in 2016.

In August 2010, the group performed for the first time at the Edinburgh Fringe festival.

In 2015, the International Championship of Collegiate A Cappella (ICCA) began hosting annual live competition rounds in the UK. Imperial College A Cappella Society hosted the semi-finals from 2015 to 2016, which The Techtonics competed in both times. In 2016, the group placed first in the UK, and went on to win the ICCA world championships in New York.

The following summer, the group performed for a second time at the Edinburgh Fringe festival with their show Don’t Push the Button, which was awarded 5 star reviews.

From March - April 2017 the group went on tour to Hong Kong to perform as a part of the Hong Kong International A Cappella Festival.

In April 2017, the group recorded a cover of Bang Bang (Jessie J, Ariana Grande and Nicki Minaj song), arranged by Kyle Alexander Hogan, former member of the University of Rochester YellowJackets, for the UK TV series Tonight at the London Palladium, which aired on 19 April 2017.

== Competitions ==
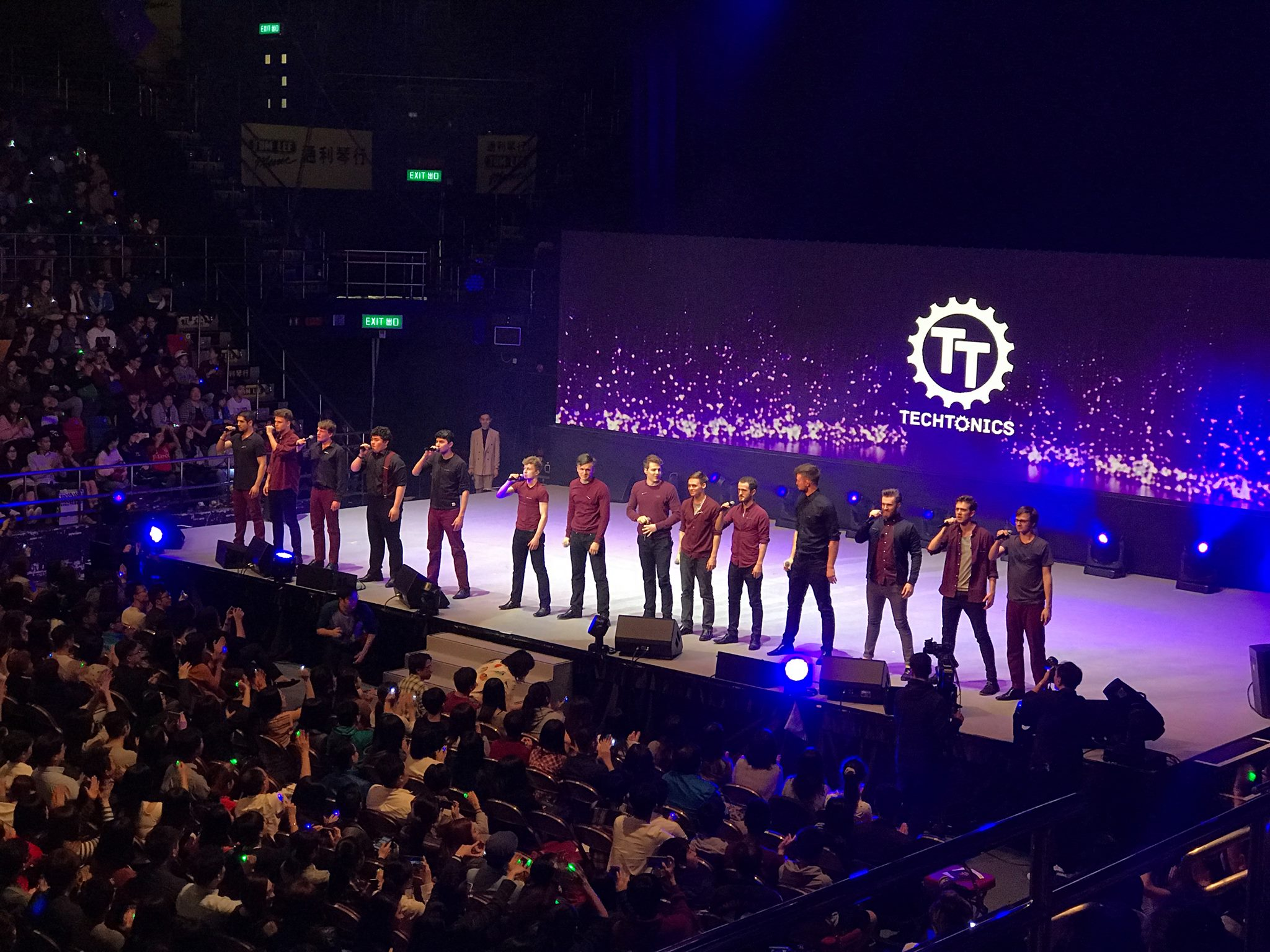
The Techtonics at the Queen Elizabeth Stadium for the Hong Kong A Cappella Festival

=== Voice Festival UK Awards ===
- Outstanding Soloist: Peter Noden, March 2014
- Outstanding Soloist: David Maguire, Outstanding Vocal Percussion: Max Hunter, March 2013
- Outstanding Performance, Outstanding Soloist: David Verhoeven, Feb 2012
- Outstanding Performance, March 2011
- Outstanding Arrangement: Christian Carter for 'Come Undone', Feb 2010 (2nd Year of VFUK)

=== International Championship of Collegiate A Cappella (ICCA) ===
- 2016
  - World Champions of Collegiate A Cappella 2016
  - Outstanding Choreography: UK Quarter Finals (overall performance) and Semi Finals (Bicycle Race by Queen)
  - Outstanding Arrangement: Bicycle Race (Arranged by Conrad Godfrey and Alex Moore) UK Quarter Final
- 2015
  - Competed in 2015 UK Semi-final, did not place.

== Tours ==
Every year the group embarks on a self-managed tour, normally international, providing the opportunity to perform in many unique venues as well as meet other groups from around the world.

Year	Location	Cities Visited
2018	USA East Coast	Boston, MA, New Haven, CT, New York, NY, Washington, DC
2017	USA Deep South	Orlando, FL, Gainesville, Florida, New Orleans, LA, Memphis, TN, Nashville, TN, Knoxville, TN, Durham, North Carolina, Columbia, South Carolina, Jacksonville, FL, Tallahassee, FL
2017	Hong Kong	Hong Kong
2016	UK	Edinburgh Fringe Festival
2015	USA and Canada	New York City, NY New Haven, CT Providence, RI Boston, MA Montreal, QC Toronto, ON Rochester, NY Collegeville, PA
2014	California	San Francisco Los Angeles San Diego Monterey
2013	USA East Coast	New York City, NY New Haven, CT Providence, RI Collegeville, PA Rockville, MD Washington, DC Durham, NC Raleigh, NC Pigeon Forge, TN Atlanta, GA
2012	USA East Coast	New York City, NY New Haven, CT Providence, Rhode Island Washington, DC Philadelphia, PA Syracuse, NY Rochester, NY
2011	Croatia	Rijeka Krk
2010	UK	Edinburgh Fringe Festival

== Recordings ==
=== Studio albums ===
- Groundbreaker (2012)
  - CARA winner for Earthquake
- Clockwork (2015)

=== Live Recordings ===
The Techtonics recorded a collaboration with Matt Mulholland, a popular YouTube musician, in 2015, of a cover of Ed Sheeran's Thinking Out Loud.

Many live recordings of The Techtonics busking on Portobello Road are found on Youtube.

== Alumni and Current Members ==
Name	Joined	Left	Voice Part	Course
Ed Brightman	2008	2011	Tenor I/II, Vocal Percussion	PhD Fuel Cells
Christian Carter	2008	2011	Tenor I/II, Vocal Percussion	Mechanical Engineering
Joe Illingworth	2008	2010	Tenor II, Baritone	Biochemistry
Jacob Brady	2008	2010	Tenor II, Baritone	Biochemistry
Eugene Chang	2008	2012	Tenor I/II	PhD Bioengineering
Jonathan Silver	2008	2009	Tenor II	Bioengineering
Ryan Dee	2008	2013	Bass, Baritone	Physics
Ben Krikler (BenK)	2008	2010	Bass	Physics
Nic Church	2008	2009	Tenor I	Civil Engineering
Attakorn (Ohm) Saiyasombat	2008	2010	Bass	Electrical and Electronic Engineering
Abdul (Aziz) Kamara	2008	2009	Bass	Electrical and Electronic Engineering
Reuben Rowe	2008	2011	Tenor I/II	PhD Computer Science
Steve Garland	2008	2009	Tenor I	Physics
Tom Horner	2009	2010	Bass, Baritone, Vocal Percussion	MSc Science Communication
Jamie Wasley	2009	2010	Tenor II	Visiting US
Niall Smith	2009	2010	Bass	Mathematics
Zain Khawaja	2009	2012	Tenor I/II, Vocal Percussion	Chemistry
Luke Johnston	2009	2012	Baritone, Vocal Percussion	Chemical Engineering
Ayman Osman	2009	2011	Tenor I	Mechanical Engineering
Ben Chadwick (BenCh)	2010	2012	Baritone	Mathematics
James Hayward	2010	2014	Tenor I	Chemistry
Ed McDonald	2010	2012	Tenor II	Medicine
Guy Needham	2010	2011	Bass	Biochemistry
Chandra (AK) Kaza	2010	2012	Tenor II	Chemical Engineering
Tom Stokes	2010	2012	Bass	Medicine
Peter Scott	2011	2015	Tenor II	Medicine
Philip de Grouchy	2011	2011	Bass	PhD Physics
Max Hunter	2011	2013	Bass, Sound Engineer	Physics
David Maguire	2011	2013	Bass	Civil Engineer
Alex Moore	2011	2016	Bass	Physics
Mike Ronan	2011	2014	Bass	Chemical Engineering
David Verhoeven	2011	2012	Tenor I	MSc Civil Engineering
Chris Witham	2011	2015	Tenor I	Physics
Will de Renzy-Martin	2012	2012	Bass	Computer Science
Conrad Godfrey	2012	2014	Tenor I	Computer Science
Akash Mehta	2012	2013	Tenor II	Electrical and Electronic Engineering
Peter Noden	2012	2016	Baritone	Geology
Chris Pellew	2012	2015	Tenor II	Biochemistry
Theo Barfoot	2013	2018	Vocal Percussion	Biomedical Engineering
Freddie Barker	2013	2014	Baritone	Mathematics
James Hay	2013	2014	Tenor I	Computer Science
Will O'Reilly	2013	2016	Tenor I	Medicine
Ehsaan Shivarani	2013	2017	Tenor I, Countertenor	Geophysics
Alex Wedderburn	2013	2014	Tenor II	Earth Sciences
Henry Harrod	2014	2016	Baritone	Mechanical Engineering
Arran Bayliss-Chalmers	2014	2018	Tenor I	Earth Sciences
Nick Bradley	2014	2017	Baritone	Theoretical Physics
Ezra Kitson	2014	2015	Tenor I	Natural Sciences
Arun O'Sullivan	2014	2018	Countertenor, Tenor I/II, Baritone	Medicine
Laurence Pallant	2014	2015	Baritone	Medicine
Edric Ramirez-Valdez	2014	2017	Tenor II, Vocal Percussion	Biological Sciences
James Cunningham	2015	2016	Tenor II	Electrical and Electronic Engineering
David Smith	2015	2016	Tenor II	Petroleum Geoscience
Tom Stephens	2015	2018	Tenor II	Materials Science and Engineering
Hugh Blayney	2016	-	Baritone	Physics
Matthew Guy	2016	-	Tenor II	Materials Science and Engineering
Jonathan Hedley	2016	-	Bass	Chemistry with Molecular Physics
Alexander MacLaren	2016	-	Countertenor, Tenor I	Mechanical Engineering
Louis Sharrock	2016	-	Tenor II, Baritone	MSc Statistics
Dan Bartley	2017	2017	Baritone	Civil Engineering
Charlie Houseago	2017	2018	Tenor I/II	PhD Robotics
Benjamin Wu	2017	2017	Tenor II	MSc Computer Science
Thomas Briggs	2017	-	Baritone	Mechanical Engineering
Cornelius Carlsson	2017	-	Vocal Percussion	Materials Science and Engineering
Paul Monaghan	2017	-	Tenor I	Physics with Theoretical Physics
Shanil Panara	2017	-	Tenor II	Materials Science and Engineering

== Imperial A Cappella Society ==
The Techtonics were ineligible to become a society of the Imperial College Union (ICU) because as a stand-alone group, it is too small in size and single gender. This led to members of the group starting the Imperial College A Cappella Society of which The Techtonics would be part of, with the wider aim of making the activity of A Cappella open to all ICU members and to promote other groups to form.

Societies at Imperial are able to purchase pewter tankards for their society, and get them engraved with leading members - however due to the historical independence of The Techtonics (existing before the a cappella society), both a tankard for The Techtonics and Imperial A Cappella Society reside in the Union bar.

As of 2016, 5 established groups are recorded as being within the society, making it one of the largest university a cappella societies in the UK:

- The Techtonics
- The Imperielles (all-female, formed in 2011)
- The Scopes (mixed, formed in 2011)
- Take Note (all-female, barbershop style)
- Surcery (mixed, fusion style)

The Techtonics perform with the other a cappella groups at Imperial frequently, singing alongside them in Christmas concerts, Easter concerts, and a number of times at the annual Imperial Summer Ball.
