= Sing: Ultimate A Cappella =

British TV programme

- Presented by: Cat Deeley
- Country of origin: United Kingdom

Original release
- Network: Sky One
- Release: October 6 – November 10, 2017

Sing: Ultimate a Cappella is a British TV programme shown on Sky One from 6 October to 10 November 2017 presented by Cat Deeley.
