= List of collegiate a cappella groups in the United States =

This is a list of collegiate a cappella groups in the United States.

Group name	Institution	Membership	Year founded	Ref
The Accafellas	Michigan State University	Tenor/Bass	1996	
The Accidentals	University of Georgia	Tenor/Bass	1974	
After Eight	Cornell University	Soprano/Alto	1991	
Another Round	Indiana University	Tenor/Bass	1996	
The Bandersnatchers	Skidmore College	Tenor/Bass	1975	
The Bear Necessities	Brown University	Tenor/Bass	1992	
The Beelzebubs	Tufts University	Tenor/Bass	1962	
BisCaydence	University of Miami	Mixed	2011	
Binghamtonics	Binghamton University	Mixed	1987	
Brick City Singers	Rochester Institute of Technology	Tenor/Bass	1999	
Brovertones	Dartmouth College	Tenor/Bass	1993	
The Brown Derbies	Brown University	Tenor/Bass	1982	
Buck That!	Ohio State University	Tenor/Bass	2010	
California Golden Overtones	University of California, Berkeley	Soprano/Alto	1984	
Chai Town	University of Illinois at Urbana–Champaign	Tenor/Bass	2001	
The Chaptones	Chapman University	Mixed	2014	
The Cheezies	Miami University	Tenor/Bass	1989	
Chorallaries of MIT	Massachusetts Institute of Technology	Mixed	1977	
The Chordials	Cornell University	Mixed	1997	
Wolfgang A Cappella	North Carolina State University	Mixed	1997	
The Claremont Shades	Claremont Colleges	Mixed	1994	
The Clef Hangers	University of North Carolina at Chapel Hill	Tenor/Bass	1977	
Cleftomaniacs	Drexel University	Mixed	2012	
Cleftomaniacs	University of Maryland Baltimore County	Mixed	2006	
'Cliffe Notes	Harvard University	Soprano/Alto	1991	
The Colgate Thirteen	Colgate University	Tenor/Bass	1942	
Collegium Underground	Harvard University	Mixed	1971	
Compulsive Lyres	University of Michigan	Mixed	1997	
Conn-Men	University of Connecticut	Tenor/Bass	2001	
Cords	Dartmouth College	Tenor/Bass	1996	
Counterpoint	Stanford University	Soprano/Alto	1979	
Crapapella	Smith College	Soprano/Alto	1996	
The Crosbys	Binghamton University	Tenor/Bass	1982	
CU Buffoons	University of Colorado-Boulder	Tenor/Bass	1962	
The Dartmouth Aires	Dartmouth College	Tenor/Bass	1946	
The Davidson Delilahs	Davidson College	Soprano/Alto	1998	
Deep Treble	Rutgers University	Mixed	1998	
Dhamakapella	Case Western Reserve University	Mixed, South Asian	2005	
Dicks and Janes	University of Michigan	Mixed	1998	
The Din & Tonics	Harvard University	Tenor/Bass	1979	
The Dissipated Eight	Middlebury College	Tenor/Bass	1952	
Divisi	University of Oregon	Soprano/Alto	2001	
Dodecaphonics	Dartmouth College	Mixed	1984	
Dooley Noted	Emory University	Mixed	2006	
The Dreamers of Phi Mu Alpha	Pennsylvania State University	Tenor/Bass	1989	
The Duke's Men of Yale	Yale University	Tenor/Bass	1952	
Duly Noted	University of Massachusetts Amherst	Mixed	2015	
Tone Definition	University of Florida	Mixed	2012	
The Earth Tones	University at Albany	Tenor/Bass	1998	
Ecotones	University of Georgia	Mixed	2010	
Eight Beat Measure	Rochester Institute of Technology	Tenor/Bass	1987	
Ektaal	University of Virginia	Mixed	1999	
Emocapella	George Washington University	Tenor/Bass	2001	
Enchanted	Tufts University	Mixed	2013	
Ephlats	Williams College	Mixed	1956	
Everyday People	Stanford University	Mixed	1987	
Exit 245	James Madison University	Tenor/Bass	1998	
Faux Paz	University of Maryland	Mixed	1993	
Fleet Street	Stanford University	Tenor/Bass	1981	
Footnotes	Princeton University	Tenor/Bass	1959	
Fundamentally Sound	University of Wisconsin–Madison	Tenor/Bass	2005	
The G-Men	University of Michigan	Tenor/Bass	1995	
The Georgetown Chimes	Georgetown University	Tenor/Bass	1946	
Georgetown Superfood	Georgetown University	Mixed	1995	
The Gentlemen of the College	The College of William and Mary	Tenor/Bass	1990	
Glee Club Lite	Harvard University	Tenor/Bass	1985	
Good Question	Williams College	Mixed	1995	
The Hangovers	Cornell University	Tenor/Bass	1968	
The Harmelodics	Northern Illinois University	Soprano/Alto	2014	
Harpur Harpeggios	Binghamton University	Soprano/Alto	1983	
Hoos in Treble	University of Virginia	Soprano/Alto	1999	
The Hullabahoos	University of Virginia	Tenor/Bass	1987	
Hum	University of Texas Austin	Mixed	2001	
The Huskie Hunks	Northern Illinois University	Tenor/Bass	2011	
IC Voicestream	Ithaca College	Mixed	2002	
Illini Awaaz	University of Illinois at Urbana–Champaign	Mixed	2005	
Ithacappella	Ithaca College	Tenor/Bass	1996	
The Idlers	United States Coast Guard Academy	Tenor/Bass	1957	
The Jabberwocks	Brown University	Tenor/Bass	1949	
Kalakaar	The University of Georgia	Mixed	2013	
The Katzenjammers	Princeton University	Mixed	1973	
The Krokodiloes	Harvard University	Tenor/Bass	1946	
Ladies First A Cappella	Michigan State University	Soprano/Alto	1985	
The Logarhythms	Massachusetts Institute of Technology	Tenor/Bass	1949	
LowKeys	Harvard University	Mixed	1999	
The Maccabeats	Yeshiva University	Tenor/Bass	2007	
MadHatters	University of Wisconsin–Madison	Tenor/Bass	1997	
Magevet	Yale University	Mixed	1993	
Maize Mirchi	University of Michigan	Mixed	2007	
The Meddiebempsters	Bowdoin College	Tenor/Bass	1937	
Melodores	Vanderbilt University	Tenor/Bass	2009	
The Mendicants	Stanford University	Tenor/Bass	1963	
UC Men's Octet	University of California, Berkeley	Tenor/Bass	1948	
Midnight Ramblers	University of Rochester	Tenor/Bass	1998	
Milk and Cookies	Mount Holyoke College	Soprano/Alto	1989	
MIT Resonance	Massachusetts Institute of Technology	Mixed	2000	
Mixed Company of Yale	Yale University	Mixed	1981	
The Madison Project	James Madison University	Tenor/Bass	1996	
Mosaic Whispers	Washington University in St. Louis	Mixed	1991	
The Muses	Massachusetts Institute of Technology	Soprano/Alto	1988	
Nassoons	Princeton University	Tenor/Bass	1941	
The New Blue of Yale	Yale University	Soprano/Alto	1969	
Night Owls	Vassar College	Soprano/Alto	1942	
No Comment	University of Illinois at Urbana–Champaign	Mixed	2004	
Nocturnal	Rice University	Mixed	2010	
The Nor'easters	Northeastern University	Mixed	1997	
Northwestern Undertones	Northwestern University	Mixed	2001	
Not Too Sharp	University of New Hampshire	Tenor/Bass	2002	
Note-oriety	James Madison University	Soprano/Alto	1998	
Notes Over Storrs	University of Connecticut	Mixed	2009	
Noteworthy	Brigham Young University	Soprano/Alto	2003	
Noteworthy	University of Georgia	Soprano/Alto	1988	
Off The Clock	Bentley University	Mixed	2010	
Ohms	Massachusetts Institute of Technology	Mixed	2010	
On a Sensual Note	American University	Tenor/Bass	1996	
The Originals	Carnegie Mellon University	Mixed	1996	
Out of the Blue	Yale University	Mixed	1986	
Penn Masala	University of Pennsylvania	Tenor/Bass	1996	
Penny Loafers	University of Pennsylvania	Mixed	1986	
The Pitchforks of Duke University	Duke University	Tenor/Bass	1979	
Pitch Please	Ithaca College	Mixed	2012	
The Poor Richards	Franklin and Marshall College	Mixed	1968	
Premium Blend	Ithaca College	Soprano/Alto	1998	
Profecy A Cappella	Rowan University	Tenor/Bass	2014	
Purple Haze	Northwestern University	Mixed	1996	
Quirks	Trinity College	Soprano/Alto	2004	
Raag	Rutgers University	Mixed	2002	
Raagapella	Stanford University	Tenor/Bass	2002	
The Radcliffe Pitches	Harvard University	Soprano/Alto	1975	
Rather Be Giraffes	Brandeis University	Mixed	2002	
Redhot & Blue	Yale University	Mixed	1977	
The Resolutions	Colgate University	Mixed	1992	
Rhythm Method	Binghamton University	Mixed	1993	
Shir Appeal	Tufts University	Mixed	1995	
Significant Others	Northwestern University	Soprano/Alto	1994	
Sil'hooettes	University of Virginia	Soprano/Alto	1988	
Simply Vocale	Chapman University	Soprano/Alto	2008	
Sirens	Simmons University	Soprano/Alto	1989	
The Sirens	Marist University	Soprano/Alto	1998	
The Smiffenpoofs	Smith College	Soprano/Alto	1936	
The Smithereens	Smith College	Soprano/Alto	1945	
The SoCal VoCals	University of Southern California	Mixed	1995	
The Society of Orpheus and Bacchus	Yale University	Tenor/Bass	1938	
Sonata Problem	North Central College	Mixed	2012	
The Liquid Hotplates	University of California, Davis	Mixed	2000	
The Spizzwinks(?)	Yale University	Tenor/Bass	1914	
The Spokes	University of California, Davis	Soprano/Alto	2004	
Speak of the Devil	Duke University	Tenor/Bass	1991	
sQ!	Tufts University	Mixed	1994	
Stanford Harmonics	Stanford University	Mixed	1991	
Stanford Mixed Company	Stanford University	Mixed	1985	
The Statesmen	Pennsylvania State University	Tenor/Bass	2011	
Stilettos	University of Maryland Baltimore County	Soprano/Alto	2007	
Suri	Emory University	Mixed	2015	
Swara	Virginia Tech	Mixed	2024	
The Swinging 'Gates	Colgate University	Soprano/Alto	1974	
Taal Tadka	Georgia Institute of Technology	Mixed	2007	
Talisman	Stanford University	Mixed	1990	
Tigertones	Princeton University	Tenor/Bass	1946	
Time Check	Marist University	Tenor/Bass	1995	
The Tritones	University of California, San Diego	Mixed	1996	
The Trojan Men	University of Southern California	Tenor/Bass	2005	
Tupelos	Wellesley College	Soprano/Alto	1947	
The Harvard-Radcliffe Veritones	Harvard University	Mixed	1985	
The Vanderbilt Melodores	Vanderbilt University	Tenor/Bass	2009	
The Virginia Belles	University of Virginia	Soprano/Alto	1977	
Two Past Midnight	Bucknell University	Mixed	1995	
The Ursa Minors	Brown University	Soprano/Alto	1981	
The Victory Eights (The V8s)	Mount Holyoke College	Soprano/Alto	1942	
Virginia Gentlemen	University of Virginia	Tenor/Bass	1953	
Vocal Point	Brigham Young University	Tenor/Bass	1991	
VoiceMale	Brandeis University	Tenor/Bass	1994	
Voices in Your Head	University of Chicago	Mixed	1998	
The Whiffenpoofs	Yale University	Tenor/Bass	1909	
The Yale Alley Cats	Yale University	Tenor/Bass	1943	
The Yale Russian Chorus	Yale University	Tenor/Bass	1953	
