= Wellesley College (disambiguation) =

Wellesley College may refer to:

- Wellesley College, Wellesley, Massachusetts, U.S., a women's liberal arts college
  - Wellesley College Botanic Gardens
  - Wellesley College Tupelos
- Wellesley College, New Zealand, a boys' school in Days Bay, Eastbourne

== See also ==
- Wellesley, Massachusetts
- Arthur Wellesley, 1st Duke of Wellington
