= Trinity College Quirks =

The Trinity College Quirks
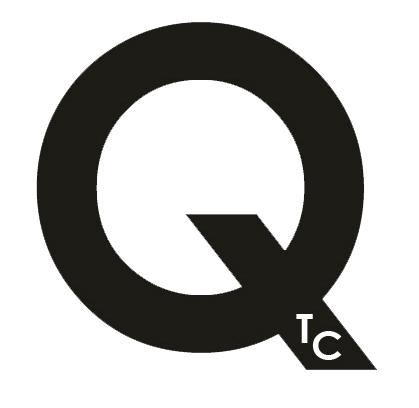

Background information
- Genre: Collegiate a cappella
- Years active: 2006–present
- Website: http://www.TrinityCollegeQuirks.com

The Trinity College Quirks is an all-female a cappella group at Trinity College in Hartford, Connecticut, founded in 2004 by Anna Vognsen and Brie Schwartz. They have appeared at the 2012 Silver Chord Bowl, Carnegie Hall (2016), Infinity Hall (where they have sung with Lucy Kaplansky, Joe Robinson (musician), and The Whiffenpoofs of Yale), the Wadsworth Atheneum, the 2012 Hartford Business Journal's Women in Business awards ceremony, and a Boston Red Sox game at Fenway Park. They have also performed with Jaimoe's Jasssz Band. They were featured on both NBC Connecticut and NPR. in October 2012. In 2013, the Quirks performed at the White House as one of the entertainment groups for the Christmas White House tours.

== Discography ==
The Trinity College Quirks have recorded a total of 3 albums throughout its history:

- Summit Sessions, 2007
- Right On Q, 2010
- Final Concert (Live!), 2011
- "View from the Summit", 2013
