= Chai Town =

University of Illinois a cappella group

Background information
- Origin: University of Illinois Urbana-Champaign, Illinois, US
- Genres: A cappella, world
- Years active: 2001–present
- Labels: A Cappella Records
- Website: www.chaitown.org

Chai Town is an all-male, South Asian a cappella group based at the University of Illinois Urbana-Champaign. Formed in 2001, Chai Town is an a cappella group and specializes in mixing South Asian and Western music songs together in unique and complex vocal arrangements. Since its inception, Chai Town has released five studio albums and tours across the United States and Canada to perform their music.

== History ==
Towards the end of 2000, two students, Anish Parikh and Rishi Jain, created a last minute act for a talent competition at the University of Illinois at Urbana-Champaign. The act ended up being a success and they decided to continue it as a student organization. The two, being avid drinkers of tea and being from the suburbs of Chicago, combined the moniker for Chicago, Chi-Town, with chai - the word for tea in Hindi and many South Asian languages - to form the name, Chai-Town. In 2015, the group dropped the hyphen in their name.

Chai Town still tours throughout the year, across the United States and Canada, performing for humanitarian funding efforts, private events, private fundraisers, and school events. They have performed for multiple events aiming to raise funds for educating children in India, in partnerships with schools.

== Notable performances ==
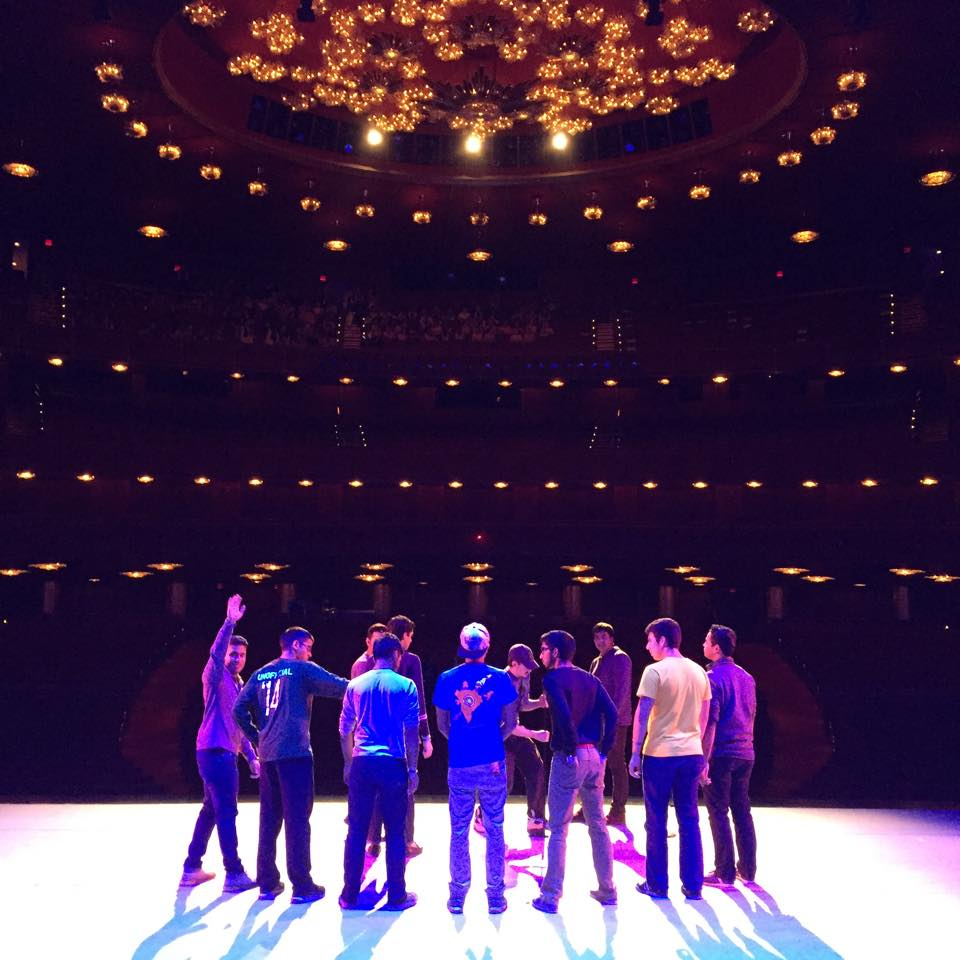
Chai-Town A Cappella performing at the John F. Kennedy Center for the Performing Arts

September 27, 2014 - Performs at University of Connecticut for Asha for Education, a non-profit organization dedicated to increasing education availability in India held Storrs, Connecticut.

August 15, 2014 - Performs at TD presents Mosaic Festival (with Rekha Bhardwaj, Karsh Kale, and Jonita Gandhi) in Toronto, Ontario, Canada.

February 3, 2013 - Benefit concert at Saint Louis University alongside Astha a Cappella and opens for Penn Masala.

January 25, 2013 - Performs at Knox College for International Fair 2013.

December 1, 2012 - Guest act at The Manhattan Project 4.0, a fusion dance competition held in Manhattan, New York.

November 13, 2012 - Performs at Drake University for the Diwali Night 2012 show.

April 6, 2012 - Performs at a fundraiser for CARE International hosted by the Delta Phi Omega sorority at the University of Illinois at Chicago.

March 10, 2012 - Chai-Town holds its tenth anniversary show, The BrewPrint, and releases their third studio album, Fresh Brewed.

February 11, 2012 - Chai-Town places 2nd at Gathe Raho 2012.

September 30, 2011 - Live performance of Amplifier, originally by Imran Khan, is featured on Desi Hip Hop.

February 26, 2011 - Guest act at Naach Nation 9, an intercollegiate dance showcase, held at Columbia University in New York City.

February 19, 2011 - Performance at Knox College.

November 13, 2010 - Chai-Town places 3rd at Anahat 2010.

April 10, 2010 - Chai-Town places 3rd at Gathe Raho 2010.

March 12, 2010 - Performance at the University of Missouri.

March 8, 2010 - Chai-Town participates in the Will-TV A Cappella BEATdown competition with a Cappella groups like the Rip Chords, Girls Next Door, Tone Rangers, Blu Bop, Chandani, Femme Forte, and Cut Time. Chai-Town is declared as the overall winner of this competition by winning the online and phone votes while also being the judges' choice.

January 23, 2010 - Performance at the Krannert Center for Performing Arts at the University of Illinois for a Martin Luther King Jr. Community Event.

January 22, 2010 - Featured at the local radio station in Champaign, Illinois on January 22, 2010.

November 7, 2009 - Chai-Town places 2nd at Anahat 2009.

October 31, 2009 - Chai-Town wins the Homegrown Talent Competition at the University of Illinois at Urbana-Champaign while competing with the likes of the Rip Chords, Girls Next Door A Cappella, Dance 2XS, 3 Spot and a lot more.

April 13, 2009 - Awarded the Best Organization Award by the Asian American Cultural Center.

Spring of 2009 - Chai-Town performs at Marquette University, University of Michigan, Ann Arbor, Illinois State University, University of Missouri, and take part in the competition Gathe Raho, hosted by the University of Iowa.

Chai-Town participates in the South-Asian a cappella competition called Anahat, hosted by University of California at Berkeley and has achieved first place twice in 2004 and 2007.

Chai-Town performs at all major events at UIUC organized by the Indian Students Association like India Night.

== Style ==
Chai-Town covers a wide range of musical genres. This includes music from Indian movies like My Name is Khan and Anjaana Anjaani, such as "Sajda" and "Tujhe Bhula Diya". They have also covered English songs of western artists, for example "Anytime" by Brian McKnight, "Kiss From a Rose" by Seal, and "Rockin' That Thang" by The-Dream. Some of their most recent songs include "Mirrors", by Justin Timberlake and hip-hop song "All of the Lights" by Kanye West, which have been uploaded to YouTube, Spotify, and Apple Music.

Chai-Town has also covered songs in other Indian languages besides Hindi/Urdu; They have covered a Tamil song, "Pachchai Nirame", a Telugu song, "Aunana Kaadana", and a Punjabi song, "Amplifier", further expanding their repertoire of languages. Chai-Town has mixed many Indian songs with English songs. Some among the many are "Rockin' That Thang" by The-Dream mixed with "Pehli Nazar Mein" from the movie Race and "Imma Put It on Her", by Day26, mixed with "Tu Hi Meri Shab Hai" from the movie, Gangster, and "Love in This Club" by Usher.

== Discography ==
Thus far, Chai-Town has released five albums and six singles. Two of the albums, Good to the Last Drop and Arohanam, were produced through STTM Productions and their two latest albums, SPECTRUM and The Brewprint, were produced by Plaid Productions. Presently, all of Chai-Town's music is distributed through Loudr.

SPECTRUM (2017): Arranged by Niranjan Jayanth, Chirantan Neogy, Ali Nizamani, & Shanay Thakkar

No.	Title	Soloist(s)	Length
1.	"Phir Se Ud Chala/Ilahi"	Shashank Gaur, Paarth Joshi	3:52
2.	"Beautiful Soul/Khabar Nahi"	Milan Shah, Chirantan Neogy, Niranjan Jayanth	3:43
3.	"Sun Saathiya"	Paarth Joshi, Niranjan Jayanth, Vignesh Chandrashekhar, Nathan Du	4:14
4.	"Dil Cheez Tujhe Dedi/Boro Boro"	Sai Rajesh, Chirantan Neogy	3:59
5.	"Jee Le Zaraa/Kabhi Jo Baadal Barse"	Giri Sharma, Shashank Gaur	4:02
6.	"Tu Hi Mera/Ishq Sufiyana/Channa Mereya"	Niranjan Jayanth, Chirantan Neogy	4:42
7.	"The SRK Mix"	Anshuman Girdhar, Ronjoy Kalita, Shashank Gaur	4:04
8.	"The Weeknd Mix"	Milan Shah, Manan Shah, Ajie Mathew	5:00
9.	"Latch"	Manan Shah	3:41
10.	"Tu Chahiye/What Do You Mean"	Paarth Joshi, Manan Shah	4:11
11.	"Awari"	Niranjan Jayanth, Giri Sharma	4:43
12.	"Dus Bahane/Run This Town"	Milan Shah, Anshuman Girdhar, Ronjoy Kalita, Ajie Mathew	3:50

The SRK Mix - Single (2015): Arranged by Niranjan Jayanth

No.	Title	Soloist(s)	Length
1.	"The SRK Mix"	Anshuman Girdhar, Ronjoy Kalita, Shashank Gaur	4:04

The Brewprint - (2014): Arranged by Ali Nizamani, Aalok Gandhi, Arindam Chakravartti, Tanmay Mishra & Kevin Thomas

No.	Title	Soloist(s)	Length
1.	"Mann Mera"	Aalok Gandhi	3:00
2.	"I Want It That Way/O O Jaane Jaana/Tearin' Up My Heart"	Aaron Oraham, Siddharth Soni, Sunil Thomas	3:30
3.	"Teri Justajoo/Maula Mere"	Aalok Gandhi, Angad Uday	4:45
4.	"Bumpy Ride/Turn Me On/Kiss Me Baby"	Ali Nizamani, Jay Kim, Ronjoy Kalita	3:43
5.	"Mar Jaava"	Aalok Gandhi	3:51
6.	"Can't Hold Us"	Ali Nizamani, Nicholas Ezyk, Milan Shah	3:05
7.	"Tum Hi Ho"	Angad Uday	3:47
8.	"Mirrors"	Tanmay Mishra	4:33
9.	"Birthday Cake/Punjabi Remix/Lil' Freak"	Sunil Thomas, Shashank Gaur, Anshuman Girdhar, Kevin Thomas, Allen Mathew	3:44
10.	"Give Me Love/Amnesia"	Milan Shah, Siddharth Soni	7:24

Mirrors - Single (2013): Arranged by Ali Nizamani & Tanmay Mishra

No.	Title	Soloist(s)	Length
1.	"Mirrors"	Tanmay Mishra	4:18

Boyfriend - Single (2012): Arranged by Tanmay Mishra

No.	Title	Soloist(s)	Length
1.	"Boyfriend"	Neesh Shah, Tejas Mallela, Arindam Chakravartti	2:52

Fresh Brewed (2012): Arranged by Arindam Chakravartti, Tanmay Mishra, Kevin Thomas, Amit Vaishampayan & Neesh Shah

No.	Title	Soloist(s)	Length
1.	"All of the Lights"	Kevin Thomas, Neesh Shah, Sai Gudimella, Aalok Gandhi	3:30
2.	"Anytime/U Got it Bad"	Tanmay Mishra, Jaison Alexander	4:35
3.	"Sajda/Tere Naina"	Vivek Thyagarajan, Tejas Mallela	4:25
4.	"Dhadke Jiya"	Tejas Mallela	3:29
5.	"Kiss From a Rose"	Kevin Thomas	3:49
6.	"Amplifier"	Neesh Shah, Arindam Chakravartti	3:22
7.	"Aunana Kaadana/Pee Loon"	Vinay Srinivasan, Arindam Chakravartti	4:45
8.	"Yeah 3x/Tonight (I'm Lovin' You)"	Tanmay Mishra, Neesh Shah	3:11
9.	"Rockin' That Thang/Pehli Nazar Mein"	Jaison Alexander, Tanmay Mishra	3:20
10.	"Choli Ke Peeche Kya Hai/My Kinda Girl"	Vinay Srinivasan, Eeshaan Roy	3:27
11.	"Tujhe Bhula Diya"	Tejas Mallela, Tanmay Mishra, Arindam Chakravartti	3:18
12.	"Imma Put It on Her/Tu Hi Meri Shab Hai/Love in This Club"	Kevin Thomas, Aalok Gandhi, Tanmay Mishra	4:06

Arohanam (2008): Arranged by Ravi Jain, Jaimin Amin, Neal Srivastava & Arjun Venkataswamy

No.	Title	Soloist(s)	Length
1.	"Arohanam"	Vinay Srinivasan, Amit Vaishampayan	1:38
2.	"Teri Deewani"	Amit Vaishampayan	4:32
3.	"Pachchai Nirame"	Vinay Srinivasan	3:30
4.	"Maaeri"	Harsh Shrivastava	5:36
5.	"Mohabbatein Medley"	Samarth Bhaskar, Aditya Mehta, Bimel Thomas, Saurabh Kukreti, Vinay Srinivasan, Samarth Bhaskar, Amandeep Gargi, Amit Vaishampayan	3:54
6.	"Because of You/Kya Mujhe Pyaar Hai"	Bimel Thomas, Aditya Mehta	3:52
7.	"Mitwa"	Amit Vaishampayan	4:05
8.	"Nachangeh Sari Raath/Tempted to Touch"	Aditya Mehta, Neal Srivastava	4:05
9.	"Sexyback/Jumma Chumma De De"	Jaimin Amin, Harsh Shrivastava, Ibrahim Mekki	3:35

Good Till The Last Drop (2006) : Arranged by Anish Parikh, Rishi Jain & Ravi Jain

No.	Title	Soloist(s)	Length
1.	"Yeh Dosti/I'll Be There for You"	Harsh Shrivastava, Ravi Jain	2:38
2.	"Ghanan Ghanan"	Vikram Raghavan	4:00
3.	"Mohabbatein Medley"	Anish Parikh, Vishal Desai, Jaimin Amin, Ashish Shah, Harsh Shrivastava, Danial Baweja, Raghu Kumar, Vikram Raghavan	4:07
4.	"Insomniac"	Rishi Jain	3:55
5.	"Maine Pyaar Kiya/Kiss the Girl"	Siddhartha Raja, Rishi Jain, Ravi Jain	5:02
6.	"I Still Haven't Found What I'm Looking For/Koi Mil Gaya"	Anish Parikh, Danial Baweja	4:30
7.	"Woh Chand Jaisi Ladki [Live]"	Vikram Raghavan	4:10
8.	"In The End"	Siddhartha Raja, Ashish Shah	3:24
9.	"Kal Ho Naa Ho/Right Here Waiting"	Harsh Shrivastava, Anish Parikh	4:18
10.	"The Lion Sleeps Tonight/Brown Eyed Girl"	Rishi Jain, Anish Parikh, Jaimin Amin	4:36

== Members ==
Chai-Town holds auditions at the beginning of every semester. Every semester, the group picks up as many new members as it needs.

As of 2023, members are Satej Sukthankar, Agastya Gaur, Anantajit Subhramanya, Azeem Newaz, Aditya Nair, Dhruv Menon, Dhairya Mehta, Ayaan Gul, Dhruv Auti, Srikar Girijala, Mihir Apte, Shrikar Chennuru, Aryan Chandra, Kaushal Amancherla, and Parthiv Voleti.

List of Alumni: Anish Parikh, Rishi Jain, Ashish Shah, Sandip Shah, Aditya Nemlekar, Pritesh Patel, Ashwin Suresh, Rishin Pandya, Rahul Nayak, Paras Mehta, Gaurav Venkateswaran, Vikas Jain, Virag Shah, Terrence Moduthagam, Eric Jensen, Dome Mongkolpradit, Sean Wang, Josh Cho, Jaimin Amin, Aditya Mehta, Ravi Jain, Vishal Desai, Harsh Shrivastava, Gaurav Dubey, Bharat Srikishan, Neal Srivastava, Siddhartha Raja, Akash Kushal, Danial Baweja, Suchun Shah, Raghu Kumar, Vikram Raghavan, Ibrahim Mekki, Saurabh Kukreti, Bimel Thomas, Samarth Bhaskar, Arjun Venkataswamy, Prashanth Venkataramanujam, Amandeep Gargi, Amit Vaishampayan, Shazad Ahmed, Gautam Srikishan, Manu Colacot, Eeshaan Roy, Vivek Thyagarajan, Arun Kousik, Andy Castillo, Tim Stilling, Anooj Avashia, Jaison Alexander, Bharat Kusuma, Tanmay Mishra, Amol Gokhale, Neesh Shah, Arindam Chakravartti, Bijoy Varghese, Vinay Srinivasan, Tejas Mallela, Sai Gudimella, Kevin Thomas, Anant Kumar, Jeswin Thomas, Sunil Thomas, Aaron Oraham, Aalok Gandhi, Angad Uday, M. Asif Bhatti, Anshuman Girdhar, Milan Shah, Siddharth Soni, Chirantan Neogy, Ronjoy Kalita, Anto Sagayaraj, Paarth Joshi, Manan Shah, Shanay Thakkar, Mason Qian, Sergio Arroyo, Shan Tulshi, Vignesh Chandrasekar, Siddharth Ray, Sai Rajesh, Nathan Du, Adarsh Ramchandran, Vikransh Aggarwal, Adithya Rajan, Prudhvi Kalla, Yash Hiremath, Sagnik Banerjee, Rishi Krishnan, Keerthi Rajaram, Ninaad Sridharan, Aaron Wang, Abhimanyu Thosar, Aditya Dutt, Sabar Nimmagadda, Vishal Moola, Kavin Lavari, and Suchet Kumar.
