= Northwestern Undertones =

American university a cappella group

- Origin: Northwestern University in Evanston, Illinois
- Genres: Collegiate a cappella
- Years active: 2001–present
- Labels: Independent
- Website: Official Site

The Northwestern Undertones are a 20-member co-ed collegiate a cappella group from Northwestern University in Evanston. Founded in 2001 by Jeni Noerenberg, the group was originally called Something Old, Something NU, but the name changed within a year.

Today the Undertones tour both nationally and internationally. Over the past decade they have performed in Washington D.C., California, Miami, Philadelphia, St. Louis, Houston, Boston, and Edinburgh, Scotland. They perform three shows on campus a year, compete in the International Collegiate Championships of A Cappella, do gigs in the Chicago area, and record albums.

The track "Get Set" was selected for inclusion on the collegiate a cappella compilation album "Voices Only 2009" and the track "Perfect Day" was nominated for a CARA for Best Mixed Collegiate Arrangement. The album was moderately well received by the Recorded A Cappella Review Board.

The track "Before The Worst" selected for inclusion on the collegiate a cappella compilation album "BOCA 2011: Best of Collegiate A Cappella" and was nominated for a CARA for Best Mixed Collegiate Arrangement. Robert Dietz said that the arrangements are, "some of the best I've heard from the collegiate community," and the track "Eet" was selected as one of their Songs of the Year for 2011.

Their current album, released March 2013 is titled "Rock Paper Shotgun". It was nominated by the Contemporary A Cappella Recording Society for Best Mixed Collegiate album. The album's opening track "Plain Gold Ring" was nominated for Best Mixed Arrangement and Best Solo and was included in the compilations "Voices Only 2013" and CASA's "sing 10: neon." The track "Gunpowder and Lead" was nominated for Best Mixed Collegiate song, and the track "Bluebird" was selected for "Voices Only 2014."

== Awards ==
Year	Presenter	Award	Result
2008	ICCA Midwest Quarterfinal	Overall	1st Place
2008	ICCA Midwest Quarterfinal	Best Choreography	Winner (Joyee Lin, for "You Oughta Know")
2009	CARAs (Contemporary A Cappella Recording Awards)	Best Mixed Collegiate Arrangement	Nominated (“Perfect Day” - enter soUnd)
2009	Voices Only	Voices Only 2009	"Get Set" - enter soUnd
2010	ICCA Midwest Quarterfinal	Overall	2nd place
2010	ICCA Midwest Quarterfinal	Best Arrangement	Winner (Matt Edmonds - “I Will Follow You Into the Dark”)
2010	ICCA Midwest Semifinal	Best Arrangement	Winner (Matt Edmonds - “I Will Follow You Into the Dark”)
2011	BOCA (Best of Collegiate A Cappella)	BOCA 2011	"Before The Worst" - Boots and Cats
2011	CARAs (Contemporary A Cappella Recording Awards)	Best Mixed Collegiate Arrangement	Nominated (“Before The Worst” - Boots and Cats)
2011	RARB Pick	Songs of the Year	"Eet" - Boots and Cats
2012	ICCA Midwest Quarterfinal	Best Vocal Percussion	Winner (Matt Kania)
2013	CARAs (Contemporary A Cappella Recording Awards)	Best Mixed Collegiate Album	Nominated ("Rock Paper Shotgun")
2013	CARAs (Contemporary A Cappella Recording Awards)	Best Mixed Collegiate Arrangement	Nominated ("Plain Gold Ring" - Rock Paper Shotgun)
2013	CARAs (Contemporary A Cappella Recording Awards)	Best Solo	Nominated ("Plain Gold Ring" - Rock Paper Shotgun)
2013	CARAs (Contemporary A Cappella Recording Awards)	Best Mixed Collegiate Song	Nominated ("Gunpowder & Lead" - Rock Paper Shotgun)
2013	Voices Only	Voices Only 2013	"Plain Gold Ring" - Rock Paper Shotgun
2013	CASA	sing 10: neon	"Plain Gold Ring" - Rock Paper Shotgun
2014	Voices Only	Voices Only 2014	"Bluebird" - Rock Paper Shotgun
2015	ICCA Midwest Quarterfinal	Overall	1st Place
2015	ICCA Midwest Quarterfinal	Best Soloist	Eliza Palasz, "Baby I'm A Fool"
2017	ICCA Great Lakes Quarterfinal	Overall	3rd Place

== See also ==
- List of collegiate a cappella groups in the United States
- Northwestern University
