= On a Sensual Note =

American University a cappella vocal group

Background information
- Also known as: OASN
- Origin: Washington D.C., United States
- Genres: A cappella
- Years active: 1996–present
- Members: Teddy Skye-Garcia; Joseph Albushies; River Thompson; Boden Sorom; Laurel Ashe-Darby; Ian Deyerle; Nathaniel Plumridge; Achyuth Sarath; Kyle Fitzpatrick; Samuel Shapira

On a Sensual Note (OASN) is the first collegiate a cappella singing ensemble of American University, welcome to male-identifying individuals as well as non-binary folk. Founded in the fall of 1996, OASN is the university's oldest a cappella ensemble. The ensemble performs regularly at campus events, tours and visits other schools, and participates in regional festivals. OASN's most popular events include its biannual end-of-semester concerts in the Kay Spiritual Life Center, a tradition which has been mirrored by newer performing ensembles. OASN is the only collegiate a cappella group at American University to go on a Spring Break Tour to a specific destination, commonly on the East Coast; recent destinations include: New Orleans, LA, Miami, FL, Savannah, GA, and Charlotte, NC.

== History ==
=== The early years ===
In the fall of 1996, Jay Criscuolo and Jay Rao arrived as first-year undergraduate students at American University, each with a desire to participate in the collegiate legacy of men’s a cappella. Upon learning that there were no a cappella groups at AU, both independently began a search to find members to start a group. Eventually, they found each other. In their early months of searching, the group grew to only six members. It was not until the spring of 1998 that the group of six, under the name "Tastes Like Chicken," received its first gig.

=== The Present ===
Since its beginning, the group has established themselves as one of the most well-known a cappella groups in the D.C. area, performing at many prominent venues in the city and surrounding area. OASN has released eight albums and has taken multiple tours up and down the eastern seaboard. In September 2023, OASN released their eighth album entitled "128" which pays homage to their longtime rehearsal room located in the Katzen Arts Center's Room 128.

== Notable Performances ==
The group's most notable performance came on January 28, 2008 when the campaign of then U.S. Presidential candidate Barack Obama asked OASN to open for a rally at AU where Obama was endorsed by Senator Ted Kennedy. The ensemble learned Obama's campaign theme song, Stevie Wonder's "Signed, Sealed, Delivered I'm Yours" (1970), but was forced offstage after a teleprompter was kicked during their performance.

Since then, the group has performed at The White House, the Embassy of Singapore, Disney World, the National Cherry Blossom Festival, and for the U.S Secretary of Labor.

Most recently, the group performed Owl City's "Fireflies" on The Late Show with Stephen Colbert in March 2023.

== Discography ==
=== Albums ===
- Aural Pleasure (2001)
- Back to the Drawing Board (2002)
- The On a Sensual Note (2004)
- New Ties, Old Guys (2006)
- On a Sensual Night (2008)
- Spare Change (2009)
- Guys in Ties (2014)
- 128 (2023)

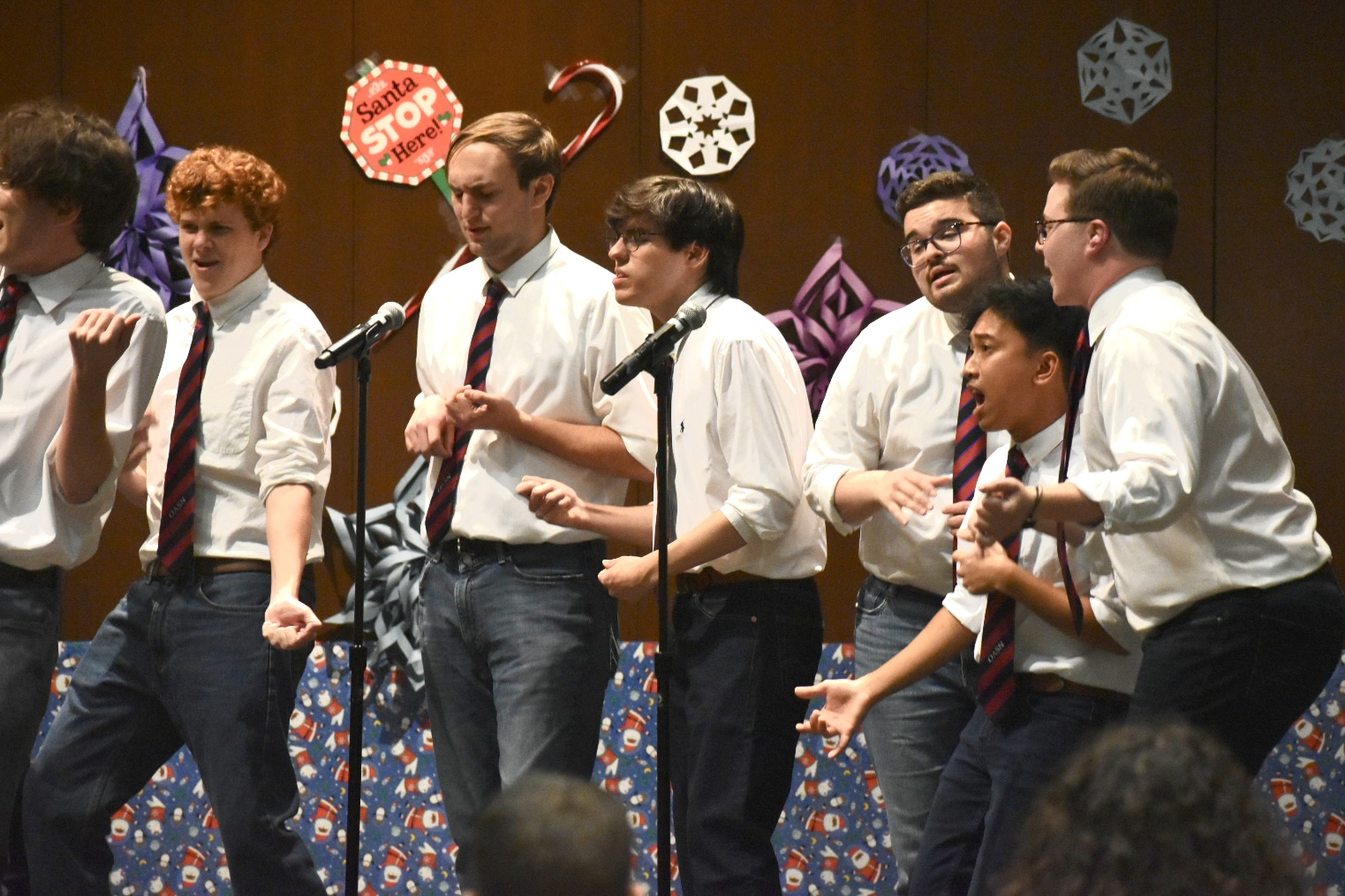
OASN's "Fa-La-La-Lidays" Winter Concert on December 1, 2023

== See also ==
- American University
- List of collegiate a cappella groups in the United States
- Collegiate A Cappella
