= UGA Accidentals =

Cappella group

The Accidentals are an all-male collegiate a cappella group. Formed in 1974, the Accidentals are the oldest a cappella group at the University of Georgia. The Accidentals are typically anywhere from 12 to 17 members and hold auditions every fall and occasionally at the end of the spring

== History ==
The Accidentals were formed in 1974 when the Director of The University of Georgia Men's University of Georgia Men's Glee Club, Dr. E. Pierce Arant, Jr. decided to liven up the concerts a bit by having a feature quartet. Over time the quartet grew to eight members, then twelve. In the mid-1980s Paul Tate joined the group and began to arrange more contemporary pop music for the group, a big change from the typical barbershop and spiritual music the group was used to doing with the Men's Glee Club. The Accidentals were widely heralded for their 1992 performance of "A Mighty Fortress" as arranged by the group Glad.

Paul Tate took up the Directorship of the Accidentals in 1993 and proceeded to whip the 12 members into shape. That year also brought about a landmark event: the Accidentals' first album, On The Map, which was only available on cassette, and sold out quickly. The group put out their second album the next year: S.O.L.D. O.U.T. (Songs Of Liberty, Devotion, and Other Universal Truths). The album was a great improvement over On The Map and gave the Accidentals a more polished and professional sound. The next year brought the Accidentals' third album in three years: Songs From Uncle Paul's Cabin.

In the spring of 1996, the Accidentals' first annual Invitational concert, UGAPALOOZA! The guest groups included The UNC Tar Heel Voices and The William & Mary Gentlemen of the College. In 1997 the Accidentals competed in their first a cappella competition, the southeast regional of The National Championship of Collegiate A Cappella (now the International Championship of Collegiate A Cappella), and walked away with First Place, and a Best Arrangement Award for Paul Tate's "Blessing."

In January 2001 the Accidentals released their first Christmas album, Meanwhile, Back at Christmas..., which was recorded live at the Accidentals' Christmas Concert in Edge Recital Hall on December 2, 2000.

Since 2000 the Accidentals have shifted their musical style away from their Glee Club origins towards a more contemporary pop sound, while also becoming completely student directed. They have been a continuous presence in Varsity Vocals International Championship of Collegiate A Cappella, and have continuously grown and improved as competitors each year they competed, culminating with ICCA Finals appearances in 2010, where they received 3rd place overall, and 2012. The Accidentals have used their experiences and success in ICCAs to meet and connect with other a cappella groups around the country, and have frequently been guest groups at colleges all across the southeast and up the east coast. They have also released several pop albums over the years:PDA (Public Displays of A Cappella) (2000), None of the Above (2004), 14 and Change (2006), Imprint (2009), A Gentleman's Game (2011), and Tune Down For What (2014).

== Albums ==
- On The Map (1993)
- S.O.L.D. O.U.T. (Songs Of Liberty, Devotion, and Other Universal Truths) (1994)
  1. A Patriotic Medley
  2. Si Iniquitates
  3. We Shall Walk Through the Valley In Peace
  4. Be Thou My Vision
  5. Wonderful Invention
  6. I Want To Hold Your Hand
  7. You Never Let Me Down
  8. In The Still Of The Night
  9. Down Over The Hill
  10. Don't Pull Your Love
  11. Without You
  12. Blessing
- Songs From Uncle Paul's Cabin (1995)
  1. Behold Man
  2. Crucifixus
  3. Lazarus Unwound
  4. Colorado Trail
  5. When I'm Sixty-Four
  6. Somebody
  7. She Is My Slender Small Love
  8. The First Noel
  9. Lo, How A Rose E'er Blooming
  10. Psallite!
  11. Good Lovin'
  12. Conjunction Junction
  13. You Don't Love Me Anymore
  14. Bad Case of Lovin' You
  15. Take A Chance On Me
- PDA (Public Displays of A Cappella) (2000)
  1. We Won't Sing That Way
  2. Up The Ladder
  3. I Wanna Hold Your Hand
  4. Every Time You Go Away
  5. Sweet Little Jesus Boy
  6. Kyrie
  7. Jessie's Girl
  8. Faith
  9. Change In My Life
  10. Prayer of The Children
  11. We Won't Sing That Way (Live)
- Meanwhile, Back At Christmas... (2001)
  1. Break Forth, O Heavenly Light
  2. I'll Be Home For Christmas
  3. Lo, How A Rose E'er Blooming
  4. Holiday Road
  5. Sweet Little Jesus Boy
  6. All My Lovin'
  7. The First Noel
  8. Up The Ladder
  9. Silent Night
  10. Change In My Life
  11. Oh Holy Night
  12. Twelve Days of Christmas
  13. Gaelic Blessing
- None Of The Above (2004) - produced by Diovoce, Inc.
  1. It's Alright
  2. Walking In Memphis
  3. Hard To Say Goodbye
  4. Let's Get It On
  5. Tears In Heaven
  6. Still The One
  7. Take Me As I Am
  8. Boogie Shoes (Remix)
  9. Dixieland Delight
  10. When You Come Back Down
  11. Take Me Home Tonight
- 14 And Change (2006) – produced by James Gammon
  1. Wish You Were Here
  2. Better Man
  3. Another Day In Paradise
  4. Grey Street
  5. The Freshman
  6. Don't Lie
  7. Back To You
  8. Ain't No Sunshine
  9. Can't Stop
  10. Iris
  11. Let That Be Enough
  12. Bad
  13. Georgia Medley
  14. Blessing
- Imprint (2009) – produced by Charlie Forkish
  1. Life Is a Highway
  2. Barrel of a Gun
  3. Violet Hill
  4. Rains In Asia
  5. Warning
  6. Nothing In My Way
  7. Everything
  8. Cupid's Chokehold
  9. On a Night Like This
  10. Lovestoned
  11. Acoustic #3
  12. Through With You
  13. Lullaby
- A Gentleman's Game (2011) – produced by A Cappella Records
  1. Don't You Worry 'Bout A Things
  2. Have It All
  3. She's Country
  4. Comin' Home Baby
  5. Bad Things
  6. Crawl
  7. Come Together
  8. A Change Is Gonna Come
  9. One Day
  10. Lips Like Sugar
  11. Use Somebody
  12. I Shall Not Walk Alone
  13. We All Need Saving (iTunes exclusive)
  14. Doug's Song (iTunes exclusive)
- Tune Down For What (2014)
  1. Never Say Never
  2. 14th Street
  3. I Can't Make You Love Me
  4. Hold My Hand
  5. Bridge Over Troubled Water
  6. China Grove
  7. Something To Believe In

== Awards ==
International Championship of Collegiate A Cappella

- 1997 Quarterfinals: Champion
- 1997 Quarterfinals: Best Arrangement – Paul Tate for "Blessing"
- 1998 Quarterfinals: Best Arrangement – Josh Byrd for "We Won't Sing That Way"
- 2005 Quarterfinals: Runner-Up
- 2005 Quarterfinals: Outstanding Vocal Percussion – Travis Barron and Taylor Gray
- 2005 Semifinals: Outstanding Vocal Percussion – Travis Barron and Taylor Gray
- 2007 Quarterfinals: Runner-Up
- 2007 Semifinals: 3rd Place
- 2007 Semifinals: Best Arrangement – Yannick Morgan for "Ain't No Sunshine"
- 2009 Quarterfinals: Champion
- 2009 Quarterfinals: Outstanding Arrangement: Kiley Dorton and Kirby Duncan for "Come Together"
- 2009 Quarterfinals: Outstanding Vocal Percussion: Schafer Gray for "Come Together"
- 2009 Semifinals: Runner-Up
- 2009 Semifinals: Outstanding Vocal Percussion: Schafer Gray
- 2010 Quarterfinals: Champion
- 2010 Quarterfinals: Outstanding Vocal Percussion: Schafer Gray for "Come Together"
- 2010 Semifinals: Champion
- 2010 Finals: 3rd Place
- 2010 Finals: Outstanding Soloist: Langdon Quin for "Come Together"
- 2010 Finals: Outstanding Vocal Percussion: Schafer Gray of the Accidentals
- 2012 Quarterfinals: Champion
- 2012 Quarterfinals: Outstanding Soloist: Andy Moon for "Bridge Over Troubled Water"
- 2012 Quarterfinals: Outstanding Arrangement: Stephen Hutchings for "Bridge Over Troubled Water"
- 2012 Semifinals: Champion
- 2012 Semifinals: Outstanding Vocal Percussion: Schafer Gray
- 2012 Finals: Outstanding Vocal Percussion: Schafer Gray
- 2014 Quarterfinals: Runner-Up
- 2014 Quarterfinals: Outstanding Soloist: Gemille Walker for "Say So"
- 2014 Quarterfinals: Outstanding Choreography: Nehemiah Lawson for "Say So"
- 2016 Quarterfinals: Runner-Up
- 2016 Quarterfinals: Outstanding Soloist: Tony Rhone for "Edge of Heaven"
- 2021 Quarterfinals: Champion
- 2021 Quarterfinals: Outstanding Soloists: Blaine Alligood for "Slow Dancing in the Dark" and Grant Allen for "Prisoner"
- 2021 Quarterfinals: Outstanding Mix: Grant Allen for the entire set

SOJAM A Cappella Festival

- 2009 Audience Favorite Award
- 2009 Runner-Up
- 2009 Best Choreography
- 2009 Outstanding Soloist: Marcus Hines for "Don't You Worry 'Bout A Thing"
