= Silver Chord Bowl =

American collegiate a capella competition

The Silver Chord Bowl is the oldest regional annual collegiate a capella competition, established in 1984 and run by the Northampton Arts Council. The competition has attracted many notable a cappella groups including the Dartmouth Aires and the Tufts Beezlebubs and the Amherst College Zumbyes. The competition has been held continuously going online for a year in 2021 because of the COVID-19 pandemic before returning to John M. Greene Hall in 2022. The showcase averages about 2,000 attendees per year.

The Silver Chord Bowl has also featured performances by high school a cappella groups including the Northamptones.
