= Accafellas =

The MSU Accafellas
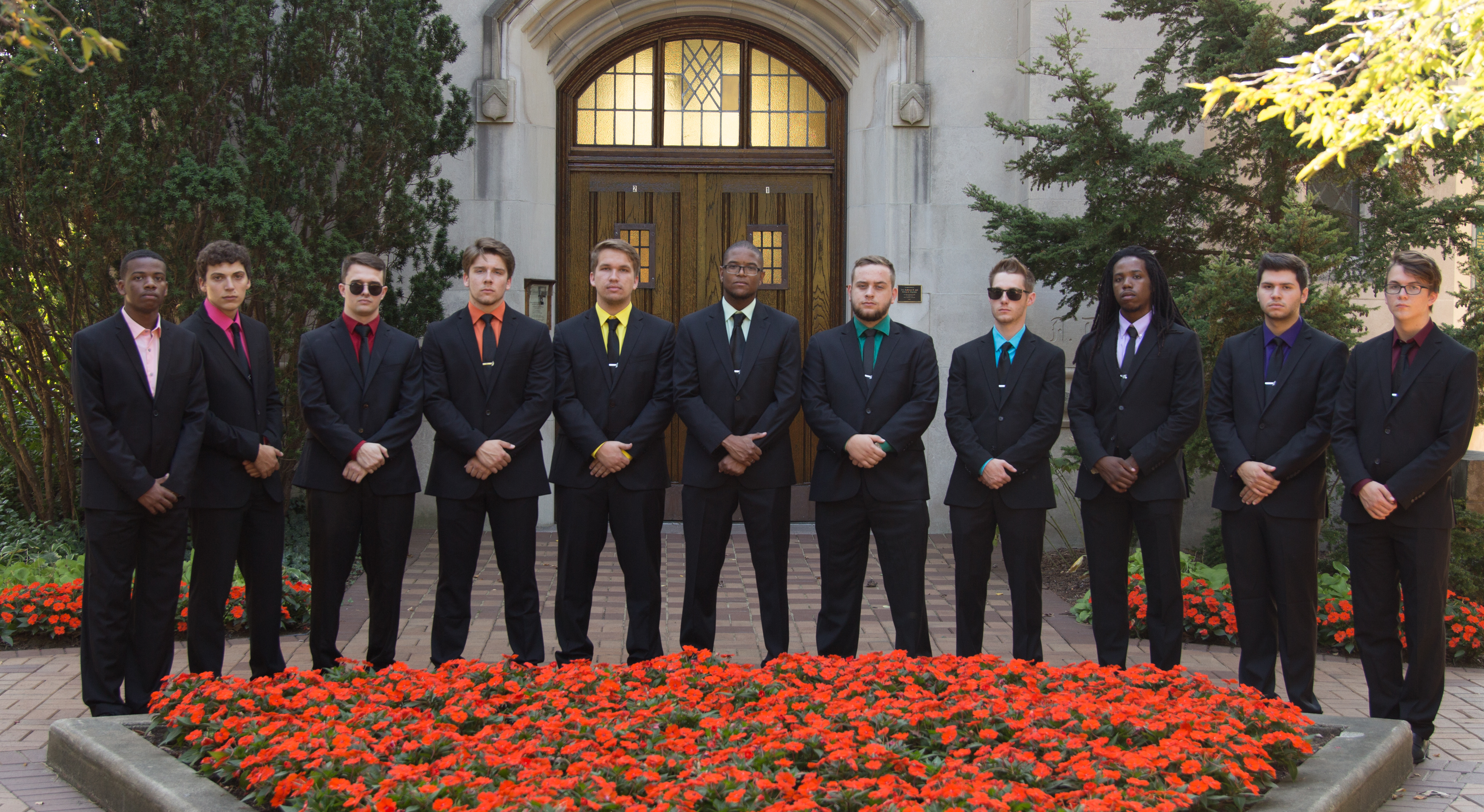
- MSU Accafellas, 2017-2018

Background information
- Also known as: The Fellas
- Origin: East Lansing, Michigan, United States
- Genre: A Cappella
- Years active: 1996–present
- Members: Isaac Luebke^{a}; Cael Sutherland; Jack Reynolds; Will Evans; Tyler Hulka; Oliver Angel; Noah Savage; Nick Wreschinsky; Alex Cross; Dylan Serrata; Robin Bernard; Julyan Porter; Joey Conroy; Chris Bertulfo
- Website: MSUFellas.com

The MSU Accafellas are a Tenor-Bass collegiate a cappella group from Michigan State University in East Lansing, Michigan, one of the six a cappella groups on campus. Founded in 1996, the group typically has between eight to fourteen singers. The Accafellas have released 8 albums to date. Their arrangement of Jason Mraz's "You and I Both" appeared on Varsity Vocal's Best of College A Capella (BOCA) compilation in 2006. In 2010, The Accafellas performed their arrangements of "Walking in Memphis" by Marc Cohn and "Would You Go With Me" in Nashville, Tennessee before the CMA Music Festival with Josh Turner.

The group often sings at events on the campus of Michigan State, dorms, weddings (often of Accafellas' alumni) as well as various locations around the nation. The group has performed at The White House, as well as Michigan Governor Jennifer Granholm's personal residence.

== History ==
In 1997, the Accafellas released their debut album, Accafellas Volume I. It is currently out of print.

In 1998, at the University of Michigan's Monsters of A Cappella concert, the relatively new Accafellas received a standing ovation from a pro-wolverine crowd.

In 2000, the Accafellas released a second album, appropriately Accafellas Volume II.

In 2004, the Accafellas released Accafellas Volume III. The album feels much more produced than the first two albums, and would be a great influence on future Accafellas' members as a high-quality album to strive to outdo.

In 2006, the Accafellas released "Accafellas Volume IV". Their version of the song You and I Both originally by Jason Mraz appeared on the Best of college a Cappella compilation that year.

On April 4, 2009, the Accafellas released "Accafellas Volume V". The album was recorded at Ryan Wert's Elm Street Recording Studio in Lansing, MI. Ryan Wert claimed that Volume V was "The most ambitious of the CD's (he's) recorded."

On June 11, 2010, the Accafellas performed the song Would You Go With Me with Josh Turner in Nashville, Tennessee, at his fan club party before the CMA Music Festival.

In addition, The Accafellas have competed in the International Championship of Collegiate A Cappella (ICCA). They have won awards at these competitions for their arrangements and soloists, most notably advancing to the regional semi-finals in 2008, 2013, and 2015.

In 2012, The Accafellas received two awards at their ICCA quarterfinal. Joe Caigoy won "Best Soloist" singing "Without You", and Jake Przybyla, Duncan Cooper and Richard Hofmeister won "Best Arrangement" for the song "Clocks".

In 2015, The Accafellas placed 2nd in their ICCA Regional Quarterfinal sending them to the Sectional Semifinals in Ann Arbor. Their set included Hozier's Take Me to Church (Solo: Connor Ralph), Sam Smith's Lay Me Down (Solo: Andrew Lee), and Fall Out Boy's Centuries (Solo: Brad Larsen)

In 2017, the Accafellas released "Fella Favorites", their first greatest hits album. The album was released on iTunes, Spotify, YouTube, and various other streaming sources. This was the group's first album to not be sold as a physical CD copy. The album features 17 songs, 2 from each of their 7 volumes, a song from the 2017 group, and their two alumni songs, "Wonderful Tonight" by Eric Clapton, and "Yellow" by Coldplay.

== The Sing-Off ==
The Accafellas auditioned for Season 1 of NBC's The Sing-Off. They advanced to the interview stage of the show, and were filmed performing Eric Clapton's "Wonderful Tonight" outside of the audition venue.

== Discography ==
- Accafellas Volume I (1997)^{b}
- Accafellas Volume II (2000)
- Accafellas Volume III (2004)
- Accafellas Volume IV (2006)
- Accafellas Volume V (2009)
- Accafellas Volume VI (2011)
- Accafellas Volume VII (2014)
- Fella Favorites (2017)
- Accafellas Volume VIII (2018)

== Notes ==
A.As of the 2025-2026 school academics.
B.Out of Print.
