= A Cappella Records =

American record label

- Founded: May 19, 2009
- Founder: Chris Crawford, Ross Morey, Jesse Avshalomov, Ryland Hale, Sebastian Wolff
- Genre: A cappella
- Country of origin: US
- Location: San Francisco
- Official website: www.acappellarecords.com

A Cappella Records is an American record label specializing in a cappella music. In 2010, the label participated in the UCSC's business model competition, winning first place and a $12,000 cash prize.

== History ==
A Cappella Records launched as an exclusively-digital record label on May 19, 2009. At that time, the organization participated in UCSC's first annual business model competition, but they were removed from the competition in the semi-finals round. Following their elimination from the 2009 USCS competition, they continued growing the label from an initial six albums to 25 artists, 500 tracks, and 30 albums in their first year. In 2010, the label returned to the business model competition and won first place, along with a $12,000 cash prize. That same year, the label represented four of the 10 groups competing on NBC's The Sing-Off.

== Joypad Records launch ==
On April 3, 2012, A Cappella Records launched its first sub-label, entitled Joypad Records. Dedicated to video game music covers, Joypad Records saw its debut single, a cover of the "Skyrim Main Theme" by Lindsey Stirling and Peter Hollens, chart worldwide, reaching #1 in the Netherlands and Sweden.
