= Binghamton Crosbys =

A cappella group

The Binghamton Crosbys (commonly referred to as The Crosbys) are a TTBB a cappella group at Binghamton University in Binghamton, New York, USA. They are four-time national championship finalists and won the International Championship of Collegiate A Cappella (ICCA) in 2003.

== History ==
The second independent music club recognized by the university, the Crosbys were founded in 1983 and remain the only TTBB a cappella singing group at Binghamton University. Like many collegiate a cappella groups, they are rooted in traditions tied to certain social events, attire, or means of address. The Crosbys usually perform in jeans and blazers; their alumni song — a collegiate a cappella tradition in which alumni present at the concert may join current members to sing — is "Strike Up the Band" (aka Jack). They undertake a two-week tour each winter, succeeded by The Jam, a large performance at the end of each semester.

The Crosbys typically compete in the ICCA competition every few years, as do many prestigious collegiate a cappella groups. They have progressed to the national championship round four times in the twenty-five years of the ICCA's existence, performing at Carnegie Hall, Lincoln Center, and winning the trophy during the finals held in 2003 at the Beacon Theatre on Broadway. They have also won many other awards at this competition, such as Best Soloist, Best Arrangement and Best Choreography.

In 1985, under the pseudonym Cliffs Notes (in honor of then school president Clifford Clark), the group was chosen as the winner of the campus-held Maxwell House Talent Competition for their performance of "Only You", which was to become a signature song of the group.

=== Notable Members ===
John Wilson.

== Discography ==
Album	Year
GOLA	2021
A Cosmic Voyage	2016
To Honor	2013
The Red Room	2011
25 - Remastered Greatest Hits	2008
Roadtrip to Munzville	2006
Crabs and Tartar Sauce	2004
Crosby 101	2002
Songs in the Key of Nishole	2000
Super Bos	1998
A Good Night Out	1995
Ten	1993
Naturally	1988
B.C. Junction	1987

== See also ==
- The Pegs
