= Magevet =

US Jewish musical group

- Magevet in November 2006 after a performance for Shimon Peres, former President of Israel.

Background information
- Origin: Yale University
- Genres: A cappella
- Years active: 1993–present
- Members: Sopranos; Hemakshi Gordy; Violet Barnum; Gloria Kim; Altos; Emma Donnini; Hannah Rubin; Ada Perlman; Sophie Schonberger; Tenors; David Liebowitz; Giri Viswanathan; Ilan Eisenberg; Basses; Noam Barenholtz; Shlomi Helfgot; Max Bamberger
- Website: http://www.magevet.org

Magevet is a collegiate Jewish a cappella singing group at Yale University. The group's repertoire includes liturgical, traditional, and modern arrangements of Jewish, Hebrew, and Israeli songs. Each year, Magevet conducts domestic and/or international tours and numerous weekend-length tours throughout New England and the mid-Atlantic states. The group has also performed special concerts for Israeli statesman Shimon Peres and Rabbi Lord Jonathan Sacks.

== Name ==
The group's name is the Hebrew word for "towel." The group was allegedly founded in the spring of 1993 in a sauna in the basement of Calhoun College (now Grace Hopper College), one of the undergraduate residential colleges at Yale, by four Orthodox Jewish men who enjoyed the acoustics of the sauna and decided to form a singing group. "Magevet" was chosen as the group's name to remind its members of their early experiences together.

== Membership ==
Members join the group through the a cappella rush process at Yale University. This process begins when first-years arrive on campus in late August and culminates in mid-to-late September with tap night. Members audition and are selected for membership based on their singing ability and the musical needs of the group. Students typically join during their freshman year and sing in the group for their four years as undergraduates at Yale.

== Tours ==
Each year, the group embarks on concert tours. Internationally, Magevet has visited Jewish communities in Australia, Germany, the Czech Republic, the United Kingdom, the Netherlands, Belgium, France, Spain, Canada, Israel, South Africa, Argentina, and Chile. In the United States, the group has traveled to California, Florida, Illinois, Nevada, Arizona, Louisiana, Georgia (U.S. state), Michigan, Tennessee, Missouri, Pennsylvania, Ohio, and many other states. Throughout the Yale academic year, the group also embarks on weekend tours of the Northeast, including to New York City, Boston, Philadelphia, and communities throughout Connecticut and New Jersey.

On May 25, 2014, Magevet joined in solidarity with the Belgian Jewish community in the wake of the tragic shootings at the Brussels Jewish Museum.

== Repertoire ==
The group's repertoire is selected by the group's musical director (affectionately known as the "pitch"). Each new musical director chooses songs to add or remove from the previous year's repertoire, many of which are arranged by members of the group. The repertoire includes music from Jewish communities around the world, from the Israeli song "Yerushalayim Shel Zahav" to a version of "L'cha Dodi" based on a Jewish melody from Calcutta. The group sings in many languages, including Hebrew, Yiddish, Ladino, Hindi, Luganda and English.

== Discography ==
Magevet has released ten albums to date:

- Mem's the Word (1995)
- Ekh Hu Shar (1997)
- Amen, Selah (2002)
- K'mei Nahar: A Shabbat with Magevet (2003)
- Mik'tze Olam (2004)
- Divrei Shir (2008)
- Aranen (2011)
- Naveh Katan (2016)
- Afikei Mayim (2020)
- Refuat Hanefesh (2023)
