= The Chordials =

American collegiate a cappella group

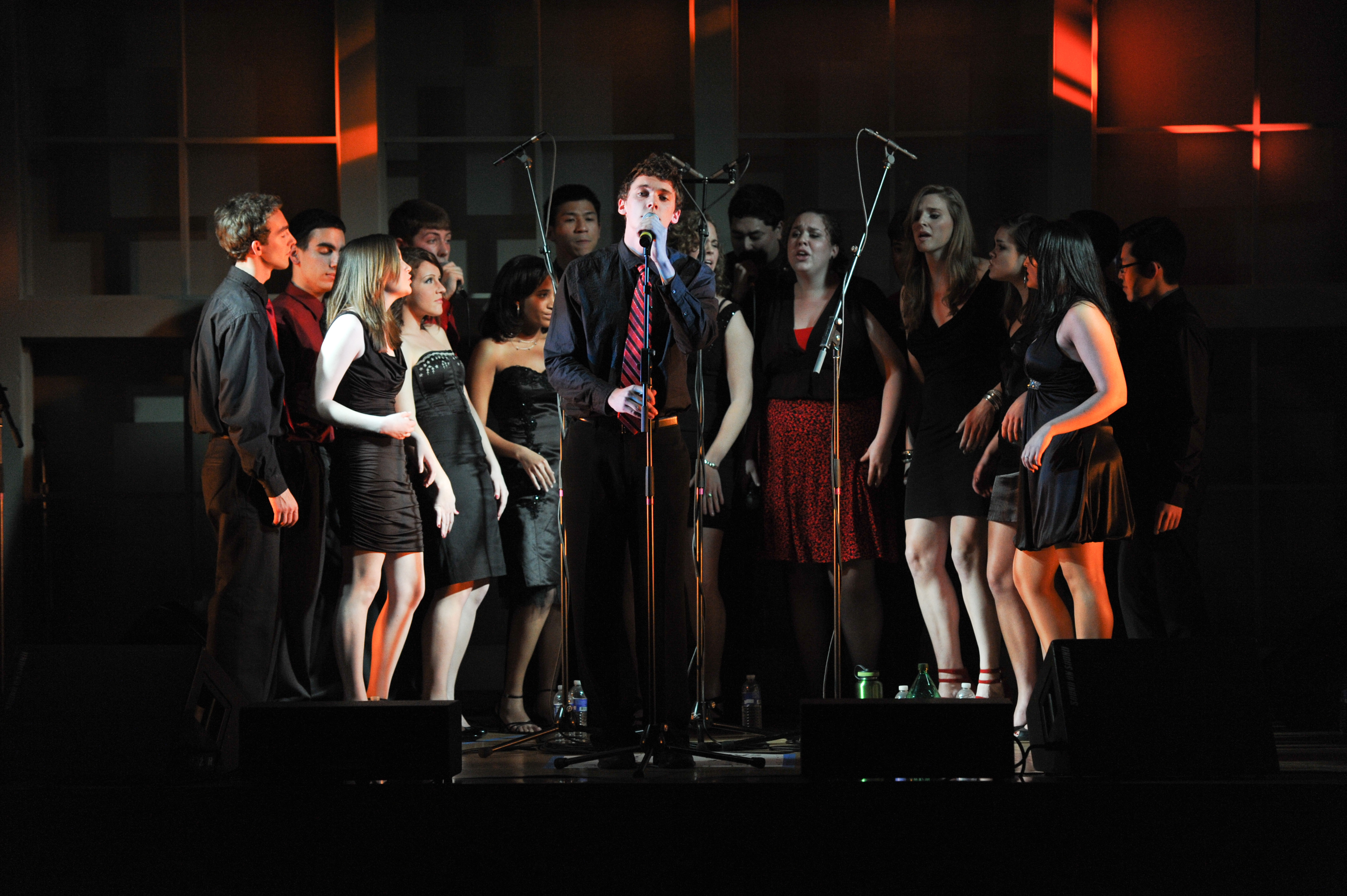
- The Cornell Chordials performing at Cocktail Hour XIII on April 16, 2010

Background information
- Origin: Cornell University in Ithaca, New York
- Genres: Collegiate a cappella, Pop, Rock, Soul, R&B, Alternative Rock, Indie
- Years active: 1997–present
- Members: President: Oliver Alfonso-Frank '28; Musical Director: Kate Townsend '28; Asst. Musical Director: Jude Garlic '26; Business Managers: Max Masleyev '26; Jude Garlic '26; Jiji Janpathompong '26; Secretary: Temira Weisberg '29; Publicity Manager: Max Masleyev ’26; Amy Yang '29; Social Chair: Kate Townsend ’29; Alumni Relations: Jiji Janpathompong ’26; DEI Chair: Xel Schnorbus ’26; Webmaster: Amy Yang ’29; Choreography Chair: Jiji Janpathompong ’26; ACAC Representative: Temria Weisberg ’29; Xel Schnorbus ’26
- Website: www.chordials.com

The Chordials is a collegiate all-gender a cappella group from Cornell University in Ithaca, New York. They are known for their edgy and passionate style, and perform a broad variety of music genres ranging from rock to alternative/indie to pop.

== History ==
The Cornell Chordials was founded in 1997 by a group of Cornell students, including founder Elana Wolff ('01), Music Director Dennis Chow ('99), President Anand Swaminathan ('99), and Business Manager Amanda Stahl ('99). The group has traveled and performed in many venues across the northeast, including at Penn State, Haverford, Rutgers, Muhlenberg, RPI, Johns Hopkins, Rochester, Buffalo, New York City, Martha's Vineyard, the Ithaca area, as well as many venues on the Cornell University campus.

Over the years, the Chordials have had anywhere from six to eighteen members. Every year since 1998 the group has produced at least one major concert, including their annual "Cocktail Hour" concert in the spring semester. Their original annual fall concert was titled "Crunkapella", but has since changed to "After Hours". Throughout their time at Cornell University, the Chordials have maintained a varied repertoire including such songs as Sam Sparro's "Black and Gold", Bon Iver's "8 (circle)", Fleetwood Mac's "The Chain" and Rihanna's "What Now". Through their regional performances and their several album releases, the Chordials have become a well-known exemplar of the collegiate a cappella genre.

The group produced their first album Shaken... Not Stirred in the spring of 1999. The album features songs such as "Come on Eileen" and "Killing Me Softly." The group's second album Not For Minors premiered in the fall of 2002, with songs including Sarah McLachlan's song "Angel" and Madonna's "Like a Prayer", which is now the Chordials' official alumni song. Their third album, The Third Chapter, features renditions of "Echo" by Incubus, Gladys Knight's "I Heard It Through the Grapevine", and "One Sweet Day" as recorded by Boyz II Men and Mariah Carey.

In 2001, the group made its debut at the ICCA (International Championship of College A Cappella) quarterfinals in Rochester, NY, during which member Gabi Kornfeld ('04) received the award for Best Vocalist for her performance of "Angel." In subsequent years, the group received additional awards at the ICCA including Best Choreography, Best Soloist, Best Arrangement, and Best Percussion. In 2004, the Chordials became ICCA Finalists, placing third at the ICCA Finals in New York City's Town Hall Theater (ICCA Website).

The group's fourth album, Arrival, was released on April 14, 2007, at their tenth anniversary concert "Cocktail Hour X". It was recorded and produced by alumnus James Cannon ('07), via his production company "The Panic Room." Arrival features complex arrangements of songs from the catalogs of artists such as Puddle of Mudd, Snow Patrol, Nine Inch Nails, and others. At the concert, the Chordials celebrated their first-ever appearance on the annual Best of College A Cappella (BOCA) album for their rendition of Nickelback's "Photograph". Arrival also went on to win the 2007 acaTunes Award for their cover of "Let Me Entertain You," featuring soloist Rebecca Urbelis ('08). The album became a Recorded A Cappella Review Board (RARB) Pick of the Year in 2007.

In 2008, the Chordials were nominated for the Contemporary A Cappella Recording Awards (CARAs) for the first time in their history. Arrival was nominated for all four awards in the Mixed Collegiate categories, including Best Song (nominated), Best Soloist (runner-up), Best Arrangement (winner), and Best Album (winner).

In December 2006 and 2007, the Chordials embarked on a week-long "Winter Tour" across the southern regions of New York State and northern New Jersey, focusing on giving performances and educational musical workshops at high schools across the region. In March 2009, The Chordials toured the southern regions of New York State yet again, as well as parts of western Connecticut.

In 2008, the Chordials released their fifth studio album, titled Smash, produced by alumni James Cannon ('07) and Ari Goldman ('09). This album, like Arrival, was nominated for all eligible categories in the Contemporary A Cappella Recording Awards (CARAs), and the album was also chosen as a Recorded A Cappella Review Board (RARB) Pick of the Year. The City Is At War, originally performed by Cobra Starship was featured on the Best of College A Cappella CD in 2009.

The Chordials went on their first international tour in June 2008. It was a sponsored trip around Germany in support of The Foundation for Women's Health, Research and Development, an organization which focuses on the prevention of female genital mutilation. The group performed over a ten-day period throughout Germany at private events, schools, castles, and in the streets of Frankfurt.

Over the summer of 2010, the Chordials traveled to Martha's Vineyard for a four-day summer tour and retreat. The group performed at the West Chop Club.

Shake The Poet, the Chordials' first EP was released at their Fall concert, "Crunkapella" on November 14, 2009. This first half of this EP was recorded and edited by alumnus James Cannon ('07) with the remainder being recorded by Steven Goldman of "Four Legs Records." Five of the six EP songs were mixed by Goldman, while the mixing of "Ramalama (Bang Bang)" was handled by alumnus James Cannon. Since its release, the six track EP has won Best Mixed Collegiate Song, Best Mixed Collegiate Soloist, and it was the runner up for Best Mixed Collegiate Album in the Contemporary A Cappella Recording Awards (CARA). "Use Somebody" was featured as the opening track on the 2010 Best of College A Cappella (BOCA) Compilation CD. Shake the Poet was chosen as a CASA Top Ten Mixed Collegiate Album Pick of the Year, and their cover of Ramalama (Bang Bang) was chosen to be featured on Sing VII: Lucky.

Their seventh studio recording, PULSE, was released on April 29, 2011, at Cocktail Hour XIV.

In the Spring of 2013, after almost a decade, the group returned to the ICCA stage, earning 3rd place overall at ICCA Finals in New York City.

In the Summer of 2013, the Chordials released their eighth studio album, the Shadow Aspect.

== Recent events ==
In February 2016, the Chordials released Surface. It was nominated for 3 CARA awards, winning Best Mixed Collegiate Solo and being the runner up for Best Mixed Collegiate Album. It is also featured on Voices Only 2016, Sing 13: SUPERSTITION, and is an RARB Pick of the Year.

On April 29, 2017, the Chordials celebrated their 20th anniversary at Cocktail Hour XX.

In the spring of 2018, the Chordials began the recordings for their EP, From Excavation. The EP was released on November 17, 2018, at the eighth anniversary of their After Hours concert. The idea behind this EP was to bring their vision of a cappella back to the bare basics, and to produce recordings with minimal added effects so as to focus on the beauty of purely vocal music.

On June 22, 2020, the Chordials released their latest album, Fire & Concrete.

== Awards ==
Year	Presenter	Award	Result
2001	ICCA Mid-Atlantic Quarterfinal	Best soloist	Winner, (Gabi Kornfeld)
2002	ICCA Mid-Atlantic Quarterfinal	Best choreography	Winner, (Randi Dublin and Jay Legaspi)
2003	ICCA Mid-Atlantic Quarterfinal	Overall	3rd place
2003	ICCA Mid-Atlantic Quarterfinal	Best soloist	Runner-up, (Jay Legaspi)
2004	ICCA Northeastern Quarterfinal	Overall	1st place
2004	ICCA Northeastern Quarterfinal	Best arrangement	Winner, (Sam Coffin)
2004	ICCA Northeastern Quarterfinal	Best choreography	Winner, (Jay Legaspi, Jackie Pribil, Felicia Williams)
2004	ICCA Northeastern Quarterfinal	Best vocal percussion	Winner, (Jay Legaspi)
2004	ICCA Northeastern Semifinal	Overall	1st place
2004	ICCA Northeastern Semifinal	Best choreography	Winner, (Jay Legaspi, Jackie Pribil, Felicia Williams)
2004	ICCA Northeastern Semifinal	Best soloist	Winner, (Felicia Williams)
2004	ICCA Finals	Overall	3rd place
2007	acaTunes Awards 2007	Favorite Tracks of the Year	"Let Me Entertain You" opb. Robbie Williams
2007	BOCA (Best of College A Cappella)	BOCA	"Photograph" opb. Nickelback
2007	RARB Picks	Pick of the Year	"Arrival"
2008	CARAs (Contemporary A Cappella Recording Awards)	Best Mixed Collegiate Album	Winner, (Arrival)
2008	CARAs (Contemporary A Cappella Recording Awards)	Best Mixed Collegiate Arrangement	Winner, (Brian Tarpinian - "Photograph")
2008	CARAs (Contemporary A Cappella Recording Awards)	Best Mixed Collegiate Soloist	Runner-up, (Rebecca Urbelis - "Farther Away")
2008	CARAs (Contemporary A Cappella Recording Awards)	Best Mixed Collegiate Song	Nominated, ("Swing Low, Sweet Chariot")
2009	BOCA (Best of College A Cappella)	BOCA	"The City Is at War" opb. Cobra Starship
2009	CARAs (Contemporary A Cappella Recording Awards)	Best Mixed Collegiate Album	Runner Up, (Smash)
2009	CARAs (Contemporary A Cappella Recording Awards)	Best Mixed Collegiate Arrangement	Nominated, (Ari Goldman - "The Moment I Said It")
2009	CARAs (Contemporary A Cappella Recording Awards)	Best Mixed Collegiate Soloist	Nominated, (Billy Ferguson - "Love Me Dead")
2009	CARAs (Contemporary A Cappella Recording Awards)	Best Mixed Collegiate Song	Nominated, ("Love Me Dead")
2009	CASA	SING V: Groovus	"The Moment I Said It" opb. Imogen Heap
2009	RARB Picks	Pick of the Year	"Smash"
2010	BOCA (Best of College A Cappella)	BOCA	"Use Somebody" opb. Kings of Leon
2010	CARAs (Contemporary A Cappella Recording Awards)	Best Mixed Collegiate Album	Runner Up, (Shake the Poet)
2010	CARAs (Contemporary A Cappella Recording Awards)	Best Mixed Collegiate Soloist	Winner, (Ariel Arbisser - "Cold Shoulder")
2010	CARAs (Contemporary A Cappella Recording Awards)	Best Mixed Collegiate Song	Winner, ("Ramalama (Bang Bang)")
2010	CASA Top Ten Mixed Collegiate Album Picks 2010	Top Ten Mixed Collegiate Album Picks (Pick of the Year)	"Shake the Poet"
2010	CASA A Cappella Community Awards	Favorite Collegiate Album	Runner Up, (Shake The Poet)
2010	CASA A Cappella Community Awards	Favorite Female Vocalist	Runner Up, (Ariel Arbisser)
2010	CASA A Cappella Community Awards	Favorite Mixed Collegiate Group	Nominated, (The Chordials)
2010	CASA A Cappella Community Awards	Favorite A Cappella Album Title	Nominated, (Shake The Poet)
2010	CASA A Cappella Community Awards	Favorite A Cappella Song	Nominated, (Ramalama (Bang Bang))
2010	CASA A Cappella Community Awards	Favorite Gender Bender Song/Solo	Nominated, (Cold Shoulder)
2010	CASA A Cappella Community Awards	Favorite Cutting Edge Group	Nominated, (The Chordials)
2010	CASA	SING 7: Lucky	"Ramalama (Bang Bang)" opb. Róisín Murphy
2011	CASA	SING 8: Too Cubed	"Cosmic Love" opb. Florence + the Machine
2011	Voices Only	Voices Only 2011	"What's a Girl Gotta Do?" opb. Basement Jaxx
2012	CARAs (Contemporary A Cappella Recording Awards)	Best Mixed Collegiate Album	Nominated, (Pulse)
2012	CARAs (Contemporary A Cappella Recording Awards)	Best Mixed Collegiate Soloist	Nominated, (Billy Ferguson - "Touch")
2012	CARAs (Contemporary A Cappella Recording Awards)	Best Mixed Collegiate Song	Nominated, ("Cosmic Love")
2012	Voices Only	Voices Only 2012	"Sincerely, Jane" opb. Janelle Monáe
2012	RARB Picks	Pick of the Year	Pulse
2012	RARB Picks	Song of the Year	"Papa Was A Rollin' Stone" opb. The Temptations
2012	RARB Picks	Song of the Year	"Sincerely, Jane" opb. Janelle Monáe
2013	ICCA Mid-Atlantic Quarterfinal	Outstanding Soloist	Winner, Jay Grollman ("Lies")
2013	ICCA Mid-Atlantic Quarterfinal	Overall	1st Place
2013	ICCA Mid-Atlantic Semifinal	Outstanding Soloist	Winner, Jay Grollman ("Lies")
2013	ICCA Mid-Atlantic Semifinal	Overall	1st Place
2013	ICCA Finals	Overall	3rd Place
2013	RARB Picks	Album of the Year	The Shadow Aspect
2013	CASA	Sing 10: Neon	“Bizness” opb. tUnE-yArDs
2014	CARA (Contemporary A Cappella Recording Awards)	Best Mixed Collegiate Album	Nominated, (The Shadow Aspect)
2014	CARA (Contemporary A Cappella Recording Awards)	Best Mixed Collegiate Song	Nominated, (“Lights”)
2014	CARA (Contemporary A Cappella Recording Awards)	Best Mixed Collegiate Arrangement	Nominated, (Shannon Lawrence – “Bizness”)
2014	Voices Only	Voices Only 2014	“Lies” opb. The Black Keys
2016	RARB Picks	Album of the Year	Surface
2016	RARB Picks	Track of the Year	“Retrograde” opb. James Blake
2016	CASA	Sing 13: SUPERSTITION	“Retrograde” opb. James Blake
2016	Voices Only	Voices Only 2016	“Haunted” opb. Beyonce
2017	CARAs (Contemporary A Cappella Recording Awards	Best Mixed Collegiate Arrangement	Nominated, (Harry Davis - “What Now”)
2017	CARAs (Contemporary A Cappella Recording Awards	Best Mixed Collegiate Solo	Winner, (Jay Grollman- "Retrograde”)
2017	CARAs (Contemporary A Cappella Recording Awards	Best Mixed Collegiate Album	Runner Up, (Surface)
2021	BOCA (Best of College A Cappella)	BOCA	"Commit Me" opb. Alex Boyd, apb. Suzy Jones
2021	CARA (Contemporary A Cappella Recording Awards)	Best Mixed Collegiate Song	Nominated, ("Bass Song")
2023	ICCA Central Quarterfinal #2	Outstanding Soloist	Winner, Katherine Xu ("In The Kitchen")
2023	ICCA Central Quarterfinal #2	Outstanding Vocal Percussion	Winner, Eddie Lacson

== Albums ==
=== Shaken, Not Stirred (1999) ===
1. One Fine Day
2. She Has A Girlfriend Now
3. That Lonesome Road
4. Independent Love Song
5. Return to Innocence
6. In the Still of the Night
7. Heaven
8. Sweet Surrender
9. Come on Eileen
10. And So It Goes
11. Come Go with Me
12. Killing Me Softly
13. Take On Me
14. Trippin' Billies
15. Dream

=== Not For Minors (2002) ===
1. Spiderwebs
2. The Lion Sleeps Tonight
3. Like a Prayer
4. Kate
5. Landslide
6. The Longest Time
7. Black Balloon
8. Linger
9. Bed of Lies
10. What a Feeling
11. With Arms Wide Open
12. Angel

=== The Third Chapter (2005) ===
1. All For Leyna/I Just Died in Your Arms Tonight
2. Bright Lights
3. Echo
4. Precious Things
5. I Heard It Through the Grapevine
6. Center of Attention
7. I'll Be Okay
8. Love You Madly
9. One Sweet Day
10. Alegria
11. You And I Both
12. Paper Bag
13. Please Don't Go
14. One By One/Circle of Life

=== Arrival (2007) ===
1. Let Me Entertain You
2. This Is How A Heart Breaks
3. Blurry
4. Breathe In
5. Farther Away
6. Chasing Cars
7. Who Knew
8. Waiting For You
9. Perfect Drug
10. Photograph
11. Swing Low, Sweet Chariot

=== Smash (2008) ===
1. Never Again
2. The City Is at War
3. Black and Gold
4. Nothin' Better to Do
5. Lithium
6. The Bird and the Worm
7. Die Alone
8. Sweep the Leg
9. Someone Else's Tomorrow
10. Mercy on Me
11. Love Me Dead
12. The Moment I Said It

=== Shake the Poet (2009) ===
1. Use Somebody
2. Cold Shoulder
3. God Put A Smile On Your Face
4. Ramalama (Bang Bang)
5. Decode
6. Soon We'll Be Found

=== Pulse (2011) ===
1. Sweet Disposition
2. Sincerely, Jane
3. The Other Side
4. Touch
5. What's a Girl Gotta Do
6. Rolling in the Deep
7. Smile for the Paparazzi
8. Papa Was a Rollin' Stone
9. Skipping Stone
10. Pantomime
11. Cosmic Love

=== Digital singles (2013) ===
1. Lights
2. Barton Hollow

=== The Shadow Aspect (2013) ===
1. Lights
2. Plain Gold Ring
3. Save Me
4. Lost in the World
5. Face of Light
6. Barton Hollow
7. Bizness
8. Lies
9. Too Close
10. My Kind of Love
11. The Cave
12. The Light
13. Nothing But the Water

=== Surface (2016) ===
1. Haunted
2. Breath of Life
3. Lovely Day
4. Moving On
5. Retrograde
6. Choices
7. Waters
8. The Chain
9. Trembling Hands
10. You Know Where To Find Me
11. It's About Time
12. What Now

=== From Excavation (2018) ===
1. 8 (Circle)
2. Bass Song
3. Hideaway

=== Fire & Concrete (2020) ===
1. Bass Song
2. When the Party's Over
3. I Warned Myself
4. 8 (Circle)
5. Omens
6. Commit Me
7. Hideaway
8. We Won't Run

== See also ==
- Cornell University
- Collegiate a cappella
