= Eight Beat Measure =

Collegiate a cappella group

- Years active: 1987–present
- Label: A Cappella
- Website: 8beat.org

Eight Beat Measure is the oldest Tenor-Baritone-Bass collegiate a cappella group at the Rochester Institute of Technology (RIT).

Eight Beat Measure began in 1987 as the RIT Men's Octet. Originally faculty-led and formed as an extension to the RIT Singers, the RIT Men's Octet quickly expanded their horizons and branched into the world of contemporary a cappella. They changed their name to Eight Beat Measure to reflect their new attitude, and expanded from their original eight members. The group's current repertoire consists of songs in the pop, R&B, and indie genres.

== Current members ==
Name	Main Voice Part	Leadership Position	Graduation Year
Matthew Kelsey	Tenor I	Music Director	2026
Jack Papel	Tenor I	Calendar Man	2026
Anna Widger	Tenor I	Choreographer	2028
John Aslanes	Tenor II		2027
David Niemi	Tenor II		2027
Ben Samuels	Tenor II		2028
Cameron Wiseman	Tenor II		2028
Christian Deas	Baritone	Assistant Music Director	2029
Lucas Kline	Baritone		2030
Anjan Maharjan	Baritone		2026
Asher Philyaw	Baritone	Social Media Manager	2030
Evan Sukhenko	Baritone		2029
Thomas Versantvoort	Baritone	Business Manager	2029
Andre	Bass		2027
Jackie Green	Bass	President	2029
Logan Mui	Bass		2026

== Discography ==
=== Polarized (2016) ===
#	Title	Original artist	Soloist
1.	Bound 2	Kanye West	Andrew Lanos
2.	Fascinated	FreeSol ft. Justin Timberlake	Andrew Athias & Mike Purcell
3.	Hold On, We're Going Home	Drake	Richard Toro
4.	Talk Dirty	Jason Derulo	Andrew Athias
5.	Scream	Usher	Andrew Athias
6.	Brand New Jones	Thicke	Randy Duke
7.	Boogie Nights	Heatwave	Andrew Lanos & Richard Toro
8.	Jealous	Chromeo	Deshawn Cervi
9.	All of Me	John Legend	Andrew Lanos
10.	Uptown Funk	Mark Ronson ft. Bruno Mars	Randy Duke
11.	She Came To Give It To You	Usher ft. Nicki Minaj	Randy Duke

RARB Review: http://www.rarb.org/reviews/albums/1600-polarized/

=== Heatin' Up (2012) ===
#	Title	Original artist	Soloist
1.	Party Rock Anthem	LMFAO	Joe Kaplan/Mike Purcell
2.	Just Say Yes	Snow Patrol	Ryan Vazquez
3.	Sarah Smiles	Panic At The Disco	Ryan Belair
4.	I Will Follow You Into The Dark	Death Cab For Cutie	Jack Kelleher
5.	A Dios Le Pido	Juanes	Joe Kaplan
6.	Carry Out	Timberland & Justin Timberlake	Rohit Crasta/Andrew Darling
7.	The Cave	Mumford & Sons	Justin Bartlett
8.	Lego House	Ed Sheeran	Andrew Darling
9.	Confessions	Usher	Andrew Athias
10.	Unnatural Selection	Muse	Andrew Darling
11.	Tears In Heaven	Eric Clapton	Andrew Darling
12.	It Had Better Be Tonight	Michael Bublé	Ryan Belair
13.	Won't Get Fooled Again	The Who	Jack Kelleher

=== No Safety Nets (2010) ===
#	Title	Original artist	Soloist
1.	Don't Trust Me	3OH!3	Joe Kaplan/RJ Pollard
2.	Haven't Met You Yet	Michael Bublé	Ryan Belair
3.	Honor Him/Now We Are Free	Gladiator OST	Rohit Crasta
4.	Assassin	Muse	Bradley Turnbull
5.	Viva La Vida	Coldplay	RJ Pollard
6.	Hard Rock Hallelujah	Lordi	Rick Thomas
7.	Lost+	Coldplay/Jay-Z	Josh Goodman/Kwadwo Opong-Mensah
8.	Supermassive Reckoner	Muse/Radiohead	Joe Kaplan/Bradley Turnbull
9.	Doug Theme Song	Nickelodeon	

=== Mix 2006 ===
#	Title
1.	Picture Perfect
2.	Message
3.	16 Tons
4.	Fiddler's Hymn
5.	More Than Words
6.	Knocks Me Off My Feet
7.	Do You Fear the Wind
8.	Seven Bridges
9.	Battle of Jericho
10.	Coney Island
11.	Come Go With Me

=== Sleepless Nights ===
#	Title
1.	Drive By
2.	Break My Stride
3.	And So It Goes
4.	My Old Man
5.	Spiderman
6.	Yesterday
7.	Insomniac
8.	Shipoopi
9.	In the Still of the Night
10.	You Can Call Me Al
11.	The Girl is Good
12.	It's the End of the World as We Know It

== Awards ==
- 2021 Voices Only - I'm Still Standing (Soloist: Jon Frey) was placed on Voices Only 2021
- 2019 ICCA Quarterfinals First Place, Outstanding Soloists (Derek Gieraltowski, Jarell Green)
- 2017 CARA - Best Hip-Hop/R&B Album (Polarized)
- 2013 BOCA - Party Rock Anthem (Soloists: Mike Purcell and Joe Kaplan ) was placed as the opening track on BOCA 2013
- 2013 Voices Only- Panic Station (Soloist: Jack Kelleher) was placed on Voices Only 2013
- 2012 Voices Only- Carry Out (Soloists: Rohit Crasta & Andrew Darling) was placed on Voices Only 2012
- 2011 SMACC Down - First Place, Best Arrangement (Bradley Turnbull, Honor Him/Now We Are Free), Best Choreography (Josh Goodman, It Had Better Be Tonight)
- 2011 CARA Nomination - Best Collegiate Male Arrangement (Bradley Turnbull, Honor Him/Now We Are Free)
- 2011 ACA Nomination - Favorite Album Art (No Safety Nets)
- 2011 ACA Nomination - Favorite Breakout or Newcomer Group
