= The Trojan Men =

American a cappella musical group

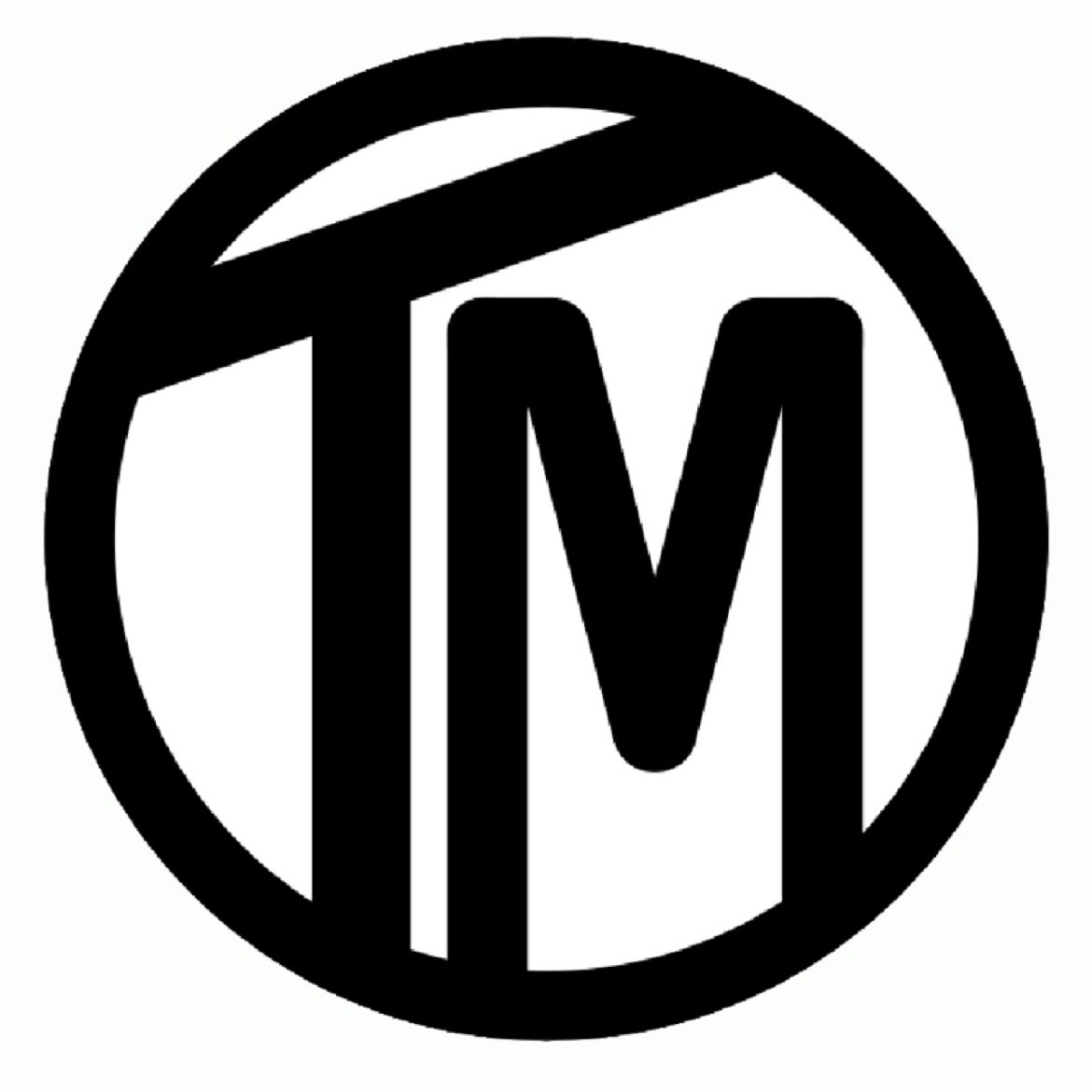

Background information
- Origin: University of Southern California
- Genre: A Cappella
- Years active: 2005–present
- Members: Henry Masin; Theo Herrin; Chris Apy; Duck Brown; Raku Kadoi; Armaan Al Hussain; Nico Bennett; Owen Moore; Conor Hernandez; Brayden Mierek; Tejis Lodato; Ashir Ouseph

The Trojan Men ("The Men") is an a cappella group at the University of Southern California. Founded in 2005, the group has participated in and earned numerous awards from competitions such as the International Championship of Collegiate A Cappella and USC's Absolut A Cappella contest. The group currently performs around USC, Los Angeles, and the Long Beach area.

== History ==
The Trojan Men were founded in January 2005 by then-freshman Evan Bregman. Nine people auditioned in the initial stages, and the group had its first performance on March 3, 2005, with five members. They sang three songs: "In the Still of the Night", "If I Ever Fall in Love", and Bregman's original arrangement of "California, Here I Come".

The group has grown steadily in number and popularity. In 2006, they competed in the ICCA for the first time, placing third in their quarterfinal behind BYU Noteworthy and that year's eventual International Champions, BYU Vocal Point. They were also honored with a Best Soloist award. That same year, they competed in USC's annual Absolut A Cappella contest, placing in first above ICCA finalist USC Reverse Osmosis. Again, they were honored with a Best Soloist award.

The group is famous for their tradition of singing "Alfred the Alligator" before every single rehearsal.

=== 2006–2007 ===
With momentum building around them on campus, The Trojan Men spent the Fall 2006 semester preparing a specialty repertoire of multi-denominational Holiday music. This culminated in their first annual Holiday Concert on December 3, 2006. Eschewing the established campus format of concerts with multiple groups singing only four or five songs, the concert featured only The Trojan Men singing a dozen songs. Many of these songs have since gained popularity through the group's YouTube Channel.

The following semester, the group competed in the ICCAs again, placing third in their quarterfinal and again winning a Best Soloist award. In that year's Absolut A Cappella contest, they placed third as well.

=== 2007–2008 ===
In the final year of the group's founding members, the focus turned to establishing the group as a sustainable entity on campus. The fall 2007 semester saw 45 auditionees. One week later, the group was the featured performer and clinician at the second annual Las Vegas A Cappella Summit.

Continuing the trend of breaking with established USC a cappella tradition, the group scheduled their first concert of the semester one week after other campus groups, associating it with USC's Homecoming festivities and again performing a dozen songs. At the concert, the group announced that their second annual Holiday Concert would be the first by a USC a cappella group to be held in Bovard Auditorium with a small admission fee.

The second annual Holiday Concert was held on December 6, 2007. Nearly 500 people were in attendance as The Trojan Men performed 20 songs, a total of 90 minutes of music capped by two short videos. The concert was recorded for a future CD and DVD release. The group self-financed the entire show using funds acquired from previous performances and private donations.

The spring semester of 2008 was focused on recording the group's debut album, Take Root. The album was released May 4, 2008, the night of the group's end of the year spring concert held again in Bovard Auditorium.

=== 2016–2017 ===
The Trojan Men actively performed around the Los Angeles area. While they still performed classic songs including Etta James' "At Last" and Corinne Bailey Rae's "Put Your Records On," they constantly cycled through new material to be performed for friends, family, and fans.

The group no longer competed in competitions.

=== 2017–2018 ===
The Men performed a 13th anniversary "Bar Mitzvah" concert, performing songs from the years of the group's birth. Highlights included Vanessa Carlton's "A Thousand Miles", Owl City's "Fireflies", and The Jonas Brothers' "Year 3000". New arrangements from Colin Petersdorf, Landon Fadel, and Austin Karkowsky brought a new energy to the group and its audience.

For the first time in the group's history, The Trojan Men performed their winter concert with The Sirens, USC's only all-female a cappella group.

=== 2018–2019 ===
In January, the group sang the National Anthem for a USC Basketball game and learned a record 21 arrangements in the semester. With Ben Shiff, Gerry Hartman, Joey Blundell, and Stephen Jung emerging as new arrangers, the growing group continued to expand their repertoire.

=== 2019–2020 ===
The group welcomed Alex Oliva, Sam Guillemette, Nick Springer, and Avery Streater into the group. One song of the year was Dancing in the Moonlight.

=== 2020–2021 ===
Following the suspension of all in-person activities at the University of Southern California in response to the COVID-19 pandemic, membership dwindled and participation was at an all-time low. Attempts to record and produce videos of each individual member stitched together were unsuccessful, and like most artistic clubs and a cappella groups on campus, The Trojan Men were on the brink of breaking up.

President and vice-president Timothy Reilly and Luke Sobolevitch, respectively, were determined to bring the group back to its former skill and prestige. With the commencement of the fall 2021 semester, members past-and-present assembled and performed at that semester's All-Hail Showcase. The exposure the showcase offered brought many new prospective members, and following the audition process, the group stood at 13. The Trojan Men once again performed their winter concert with The Sirens, featuring arrangements of Perfect and I Wanna Dance with Somebody (Who Loves Me).

=== 2021–2022 ===
The Trojan men gained 10 new members during their 2021–2022 season. George Vagujhelyi, Daniel Marable, Strad Slater, Siddhant Bajaj, Ethan Kaiser and Thomas Colglazier all became members of the all male A-Capella group. The group went on to have several performance opportunities — including their winter and spring concert. The group was also given the opportunity to perform at the banquet for USC School of Pharmacy.

=== 2022–2023 ===
For both Fall and Spring semesters, 8 new members joined the group: Bryce Rayen, Tripp Carrington, Iain Tarves, Sam Skarin, Jonathan Liu, Arjun Lakshman, and Victor Falcon. The group had several performances including All Hail, Acapalooza in Las Vegas, Winter Concert with the Sirens, Songfest, and Spring Concert. The notable arrangements include: Harry Styles, Elvis, and Disney medleys, "Bad Guy" x "Old Town Road" Mashup, and Elton John's "Yellow Brick Road." The group also debuted an original arrangement of The Beatles' song "Drive My Car" by Iain Tarves.

=== 2023–2024 ===
On the way to the group's retreat in Carlsbad, members Daniel Marable, Iain Tarves, Jonathan Liu, and Henry Masin sang the Chili's Baby Back Ribs song in front of a Chili's location and posted the video to The Trojan Men Instagram. Chili's commented on the post.

=== 2025–2026 ===
The Trojan Men went viral.

== Presidents ==
President	From	To
Evan Bregman	Spring 2005	Spring 2008
Eitan Nir	Fall 2008	Spring 2009
Cy Serrano	Fall 2009	Spring 2010
Martin Sung	Fall 2010	Spring 2011
Aaron Kwan	Fall 2011	Spring 2012
Kevin Rutkowski	Fall 2012	Spring 2013
Micah O'Konis	Fall 2013	Spring 2015
Chasen Washington	Fall 2015	Fall 2016
Clint Blakely	Spring 2017	Spring 2017
Deven Martin & Landon Fadel	Fall 2017	Fall 2017
Landon Fadel	Spring 2018	Fall 2018
Austin Karkowsky	Spring 2019	Fall 2020
Luke Sobolevitch	Spring 2021	Spring 2021
Tim Reilly	Fall 2021	Spring 2022
Daniel Marable	Fall 2022	Spring 2024
Tripp Carrington	Fall 2024	Spring 2026
Henry Masin	Fall 2026	Spring 2027
Duck Brown	Fall 2027	Future

== Albums ==
The group recorded their first album at Asylum Studios, home of singer-songwriter and a cappella producer Gabriel Mann, engineered by Chris Harrison, former director of UCLA Awaken A Cappella.

Take Root (2008)
Take Root (2008): Studio Album; Released: May 4, 2008	Tracks: 1. Don't Stop Me Now (Queen); 2. Bless the Broken Road (Rascal Flatts); 3. I Wish (Stevie Wonder); 4. The Blower's Daughter (Damien Rice); 5. Insomniac (Billy Pilgrim); 6. Because (The Beatles); 7. Change in My Life (Rockapella); 8. Rocksteady (Marc Broussard); 9. Can't Take My Eyes Off You (Frankie Valli); 10. I Didn't Understand (Elliott Smith); 11. My Mistake (Evan Bregman); 12. I Want You Back (Jackson 5); 13. Somewhere Out There (Live) (from the movie An American Tail); 14. Shout (The Isley Brothers)

== Awards ==
=== 2006 ===
- 3rd Place – ICCA quarterfinal
  - Best Soloist: Evan Bregman on Shout (Parts 1&2)
- 1st Place – Absolut A Cappella
  - Best Soloist: Evan Bregman on Shout (Parts 1&2)

=== 2007 ===
- 3rd Place – ICCA quarterfinal
  - Best Soloist: Tien Nguyen on Don't Stop Me Now
- 3rd Place – Absolut A Cappella
  - Best Performance: Tien Nguyen on Don't Stop Me Now

=== 2008 ===
- 2nd Place – Absolut A Cappella
  - Best Soloists: The Trojan Men on Justin Timberlake Medley

=== 2009 ===
- 1st Place – Absolut A Cappella
  - Best Arrangement: Cy Serrano on Ribbon in the Sky

=== 2019 ===
- 1st Place – The Big Final A Cappella Show
  - Best to Ever Do It: The Trojan Men

=== 2024 ===
- Trojan's Choice Award – Songfest

=== 2026 ===
- 3rd Place – Songfest
