= Deep Treble =

Rutgers University a cappella group

Deep Treble is the premier co-ed a cappella group at Rutgers University in New Brunswick. The group was founded in September, 1998 by Hanna Schwartz, a then-sophomore in Rutgers College and Jordan Ullman, a then-graduate student at the Rutgers University School of Education. It was the fifth co-ed A Cappella group on campus and since its inception, has been entirely student-run. The group travels across the eastern seaboard, and has participated in the International Championship of Collegiate A Cappella several times, making it to the finals twice and picking up several awards along the way. They recently celebrated their 25th Anniversary Season.

== Current members ==
- Soprano
  - Sana Khurana '29
  - Nitya Busannagari '28 (Assistant Business Manager)
  - Nicole Faith Lee '30
  - Medha Valluri '27 (Communications Chair)
- Alto
  - Jane Herman '28 (Business Manager)
  - Murchhona Dasgupta '27 (Treasurer)
  - Tejaswi Jeyanthinathan ‘27
- Tenor
  - Maxwell Kumahor '29
  - Vihaan Agarwal '27
- Baritone
  - Prashasth Turaga '28 (Music Director)
  - Jack Feldman '29
  - Baldwin Shields '29
- Bass
  - Ajani Grady-Willis '29
  - Aiden Feng '29 (Social Media Manager)
  - Marcus Peña '28 (Assistant Music Director)

== History ==
=== Conception and Early Beginnings (1998-2001) ===
In 1998, Deep Treble was founded as the first secular a cappella group at Rutgers. The 2000-2001 school year was a big one for Deep Treble. December's concert in Trayes Hall proved the biggest yet, with over 350 music lovers showing up. In January, Deep Treble began work on its first album, "All Kinds of Treble," set to be released in the Fall of 2001. April marked the first time Deep Treble performed in Nicholas Music Center at the Mason Gross School of the Arts.

2000-2001 was also the first year Deep Treble was accepted into the International Championship of Collegiate A Cappella (ICCAs). After placing second in the Northeast Quarterfinals at Tufts University in Boston, Deep Treble won the Northeast Semifinals at the University of Connecticut in Storrs, Connecticut. This win sent Deep Treble to Avery Fischer Hall in Lincoln Center in New York City for the International Finals. Along the way, Deep Treble picked up many awards, including two to Jordan Ullman for his arrangements, a vocal percussion award to Brian Chambers, a vocal percussion award to Jeremy Schafer, and best vocalist awards for the sisters Rabie and Rachel Wohl.

In the Fall of 2001 Deep Treble released its self-produced debut album, "All Kinds of Treble." In the Spring of 2002, Deep Treble took first place in the ICCA Mid-Atlantic Quarterfinals. Brian Chambers picked up an arrangement award for "Regulate/I Keep Forgettin'," while Minna Urrey won the Outstanding Soloist Award for "Jersey Girl." At the Semifinals, Deep Treble took third place and multi-talented Brian took home the award for best percussionist.

=== Another Go at International Acclaim (2007-present) ===
After a few years off the competition circuit, Deep Treble decided to compete again in the ICCAs in 2007. Under the musical direction of Viraj Lal, DT placed second in the Mid Atlantic Regional at Drexel winning the award for Best Choreography. Rutgers hosted the Semifinals and won first place, in addition to a Best Soloist Award for Yaa Acheampong’s rendition of “Janie’s Got a Gun” and Best Vocal Percussion by Jessica Totaro. This win marked the second time Deep Treble reached a berth at the Finals in Lincoln Center. DT starred in a television segment on NJN for its tremendous success. That summer, Deep Treble recorded its third album. Take the Cake, launched in Spring 2008 with a huge Cake-celebration, earned accolades, rave reviews, and proved to be the most successful album for the group yet.

On December 13, 2008, Deep Treble celebrated its 10th anniversary in style. First, there was a reunion providing a great chance for current members to connect with alumni and a great opportunity for alumni to reconnect with old friends. At the reunion, the Deep Trebles of past and present relived old songs under the guidance and leadership of the original arrangers, past musical directors, and many of the original soloists. Subsequently, the 10th Anniversary Concert featured the alumni clad in black with a splash of red singing “Beautiful,” “Janie’s Got a Gun,” with Candice Helfand, “Let Go,” with Melanie Kim, “Under the Bridge,” with Kenny Karnas, “Always Be My Baby,” with Gia Wright, “The Whole World Together,” with Jason Troost, Matt LaFargue, Uton Onyejekwe, and Travis Nilan, and “The Remedy,” featuring Travis Nilan. The alumni even sang a song by themselves: “If You Could Only See” with Uton Onyejekwe. As a result of the event, Deep Treble established the position of Historian to maintain contact with the alumni and to preserve documentation of the concerts.

The competition season of Spring 2009 proved to be one of Deep Treble’s hardest and triumphant. The competition set included two new songs, and DT’s membership included seven new members. Under the musical direction of Julia Fendler, DT overcame these difficult odds and placed second in the Mid Atlantic Quarterfinals at RPI, picking up an award for Best Arrangement by Alexandra Bancroft for her mash-up, “Unfaithful Apology.” Rutgers, once again, hosted Semifinals, and Christofer Peckhardt earned the award for Best Soloist of “Beautiful Child.” In 2011 and 2012, Deep Treble returned to the ICCAs and although they did make it to the Semi-Finals, they took home Best Soloist awards both years for "Rock Medley" Arranged by Galdriel Sevener '12 and sung by Tyler Picone '14, and a return of "Beautiful Child" arranged by Kenneth Feibush and also sung by Tyler Picone. The group also took home the award for best vocal percussion in 2011 awarded to Charles Salamone '12.

In May 2013, Deep Treble celebrated their 15th anniversary in style where it all began, at Kirkpatrick Chapel where the first Deep Treble concert was performed. The group had a small get together beforehand to meet and socialize with alumni and performed several songs with alumni such as: "All These Things" "The Remedy" "Your Ex-Lover is Dead" "The Sign" and Unfaithful Apology".

In the milestone year of their 25th anniversary, Deep Treble released their album "Roots" in 2023 with songs tracked by Michael Lazarow '23. The following year, 2024, Deep Treble rejoiced in a triumphant return to the ICCA stage, following a five-year hiatus prompted by the challenges of the COVID-19 pandemic. The comeback culminated in an impressive second-place finish at the Mid-Atlantic Quarterfinals. Notably, Sam Fred '25 received the Outstanding Soloist award for "Pray," arranged by Shreyas Basu '26.

'Deep Treble' has firmly established its place within Rutgers University and the 'a cappella' music community. Beyond their musical performances, the group is a regular presence at various campus charity events, concerts, and other functions. Our alumni—who are now thriving as lawyers, physicians, professional musicians, music arrangers, or educators—still make time to return to hit the stage with 'Deep Treble' and participate in truly unforgettable performances. Although the future remains a mystery, the horizon ahead is bright with optimism—thanks to our new members, vibrant melodies, competition victories, and our albums. The path forward for ‘Deep Treble’ appears to be full of great promise.

== Awards ==
- ICCA 2001 Northeast Quarterfinals: 2nd Place
- ICCA 2001 Northeast Semifinals: 1st Place
- ICCA 2001 Finals: 4th Place
  - Outstanding Solo: Rebecca and Rachel Wohl
  - Outstanding Arrangement: "Sweet Child o' Mine"
  - Outstanding Vocal Percussion: Jeremy Schafer
- ICCA 2002 Mid-Atlantic Quarterfinals: 1st Place
  - Outstanding Arrangement: "Regulate/I Keep Forgettin'"
  - Outstanding Solo: Minna Urrey: "Jersey Girl"
- ICCA 2002 Mid-Atlantic Semifinals: 3rd Place
  - Outstanding Vocal Percussion: Brian Chambers
- ICCA 2004 Mid-Atlantic Quarterfinals: 3rd Place
  - Best Choreo
- ICCA 2007 Mid-Atlantic Quarterfinals: 2nd Place
  - Outstanding Choreography
- ICCA 2007 Mid-Atlantic Semifinals: 1st Place
  - Best Soloist: Yaa Acheampong for "Janie's Got A Gun"
  - Outstanding Vocal Percussion: Jessica Totaro
- ICCA 2009 Mid-Atlantic Quarterfinals: 2nd Place
  - Outstanding Arrangement: Alexandra Bancroft
- ICCA 2009 Mid-Atlantic Semifinals
  - Outstanding Soloist: Christofer Peckhardt for "Beautiful Child"
- ICCA 2011 Mid-Atlantic Quarterfinals
  - Outstanding Soloist: Tyler Picone for "Rock Medley"
  - Outstanding Vocal Percussion: Charles Salamone
- ICCA 2012 Mid-Atlantic Quarterfinals
  - Outstanding Soloist: Tyler Picone for "Beautiful Child"
- ICCA 2024 Mid-Atlantic Quarterfinals: 2nd Place
  - Outstanding Soloist: Sam Fred for "Pray"

== Discography ==
- 2001- "All Kinds of Treble"
- 2006- "Hooked"
- 2008- "Take The Cake"
- 2012- "Rock This Way"
- 2016- "41 Jones"
- 2018- "Grown The Spring EP"
- 2023- “Roots”
