= Out of the Blue (Yale University) =

Yale University a cappella vocal group

Background information
- Also known as: OOTB
- Origin: Yale University
- Genres: Pop rock a cappella
- Years active: 1986-present
- Label: Independent
- Members: Soprano; Lily Goren '27; Emma Cantu '27; Bebhinn Knudsen '27; Corinne Laurey '29; Hannah Shinder '29 Alto; Rivkah Lahav '28; Lillie Hickey '29; Hadley Murphey '29 Tenor; James Tibang '27; Jeffrey Yang '28; Trong Ho '28; Quinton Moats '28; Emmanuel Edebiri '29 Bass; J.T. Timmers '27; Ashton Zheng '27; Lyndon Chen '28; Julian Dans '29
- Website: yaleootb.com

Out of the Blue (sometimes abbreviated as OOTB, pronounced OOT-Buh) is a co-ed a cappella group from Yale University. Out of the Blue's repertoire includes music that spans 50 years and several genres, including pop, folk, and R&B. The group has won multiple a cappella competitions, awards, and accolades, shared the stage with Ben Folds and Sister Hazel, and performed for audiences all over the world. Out of the Blue records a full-length studio album every two years. The group's seventeenth studio album, In My Bed, was released in August 2024.

== History ==
In 1986, a group of eight students determined to create a new brand of Yale a cappella founded a vocal jazz group called "Untapped Potential." In 1988, the group changed its name to Out of the Blue and joined Yale's Singing Group Council, the organization responsible for facilitating relationships between Yale's 15 undergraduate a cappella groups and the college as a whole.

Today, Out of the Blue comprises around 21 students who arrange and sing songs from a list of classic pop, rock, folk, R&B, jazz, and techno. Most members join the group as first-years and leave the group at the beginning of their senior year, after a traditional Family Weekend concert featuring the group's newest members. Out of the Blue has a large community of alumni that often attend the current group's concerts.. The group sings their closing song, Steve Winwood's "Higher Love," at almost every concert. The group also invites alumni in the audience to sing their traditional closing song, "The Irish Blessing," any time they attend a concert.

== Rush ==
As a member of Yale's Singing Group Council, Out of the Blue follows the standard procedure for Rush, the audition process at Yale. Over the course of two short performances, prospective singers can sample the group, and decide whether or not to sign up for an audition. Rush may take anywhere from two weeks to a month, over the course of which all the a cappella groups associated with the Singing Group Council hold auditions, rush meals, singing desserts, and callbacks. The process culminates in Tap Night, an event in which every a cappella group lines up at High Street Gate on Old Campus and hurries to induct the prospective singers into their group. In 2023, Out of the Blue tapped eight new members from the class of 2027.

== Tours ==
Out of the Blue has performed in diverse and exotic venues, from the United States Embassy in Singapore to Madison Square Garden in New York City. The group has opened for major recording artists like Ben Folds and Sister Hazel and performed for royalty, diplomats, Nobel Laureates, and U.S. Supreme Court Justices. In addition to performances, OOTB leads master classes for students all over the world, many of which have inspired children to start their own school a cappella groups. The group recorded their first full-length studio album in 1990, entitled "No Rough Edges." Each year, the group embarks on two to three regional or international tours. Past tour destinations have included Los Angeles, Ukraine, London, Singapore, Rio de Janeiro, Washington D.C., Geneva., Hong Kong, and India

== Discography ==
- In My Bed (2024)
- Late Nights (2021)
- Hide & Seek (2017)
- 120 (2015)
- Split the Dark (2013)
- Brand New Walk (EP) (2012)
- 16 Edgewood (2011)
- Getting Wise (2009)
- Morning Evening Everything (2007)
- No Pun Intended (2005)
- Soaked To The Skin (2003)
- Phraseology (2001)
- Exit 7 (1999)
- Christmas at Yale (1997)
- On Tap (1997)
- Stealing Spoons (1993)
- No Rough Edges (1990)

== Leadership ==
Musical Leadership
Corinne Laurey '29 (Pitch)
Julian Dans '29 (Assistant Pitch)
Quinton Moats '28 (Assistant Pitch)

Business Managers
Lillie Hickey '29
Trong Ho '28

== Accolades ==
Out of the Blue was named Northeast Champion at the 2012 International Championship of Collegiate A Cappella, where they also won Best Choreography and Best Arrangement. The group has appeared on compilation albums featuring the best of collegiate and professional a cappella and won recognition and awards from the Contemporary A Cappella Society (CASA) multiple times, most recently appearing on CASA's 2013 compilation album, Sing 10: Neon.

The group placed first in Bristol Recording Studio's A Cappella Armageddon 2013, marking Out of the Blue's first competitive win of the 2013–2014 season.
