= Not Too Sharp =

American university a cappella group

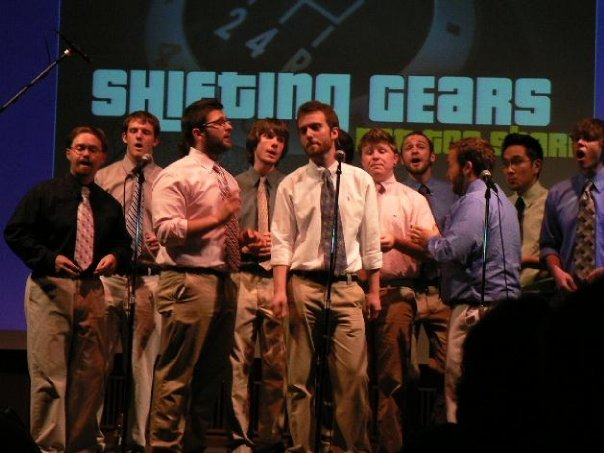
- Not Too Sharp's Spring 2009 Big Show

Background information
- Origin: Durham, New Hampshire
- Genres: A cappella, Pop
- Years active: 2002–present
- Members: Matt Derrick; Gus Muscato; Nate Sullivan; Jeremiah Friedman; Zach Hertrich; Alex Natario; Nick Valhouli; Curtis Belanger; Michael Crowley; Sung-ki Carty; Dierdre Smith
- Website: not2sharp.com

Not Too Sharp is an all-male a cappella group from the University of New Hampshire in Durham, New Hampshire, USA. Begun in 2002, the 9-12 man group performs live on the college campus, at other groups’ venues, and in the New Hampshire community. Their annual benefit show supports the American Cancer Society. The ensemble has previously competed twice in the International Championship of Collegiate A Cappella in 2015 and 2018. The Recorded Acappella Review Board says of Not Too Sharp, “All male, and possessed of an infectious energy.” In 2010, the group was presented with a "Best of New Hampshire" award for contemporary a cappella.

== History ==
UNH students Jamie Saucier, Jason Reed, and Kevin Cleary conceived the group during a trip with the UNH Chorus to perform background vocals at a Barry Manilow concert. A discussion of a classmate who had been diagnosed with multiple myeloma, an incurable but treatable cancer, led them to form a group who could perform to raise money for cancer research. That friend later became the group's first business manager, and only female member.

The group was barbershop-based in its early days, something that could distinguish them from the other a cappella groups on campus at the time. Their first show was held in the basement floor of Congreve Hall in 2002. The group rehearsed during the walk across campus, and relied on paper music during the show. This was the first of over 25 performances during their inaugural year. The group's first major concert was held May 3, 2003, in UNH's Johnson Theatre, hosted by members of fellow group Alabaster Blue. Over 200 people attended this first show, raising $2,000 for the American Cancer Society. It was also when the group debuted its first album, On Our Way, which consisted of many traditional barbershop arrangements, recorded live in the MUB Theater.

Since its first year, the group has continued to perform live around the region. Each year they have hosted a benefit show, adding to the total donated to cancer research, and building ties with other initiatives like UNH's Wildcat Santa toy drive.

A self-titled album released in 2006 reflected the group's growing interest in popular modern music. The 2009 album Shifting Gears furthered the group's move away from its traditional barbershop roots.

In 2011, the group went back to the studio to record their third studio album entitled May Contain Nuts. The group made its first break into the national a cappella scene with their take on Elvis Presley's "Rubberneckin'". It was selected for the national collegiate a cappella compilation album Voices Only 2012 and featured the entire group with an arrangement by Mark Taipan.

In 2013 the group released the album Haywire. They received a Contemporary A Cappella Recording Award nomination for Not Too Sharp's first original song, "Electric", with a solo by Anthony Richards, written by members Eric Schaaf and Jim McCann, and co-written by producer David Longo. In 2014, Not Too Sharp was placed on Voices Only 2014 with their cover of The Crash Kings' "Mountain Man".

During the 2014-2015 academic year, the group appeared on The Today Show with Kathie Lee and Hoda, and sang at the inauguration of NH Governor Maggie Hassan. The group also released a music video for their cover of Rusted Root's 'Send Me On My Way' that achieved semi-virality, accumulating over 100,000 views within a year of its release. The group also released a single, their cover of Darius Rucker's version of "Wagon Wheel". Lastly, the group won Organization of the Year, as awarded by the MUB Office of Student Involvement and Leadership.

== Philanthropy ==
An annual benefit concert raises money for the American Cancer Society. The shows generated approximately $10,000 for the ACS in just the group's first five years.

== Discography ==
Album	Tracks
On Our Way: Released: December 5, 2003	1. "Trashin' the Camp"; 2. "For We're Just Good-Looking Fellows"; 3. "Take Me Out to the Ballgame"; 4. "My Old Man"; 5. "Hotel California"; 6. "Kiss the Girl"; 7. "Baby on Board"; 8. "In the Still of the Night"; 9. "My Country 'tis of Thee"; 10. "If I Could, I Would"; 11. "My Old New Hampshire Home"; 12. "The Lazy Boy"; 13. "Crazy for This Girl"; 14. "Bubble Toes"; 15. "That Lonesome Road"; 16. "The Longest Time"; 17. "Goodnight Ladies"; 18. "Earth Angel (Bonus Track)"; 19. "Happy Birthday (Bonus Track)"; 20. "My Baby Loves a Bunch of Authors (Bonus Track)"; 21. "Sha-Boom (Bonus Track)"
Not Too Sharp: Released: December 8, 2006	1. "Sugar, We're Going Down"; 2. "Soul Man"; 3. "I'm in a Hurry"; 4. "Chordbuster's March"; 5. "Demons"; 6. "That's What Friends Are For"; 7. "eBay"; 8. "Brightly Beams Our Father's Mercy"; 9. "The World I Know"; 10. "Hotel California"
Shifting Gears: Released: May 8, 2009	1. "Street Corner Symphony"; 2. "Take Me Home Tonight"; 3. "Draggin' the Line"; 4. "What Hurts the Most"; 5. "I Melt with You"; 6. "Black Water"; 7. "Happier"; 8. "Chasing Cars"; 9. "Died in Your Arms Tonight"; 10. "The Underdog"; 11. "Gone"
May Contain Nuts: Released: December 9, 2011	1. "Rubberneckin'"; 2. "Rock & Roll"; 3. "All for You"; 4. "Come on Get Higher"; 5. "You Are the Best Thing"; 6. "Waiting on the World to Change"; 7. "Take Me Home"; 8. "Grade 9"; 9. "Big Yellow Taxi"; 10. "St. Louis Blues/Superstition"
Haywire: Released: November 7, 2013	1. "Beginnings"; 2. "The A Team"; 3. "Electric" (original); 4. "Send Me On My Way"; 5. "Madness"; 6. "State of The Art"; 7. "What is Hip?"; 8. "Fine By Me"; 9. "She's So Mean"; 10. "Mountain Man"; 11. "Folsom Prison Blues"
Current: Released: December 11, 2015	1. "Sail"; 2. "Sleepless" (original); 3. "Budapest"; 4. "Fire and Rain"; 5. "Cheerleader"; 6. "Stay With Me"; 7. "Can't Stop"; 8. "Tenerife Sea"; 9. "Wagon Wheel"; 10. "Shut Up and Dance"
Rewind: Released: December 8, 2017	1. "Blame It On Me"; 2. "Amazing Grace"; 3. "1985"; 4. "Hurt"; 5. "Walking In Memphis"; 6. "Lonesome Road"; 7. "Man In The Mirror"; 8. "Your Love"; 9. "Because"; 10. "Sinatra Medley"
Self Control: Released: May 21, 2020	1. "Icarus"; 2. "SLOW DANCING IN THE DARK"; 3. "Magnetised"; 4. "Weathered"; 5. "Love Doctor"; 6. "Happy Little Pill"
