= The Pegs =

American university a cappella group

The Harpur Harpeggios, more commonly referred to as The Pegs, is the only SSAA (soprano and alto) a cappella group at Binghamton University in Binghamton, New York.

== History and Tradition ==
The Harpur Harpeggios were founded in 1983 by a member of the Harpur Chorale. The Pegs perform a wide variety of styles of music, from 60s classics to songs on the radio today. Each semester, they host one major performance, or "Semester Show." The Pegs perform regularly at events on campus and in the Binghamton community. The Pegs also go on an annual Winter Tour, performing at schools, nursing homes, and events in the New York area.

They have competed in the International Championship of Collegiate A Cappella (ICCA) nine times, most recently in 2020. In 2005, they advanced to the Semifinals held at Yale University, at which they placed third. In 2017, the Pegs opened for the Radio City Rockettes' Christmas Spectacular. Their 2018 cover of Kelly Clarkson's "I Don't Think About You" was featured on the social media pages of Clarkson and Atlantic Records.

== Alumni Songs ==
"Boogie Woogie Bugle Boy" by The Andrews Sisters and "As Cool as I Am" by Dar Williams are currently the Pegs' alumni songs. They are sung at every semester show and often feature visiting alumni as the soloists.

== Albums ==
Sweet Dreams (1997)
More Groovy Than Candy Coated (1999)
We Don't Fake It (2001)
Too Soon for Jokes (2010)
Awk-apella (2014)
"Crazy in Love" (Single) (2016) "Vol. 37" (2020)

== See also ==
- Binghamton Crosbys
