= The New Blue of Yale =

Oldest SSAA a cappella group at Yale University

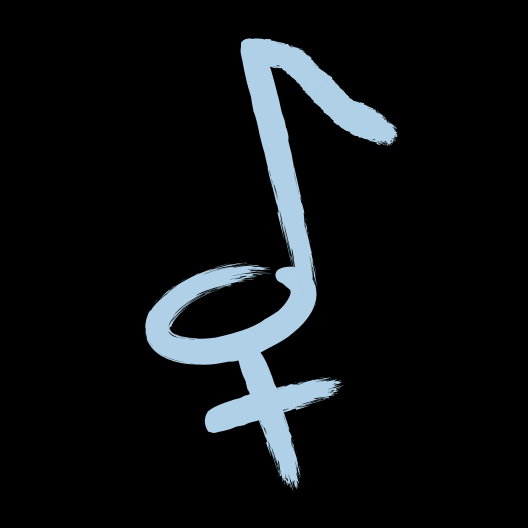
- The New Blue logo, referred to as a "bloi" note

Background information
- Origin: New Haven, Connecticut, US
- Genres: A cappella, contemporary pop, rock, indie, jazz, folk, R&B
- Years active: 1969–present (57 years)
- Members: Soprano I: Kate Kim '28; Yasmin Rodriguez '29; Amelia Tamborra-Walton '30; Soprano II: Thy Luong '28; Hazel Dye '29; Angelina Gonzalez '29; Samiha Golden '30; Alto I: Lauren Alfaro '28; Kylie Mirra '28; Leili Singer '30; Meghana Hebbar '30; Alto II: Esperance Han '28; Laira Larson '29; Lucy Martens '30; Ishika Chakraborty '30
- Website: www.newblueofyale.com

The New Blue is the oldest undergraduate women's organization and the first all-women's a cappella group at Yale University. The group was founded in 1969, and beginning in 2020, they began accepting SSAA vocalists of all genders.

A reinvention of Yale's "Old Blue", the group has released 16 albums and won multiple awards for their discography and arrangements. They have performed internationally and domestically for the likes of NASA, the United States Ambassador to France, the White House, and former Presidents George Bush, Bill Clinton, and Barack Obama. Numerous alumni of the New Blue have become notable in entertainment and other industries.

== History ==
The New Blue was formed in 1969, the year Yale College officially admitted women as undergraduate students. Existing student organizations were originally unwelcoming of the 575 newly admitted female undergraduates, and most did not immediately transition their groups to coed. The Yale Whiffenpoofs banned women outright, explaining that "it would make an inferior sound to have girls singing." As an alternative for women interested in a cappella at Yale, the Glee Club director Fenno Heath, Glee Club President Jim Weber, and Whiffenpoofs pitch(musical director) Bill Harwood held auditions for a brand new all-women’s a cappella singing group. Eleven women auditioned, a business manager and a pitch were assigned, and they were gifted a single arrangement by Fenno Heath ("East of the Sun (and West of the Moon)") to establish the group.

In their early years, the group fought against the stereotype that all-female a cappella sound was inherently deficient. 1970 marked their debut into Yale's music scene with the release of their first album, Since You Asked, a reference to the heckle of the all-male a cappella crowd that asked "the new who?" The cover features the eleven women outside Mory's Temple Bar, a male-only membership club that allowed women entry in 1974, the first of whom were members of the New Blue. A 1973 alum Joanne Wible-Kant recalled that the group "was a way for you to find your voice, get a little bit of power when you were a minority."

In January 2025, as reported by Yale's Westchester alumni association, the New Blue performed free concerts at five town libraries in Westchester County, New York, as well as the Yale Club in New York City.

== Recognition ==
Sue Kwock's arrangement of "Sweet Love," released on their 1993 album A Small Blue Thing, was awarded the 1995 Best Female Collegiate Arrangement by the Contemporary A Cappella Society.

Their 2000 album Can't Stop was named the Best Female Collegiate Album by the Contemporary A Cappella Society.

In 2018, the group was featured in College Magazine's article "The 10 Female Groups Running the A Cappella World".

== Notable alumni ==
A number of New Blue of Yale alumni have become notable individuals in education, entertainment, and other industries.

- Linda Darling-Hammond '73 – president of the California State Board of Education
- Tracey Rouault '73 – NIH senior investigator and head of its metals biology and molecular medicine branch
- Donna Dubinsky '77 – CEO of Palm, Inc., the company that developed PDAs, the predecessor to the modern smartphone
- Anne Warner '77 – represented the United States in the 1976 Summer Olympics for rowing and was inducted into the National Rowing Hall of Fame
- Polly Draper '77 – starred in the ABC drama television series Thirtysomething and was a 2009 recipient of a Writers Guild of America Award (WGA)
- Laura Maria Censabella '81 – American screenwriter and winner of Daytime Emmys in 2001 and 2002 for Outstanding Drama Writing Team in As the World Turns
- Lisa Cortés '83 – producer and director who made history as one of the first African-American women to sign her own label with a major record company; an executive producer of Precious, a six-time nominee and two-time winner at the 82nd Academy Awards
- Jessica Tuck '86 – American actress, appeared on High School Musical 2 and High School Musical 3 as Darby Evans
- Melissa Haizlip '87 – producer and Broadway stage performer whose 2018 film Mr. Soul! won the 2022 Peabody Award for Best Documentary
- Suji Kwock Kim '89 – poet and playwright whose work was a finalist for the Griffin Poetry Prize and has been published in Best American Poetry, The New York Times, The Washington Post and Los Angeles Times
- Fiona Scott Morton '89 – served as the Deputy Assistant Attorney General for Economics at the United States Department of Justice Antitrust Division from 2011 to 2012
- Catharine F. Easterly '92 – appointed by Barack Obama as an associate judge of the District of Columbia Court of Appeals
- Sara Kathryn Bakker '95 – actress, known for appearances in Law & Order, Ghost Stories, and Conviction
- Jill Kargman '95 – writer, producer, and star of American sitcom Odd Mom Out
- Kirsten Lodal '00 – cofounder of LIFT, a nonprofit dedicated to helping lift families out of poverty in the United States

== Discography ==
The New Blue has produced 16 albums and CDs. All of their music is arranged by either current or former members of the group.

| Title | Year released |
|---|---|
| Since You Asked | 1970 |
| Old, Borrowed, Blue | 1979 |
| Mood Indigo | 1982 |
| The New Blue By Popular Demand | 1986 |
| A Small Blue Thing | 1993 |
| Once in a Blue Moon | 1997 |
| Can't Stop | 1998–99 |
| Lucy | 2000–01 |
| Fire and Tenderness | 2003 |
| Since 1969 | 2005 |
| Delta Tango Romeo | 2007 |
| Blueprint | 2009 |
| Speak for Yourself | 2011 |
| Clarion Call | 2015 |
| Exit Four | 2017 |
| Still Life | 2024 |
