= Emocapella =

- Origin: Washington, DC
- Genres: Emo; Punk; A Cappella
- Years active: 2001–present

Emocapella (a portmanteau of emo and a cappella) is a collegiate a cappella group at the George Washington University, formerly all-male but co-ed since 2010. Emocapella was founded in October 2001 by Eric Denman and Dan Riesser, GW sophomores at the time, who wanted to form a group that purposefully deviated from traditional a cappella. The group's first performance was in December 2001, opening for another GW a cappella group, the Vibes. They were invited by Taking Back Sunday in December 2002 to perform at their opening act.

Emocapella's shows include rock jumps and comedy, and it credits itself with giving the name "Guerillacapella" to doing performances in random spots on campus.

== Press ==
Emocapella has been featured in several major publications including Entertainment Weekly, Maxim Blender Magazine, and Spin magazine as well as MTV.com, and has received international mention from such sources as the British Music Magazine Kerrang!, a Japanese Radio Interview, and the German Publication Visions.

"Guerillacapella" refers to a cappella singing focusing on impromptu concerts, "spur-of-the-moment" shows on the George Washington University's campus, described by Emocapella's president Lee Seligmann in this words: "Sometimes people stop and watch. But it usually depends on when we perform and how drunk people are.". The performance style is named after guerrilla warfare.

== Albums ==
Emocapella has released two albums to date, I'm Sorry (2003) and Is It In Yet? (2006).

=== I'm Sorry ===
I'm Sorry, Emocapella's debut album, was released in 2003. It is a studio album and has 11 songs: 10 covers and one original.

1. Enjoy Your Day (Alkaline Trio)
2. Cute Without the 'E' (Taking Back Sunday)
3. Even Hitler Had A Girlfriend (The Mr. T Experience)
4. Soco Amaretto Lime (Brand New)
5. Nebutol (Manatee)
6. Fuck Her Gently (Tenacious D)
7. Aside (The Weakerthans)
8. At Your Funeral (Saves the Day)
9. Just a Friend (Biz Markie)
10. Where Have You Been? (Reel Big Fish)
11. Canon In DD (Emocapella Original, parody of Canon in D major by Johann Pachelbel)

=== Is It In Yet? ===
Emocapella's second album, also a studio album, was released in 2006. Titled Is It In Yet? it features 10 songs, all covers.

1. Lonely Day (Phantom Planet)
2. The Artist in the Ambulance (Thrice)
3. On Legendary (Further Seems Forever)
4. Waggy (Blink-182)
5. I'm Not Okay (I Promise) (My Chemical Romance)
6. Go or Go Ahead (Rufus Wainwright)
7. Song for the Dumped (Ben Folds and Adam Sandler)
8. Next to You (Matt Skiba)
9. She Gotta Smile (Stephen Lynch)
10. My Girlfriend's Dead (The Vandals)
