= Simmons Sirens =

The Simmons Sirens are the official a cappella group of Simmons University in Boston. The Sirens participate in competitions and performances around the Boston area.

Simmons Sirens was formed in 1989 when a group of six Simmons students left the school choral group Persimmons with the goal of creating their own, student-run a cappella group. They chose the name with the mysterious creatures of mythology in mind. Though no Simmons a cappella groups had lasted before, they founded Sirens with the goal of beginning a long-standing tradition.

The first Sirens concert was held on November 9, 1989 with special guests Tufts Beelzebubs. In their first semester on campus the Sirens were a smashing success, singing at school events in addition to hosting their first concert. The Sirens have continued to hold a semesterly concert to the present day.

The Sirens recorded their first album, Take '92, in 1992 at Syncro Sound recording studio. Though the group initially tried to record with Bristol studios, unprofessional treatment caused them to relocate. The Sirens went on to release several full-length CDs, to include Enchanting You, Hypnotic, Jidda Lidda What?, and How Awkward.

In September 2018, The Sirens released their first digital single "Take Me Home", a cover of singer Jess Glynne's 2015 song of the same title. Though the Sirens typically rotate their repertoire of songs every semester, "Take Me Home" stayed, and became a Sirens staple. It is currently the only song with permanent residence in their lineup.

Sirens is open to all students attending a school under the Colleges of the Fenway, a consortium of colleges which Simmons University is a part of. The Sirens' current lineup consists of 17 members from all 5 member schools.

The Sirens host several concerts a semester where they invite other college groups from around Boston. They also have appeared as a guest group for other a cappella groups all over the region.

== Discography ==
=== Albums ===
- Take '92 (1992)
- Enchanting You (1998)
- The Urban Cowgirl (1999)
- Hypnotic (2002)
- Jidda Lidda What? (2005)
- How Awkward

=== EPs ===
- Brookline Ave (2020)
- Unusual Suspects (2024)

=== Singles ===
- Take Me Home (2018)
- Falling Water (2021)
