= Wellesley College Tupelos =

American college a capella music group

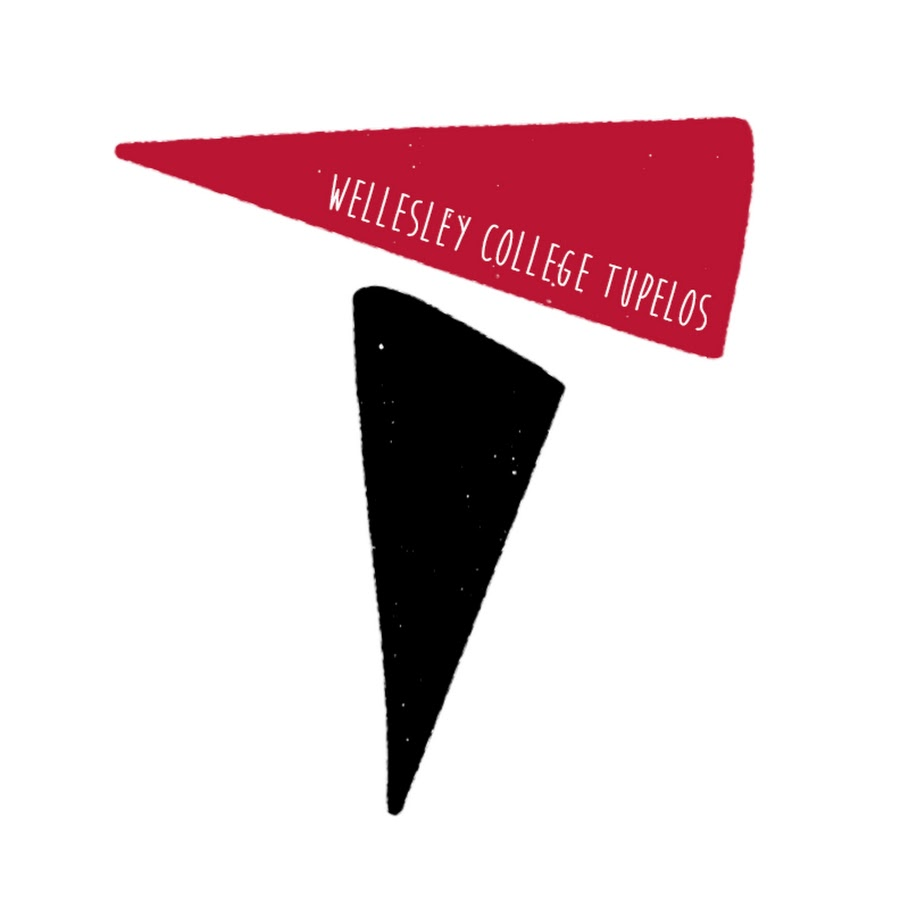
- Official logo of the Tupelos

Background information
- Origin: Wellesley College
- Genres: A cappella
- Years active: 1947–present

The Wellesley College Tupelos are one of the oldest a cappella groups at Wellesley College. Founded in 1947, the group has performed throughout the Eastern United States. Their name allegedly came from Tupelo Point on Lake Waban on the college campus, the same place where Hillary Rodham Clinton '69 took her now-well-known yearbook photos.

The Tupelos repertoire includes pop music, jazz, throwbacks, and traditional Wellesley songs. They have hosted guest groups at their performances and competed at the collegiate level.

The Tupelos are known for their "Sunday Candy" mashup performance. They have been featured on Acaville Radio.
