= The Spokes =

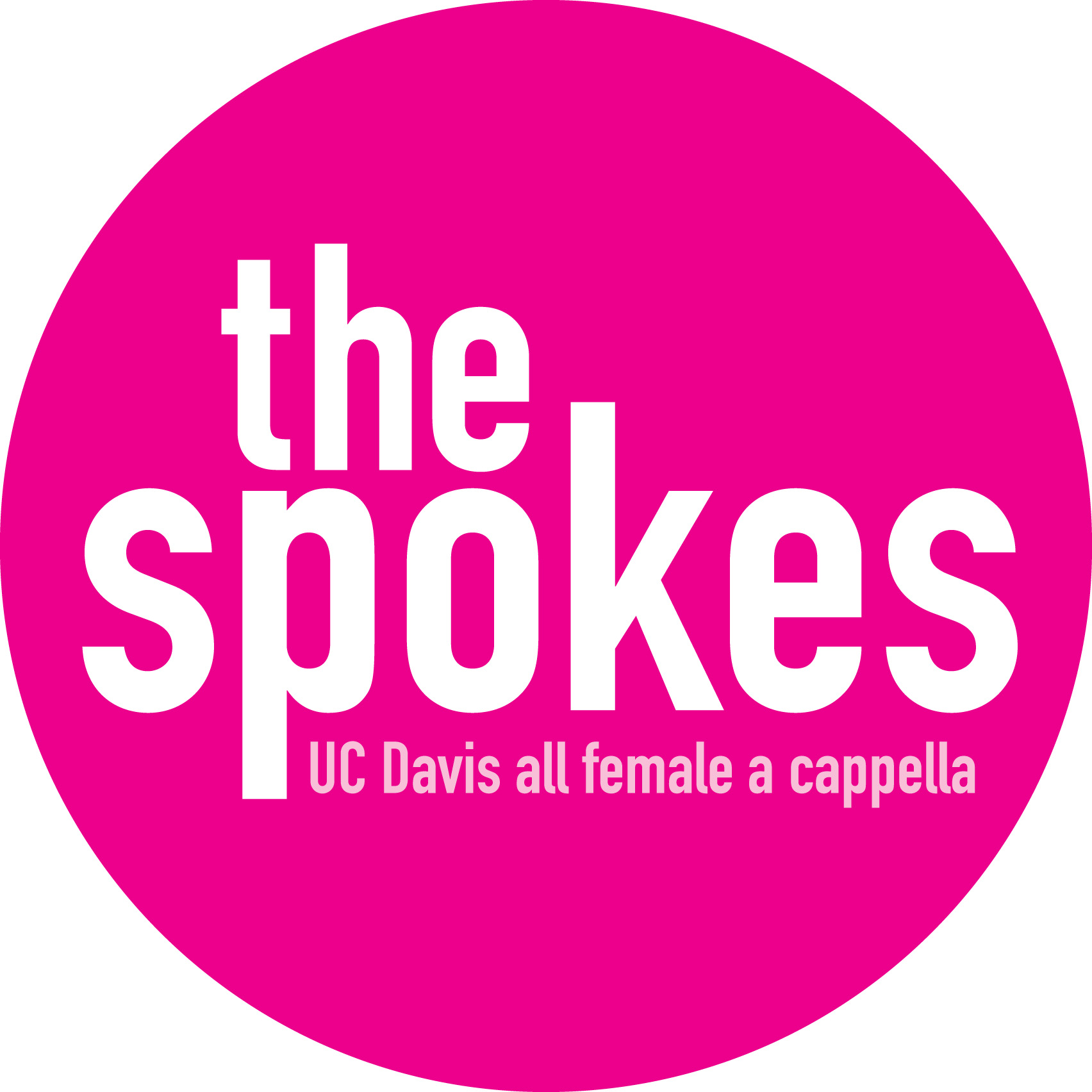

Background information
- Origin: Davis, California
- Genre: A cappella
- Years active: 2004 – present
- Members: Luwam Naizghi; Anousha Sannat; Dayci Dishny; Ashley Fenical; Alexandra Demaris; Janevah Dorestin; Kendelle Lannert; Andie Ngo; Grace Gunasekara; Gina Reinsberg; Adrienne Lucero

The Spokes are a high-voice collegiate a cappella group at the University of California, Davis. They have performed at various a cappella shows, the International Championship of Collegiate A Cappella, and their annual a cappella showcase, HellaCappella at the Mondavi Center for the Performing Arts.

The Spokes have won several awards at ICCA over the years, including Best Choreography in 2011, Best Beatboxing in 2016, 2nd Place at the Northwest Quarterfinals in 2016, Best Choreography in 2018, and 3rd place at the West Quarterfinals in 2022, and Outstanding Soloist in 2022, 2nd place at West Quarterfinals in 2024 (advanced to Semifinals), and Outstanding Arrangement in 2024.

The Spokes also work to capture their sound through their recorded albums and EPs each year, which can be heard on Apple and Spotify Music.

== History ==
The Spokes were created in January 2004 by two former members of the coed a cappella group, the Liquid Hotplates. Co-founders, Jaclyn Cohen and the Grammy nominated country artist, Cam (singer) Ochs, posted fliers around UC Davis to find entertaining and talented students who were interested in forming an all-female group. After several rounds of auditions, there were eight Spokes. They practiced in the music room of the Infill dorms at Davis and in members' apartments.

== Performances and Appearances ==
The Spokes have toured cities in California including Berkeley for the annual West Coast A Cappella showcase hosted by the California Golden Overtones and UC Men's Octet, Los Angeles for the annual California A Cappella Festival hosted by Random Voices, and Claremont for the annual SCAMFest hosted by the Claremont Shades. They also host their own annual shows including "HellaCappella: The West Coast premier A Cappella Showcase", and "LocalTones: An All-Davis, All-A Cappella Concert". In addition, the group goes on a musical and bonding retreat every Winter as well as attending a cappella festivals like SheSings by the Women's A Cappella Association and LAAF.

The Spokes have also been featured on Good Day Sacramento and KXJZ's Capital Public Radio. The Spokes have performed at the California Firefighter's Memorial Ceremony in Sacramento, Davis Idol at Davis Senior High School, the Annual Tree Lighting Ceremony at the State Capitol, and the Fab 40s in Sacramento.

The group prides itself on its commitment to philanthropy and in the past has donated a portion of their profits to local charities including Daraja Academy and the Women's Empowerment Center in Sacramento, CA.

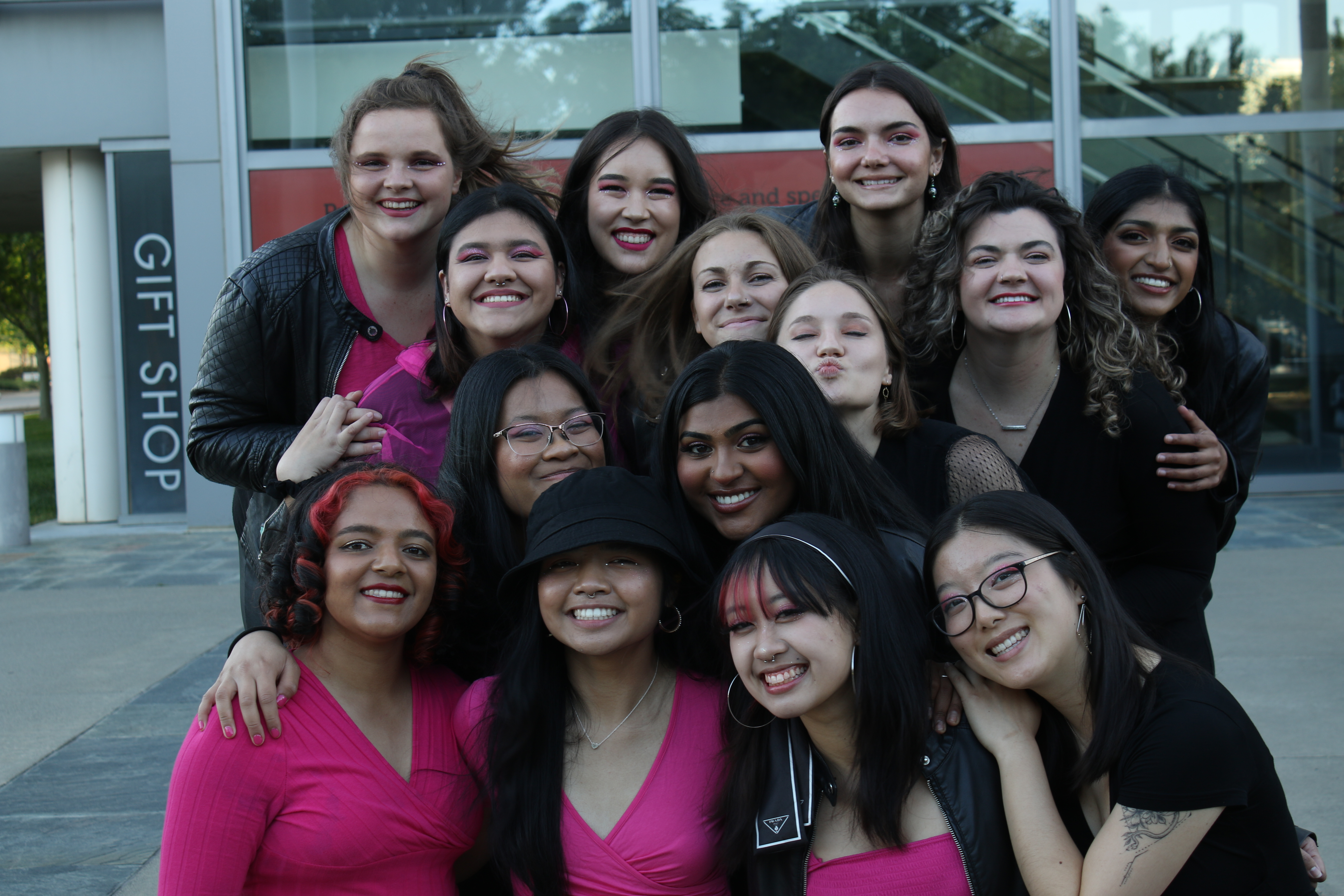
HellaCappella 2022

== Albums and EPs ==
=== Guiltless (2021) ===
1. All I Got/Havana (Sean Kingston and Camila Cabello)
2. Pray You Catch Me (Beyoncé)
3. Cool Girl/Guiltless (Dodie)
4. Good Thing (Zedd feat. Kehlani)

=== HellaCappella (2020) ===
1. Sweet Little Unforgettable Thing (Bea Miller)
2. Fate (H.E.R.)
3. Norman hecking Rockwell (Lana Del Ray)
4. Lost in My Boots
5. Cinderella (Play)
6. God is a Woman/***Flawless (Ariana Grande and Beyoncé)

=== Pynk (2020) ===
1. Pynk (Janelle Monáe feat. Grimes)
2. Technicolor Beat (Oh Wonder)
3. Don't Stop Me Now (Queen)
4. Fall in Line (Christina Aguilera)

=== Goldmine (2019) ===
1. Invincible (Big Wild)
2. Gone (Lianne La Havas)
3. Greedy (Ariana Grande)
4. Blow Your Mind/New Rules (Dua Lipa)
5. Hurt (Christina Aguilera)
6. Bass Song (Eryn Allen Kane)

=== All I Need (2018) ===
1. Radar (AudioDamn!)
2. Say (All I Need) (OneRepublic)
3. I Will Survive (Gloria Gaynor)
4. Move Like U Stole It (ZZ Ward)

=== SIN (2017) ===
1. I Feel a Sin Comin' On (Pistol Annies)
2. Focus (Ariana Grande)
3. Here (Alessia Cara)
4. Diva (Beyonce)

=== 23 Hours (2016) ===
1. Car Wash
2. Ghost
3. Like a Boy/Do It Like a Dude
4. One Time
5. Nobody Love
6. Ain't No Rest for the Wicked
7. Boogie Wonderland/Let's Groove/September/Sing a Song
8. See You Again

=== Shades of Pink: Volume II (2015) ===
1. 99 Problems
2. Say My Name/Toxic
3. Figure 8
4. Awake Me Up
5. C'mon Talk
6. Fleetwood Mac Medley
7. Bones
8. Man's World
9. Unwritten

=== Shades of Pink: Volume I (2014) ===
1. Wings
2. More
3. Sweet Caroline
4. Never Ever Getting Back Together/Gives You Hell
5. Us Against the World
6. Wonder
7. I Need Your Love

=== KaleidoSpoke (2014) ===
1. She Wolf
2. Hit Me With Your Best Shot/Just What I Need
3. I'll Be Waiting
4. Happy Ending
5. Fighter
6. Smile
7. | 2 |
8. That Thing You Doo Wop
9. Say A Little Prayer

=== On The Wall (2011) ===
1. Breathless
2. ABBA Medley
3. Ridin' Solo
4. Top of the World
5. Heartbreaker
6. King of Anything
7. Seven Nation Army
8. She Will Be Loved

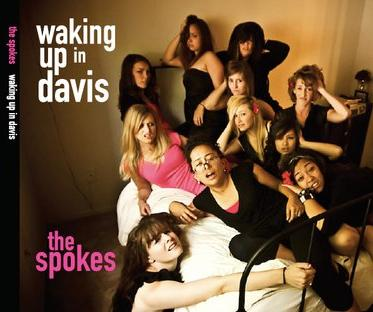
"Waking Up in Davis" Album

=== Waking Up in Davis (2010) ===
1. Maybe (Ingrid Michaelson)
2. Disturbia (Rihanna)
3. Signed, Sealed, Delivered I'm Yours/Super Duper Love (Stevie Wonder)/(Joss Stone)
4. My Moon My Man (Feist)
5. Waking Up in Davis (remake of Katy Perry's Waking Up in Vegas)
6. Street Spirit (Radiohead)
7. Nothing Ever Hurt Like You (James Morrison)
8. And So It Goes (Billy Joel)
9. Let Your Love Flow (Petra Haden)
10. Annie Waits (Ben Folds)
11. Hands (Jewel)
12. Alone (Heart)

=== The Pink Album (2008) ===
1. I Need a Hero
2. Street Spirit
3. You Don't Own Me
4. I'm Yours
5. Annie Waits
6. Spokehemian Rhapsody
7. Cellotape
8. Not Myself
9. It's Raining Men
10. Sweet Escape

=== This Means Go (2006) ===
1. Hazel Eyes/Sugar, We're Going Down
2. In Your Eyes
3. My Love
4. Have A Little Faith In Me
5. It's Raining Men
6. Fix You
7. Bohemian Rhapsody/Golden Slumbers
8. Another White Dash
9. Don't Turn Around
10. I Can See Clearly
11. Gold Digger

=== Just Ride It (2004) ===
1. Fever
2. All this Time
3. Ring My Bell
4. Fools Fall in Love
5. Either Way
6. Kiss da Girl
7. Bohemian Rhapsody/Golden Slumbers
8. Love me Tomorrow

== Awards ==
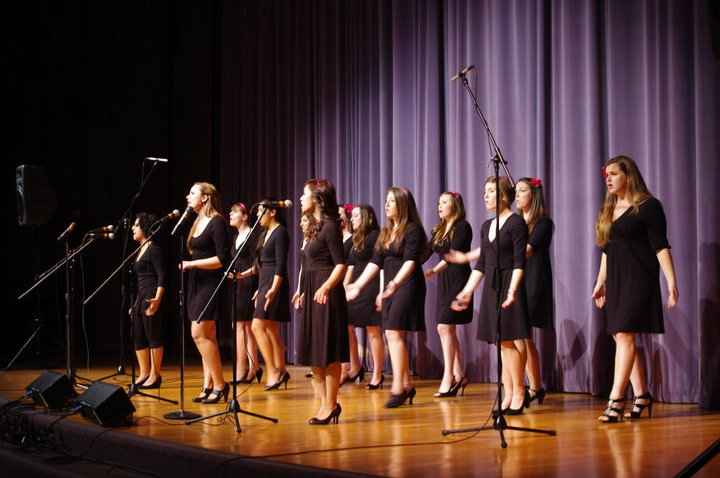
ICCA 2011

- ICCA West Quarterfinals (2011) Best Choreography: Kacie Contreras on Top of the World
- ICCA West Quarterfinals (2016) Best Beatboxing: Anya Stewart on One Time (Marian Hill)
- ICCA West Quarterfinals (2016) 2nd Place
- ICCA West Quarterfinals (2018) Best Choreography: Amanda Beardsley on the entire set Bass Song (Eryn Allen Kane), Hurt (Christina Aguilera), and Greedy (Ariana Grande)
- ICCA West Quarterfinals (2022) 3rd Place
- ICCA West Quarterfinals (2022) Outstanding Soloist: Lyrissa Leininger for Dancing with the Devil
- ICCA West Quarterfinals (2024)

== Spokes Alumna ==
- Lyrissa Leininger (2021-2022)
- Bonnie Guo (2020-2022)
- Kelsey Crist (2019-2022)
- Emily Htway (2019-2022)
- Makenna Stever (2018-2022)
- Shayanti Goshal (2020-2021)
- Claire Benoist (2020-2021)
- Peleiah Baesa (2019-2021)
- Jennifer Wang (2018-2020)
- Monica Yuo (2018-2020)
- Ashley Tseng (2018-2020)
- Sowbarnika Kanna (2017-2020)
- Mathilda Silverstein (2017-2020)
- Brooke Talkington (2017-2020)
- Gwen Little (2017-2020)
- Sarah Kadlec (2017-2020)
- Nikki Vallone (2018-2019)
- Tanya Kameswaran (2017-2019)
- Nelofer Siddiqui (2017-2019)
- Amanda Beardsley (2014-2018)
- Taylor Muldrow (2014-2018)
- Tatiana Boyle (2014-2018)
- Kassandra Jensen (2014-2018)
- Molly Huff (2014-2018)
- Anusha Suresh (2015-2018)
- Elizabeth Hall (2015-2018)
- De-Vonne Sonuga (2016-2018)
- Emily Laskin (2013-2017)
- Mary Grafilo (2014-2017)
- Crystal Lucio (2016-2017)
- Anya Stewart (2013-2016)
- Alyssa Gire (2013-2016)
- Tanya Rodman (2013-2016)
- Miranda Stever (2011-2016)
- Lynsie Mason (2012-2016)
- Sara Ellis (2011-2014)
- Rachel Riley (2011-2014)
- Megan Wiley (2010-2014)
- Rachel Forer (2010-2014)
- Caitlin Sanhamel(2009-2011)
- Camille Martinez (2008-2013)
- Kayla Ruben (2010-2013)
- Emily Korwin (2010-2013)
- Mercy Albaran (2007-2011)
- Kacie Conover (2009-2011)
- Greer Shivley (2007-2011)
- Julie Athans (2008-2012)
- Kirsten Vincent (2011-2013)
- Emily Randall (2009-2012)
- Katie Darfler (2008-2010)
- Jennifer Pugh (2007-2010)
- Sara Scheller (2007-2010)
- Meredith Laird (2007-2009)
- Claire Krohmer (2006-2009)
- Katie Bowen (2006-2009)
- Amelia Hassani (2006-2009)
- Emily Peña (2006-2009)
- Lena Schiffer(2007-2009)
- Shauna Payyappilli(2007-2008)
- Paris Perrault (2005-2008)
- Andrea Pasiliao (2005-)
- Alexi Elconi (2005-)
- Annie Pestolesi (2005-)
- Emily Sklar (2005-)
- Kate Brody Adams (2003-2005)
- Jordan Steiner (2004-)
- A.Tianna Scozzaro (Founder)
- Alicia Flor (Founder)
- Andrea Howard (Founder)
- Allie Pedrazzi (Founder)
- Katrina Hoo-Soo (Founder)
- Elana Zizmor (Founder)
- Jaclyn Fromer (Founder)
- Katrina Hoo-Soo (Founder)
- Camaron Ochs (Founder)
