= CU Buffoons =

Collegiate A Cappella Group

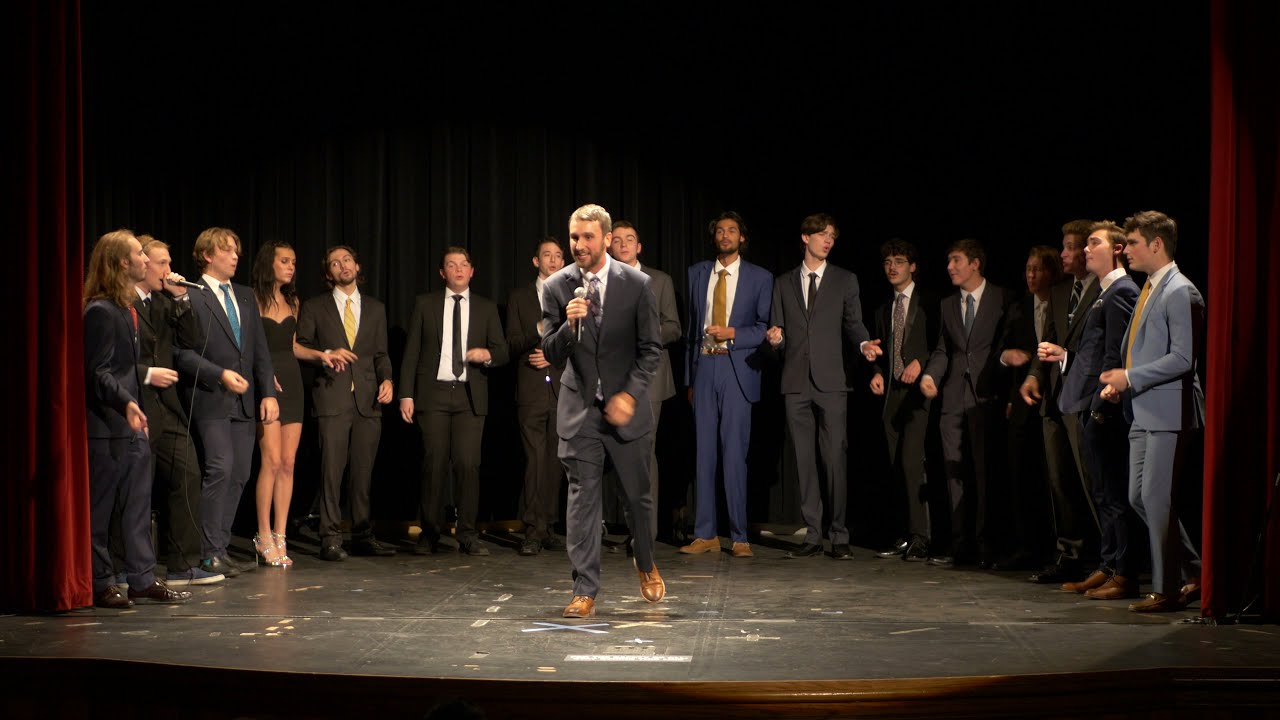
- The Buffoons perform at their fall 2021 concert

Background information
- Also known as: The Buffoons, Foons
- Origin: Boulder, Colorado
- Genre: Collegiate A Cappella
- Years active: 1962–present
- Label: Tribute Records
- Members: Gunnar Neufeld Luke McCord Zane Zakroff Jayce Klein Siva Sundaresh Noah Osteroos Gunnar Chapman Roy Zuniga Tony Adams Younes Aichiouene Isaac Moore Ibrahim Souare Noah Sambirsky Kobe Schindler
- Website: cubuffoons.org

The CU Buffoons (sometimes stylized as BUFFoons) is the oldest collegiate a cappella group at the University of Colorado-Boulder, founded in 1962 by Dr. Oakleigh Thorne II with help from Don Grusin and Roger Nelson. The group has consisted of anywhere from 8-20 undergraduate and graduate students throughout its over 60-year history, with new members being auditioned at the start of every fall semester. With arranging being done in house by current and former group members, their repertoire consists of covers of pieces from a wide variety of musical genres, including jazz, rock, RnB, pop, show tunes, and more, and is constantly updated with new arrangements of more recent songs.

The group has been recognized over the years in differing ways, having the privilege of serving as Colorado Music Ambassadors in their early years, and most recently being featured on both the Voices Only and Best of College A Cappella compilation albums in 2012 and 2013 respectively for their cover of Down the Line's 2010 song "The Great Debate". The group was also featured on the 2009 album Ben Folds Presents: University A Cappella!, produced by Folds, performing a cover of his song "Landed". The group performs across the Colorado Front Range, occasionally traveling out of the state to tour or collaborate with other collegiate groups.

The group is seen as one of the earliest collegiate a cappella groups in the western United States, with the Golden Overtones of the University of California-Berkeley and the Mendicants of Stanford University being the only other still existing groups from a college west of the Mississippi to claim a founding before 1965. It has since inspired the growth of the a cappella community at CU-Boulder, which now boasts 7 a cappella groups.

== History ==
=== 1950s-1962: Oak and the Founders ===
In June 1954, Dr. Oakleigh "Oak” Thorne II (the previous musical director, or "pitchpipe", of the Yale Whiffenpoofs) moved to Boulder to receive his doctorate in biology at the University of Colorado. The Whiffenpoofs, founded in 1909, are the oldest a Cappella group in the nation. In 1961, after a performance in Denver for the Yale Association, Thorne brought the Whiffenpoofs to Macky Auditorium on CU's campus to sing. When Thorne introduced the group he suggested that someone should start an a Cappella group on CU's campus as well. When asked later why he pushed the student body to take up the style and create a group, Thorne stated, ""I thought the sounds of a cappella without any instruments was such a great sound. I just wanted to see it established out here in the West."

A year later, the Whiffenpoofs were brought back to Boulder by Thorne, and again he challenged the audience to start their own collegiate group. Shortly after the concert, Don Grusin and Roger Nelson, two CU undergraduates, approached Oak to ask if he could help them start such a group. Delighted, Oak provided guidance and arrangements for the singers. By September 1962, the three musicians had formed an octet under the name "The BUFFoons," a reference to the university mascot, Ralphie the Buffalo. The name was eventually re-stylized to simply “Buffoons”, dropping the capitalization.

=== 1963-1978: First Albums and Golden Years ===
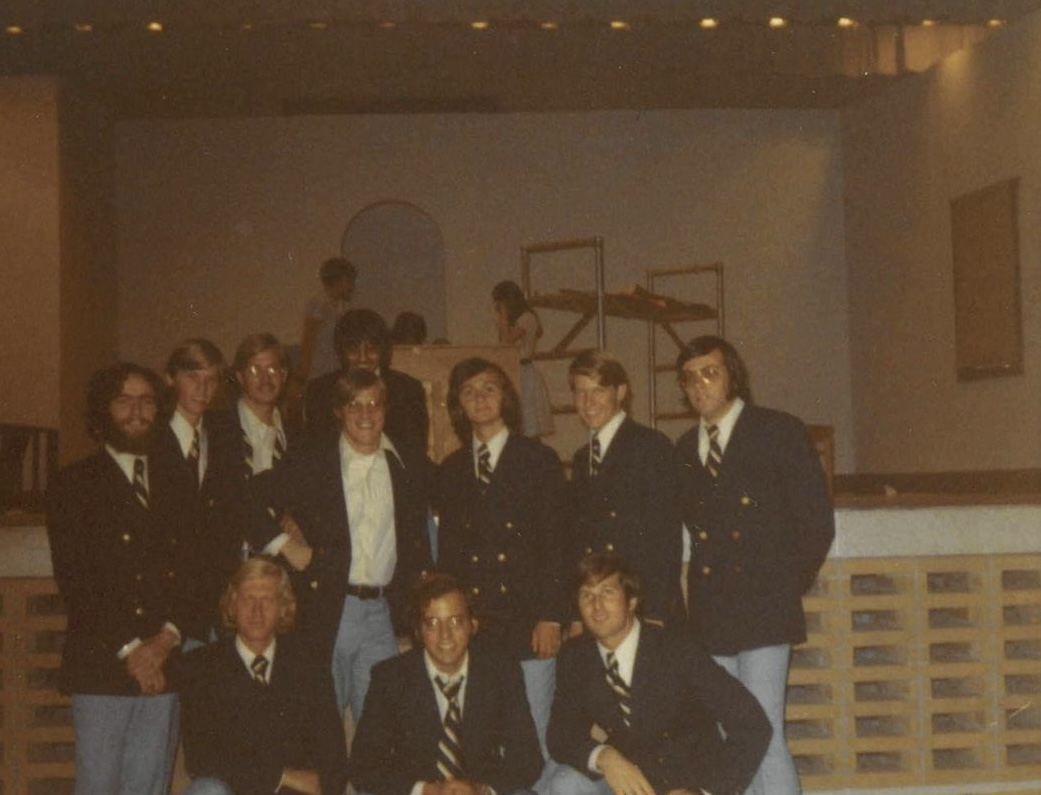
The CU Buffoons at a performance in 1971

In 1963, the group released their first album, titled Songs by the C.U. BUFFoons, enjoying a bit of initial success due to being somewhat of a novelty for Colorado. Consisting of 11 covers of show tunes, barbershop standards, and popular songs of the day, the project was fairly rudimentary, but impressive for the time. Enjoying the perks of their newfound local fame, the group decided to continue to record and release covers of their favorite songs. Thus began a 15-year period with the group releasing an album roughly every 2 1/2 years. The group's follow-up, Quit’cha, was released just 2 years after their initial offering. Wanting to outdo themselves, this album came in at 20 songs and roughly double the run time of their previous effort. The title track, a re-recording of one of their most popular songs to appear on the 1963 album, has since been phased out due to misogynistic lyrics and messaging, as pointed out in an op-ed written about the Bowdoin College Meddiebempsters, another a cappella group which also sang the song as a tradition until recently. This trend of re-recording their most successful songs as the title track for their following album continued with 1967's For You. The group decided on a happy medium of 13 songs this time around, with overall quality being lost a bit due to the sheer quantity of music they had released in 1965. It is also the first instance of a recording of a song that survives in the group's modern day repertoire, with "Cecilia" being later re-recorded on 2010's Bell Time, as well as being a concert and private performance staple.

From 1967 to 1977, the group continued to develop their sound and release more albums, including 1969's Those Magnificent Men, 1972's Hangin’ On, and 1976's Colorado Trail. In 1978, the group released their first live album. Although technically their studio recording process in these early years could be considered live recording, with all singers gathering around one or two microphones to sing through a full song, Live at Tulagi was recorded in front of a live concert audience at Boulder's famous Tulagi Bar. This is considered the high point of this era, as Tulagi was also booking acts such as The Eagles, The Doobie Brothers, Linda Ronstadt, Bonnie Raitt, ZZ Top and even Miles Davis during the late 70's. Unknowingly though, this would be the group's last album before their longest hiatus from releasing albums to date.

=== 1979-1994: Hiatuses and Bingo Time With Carlos ===
Without much reason, the group decided to step back from their regular album cycle for almost a decade in the late 1970s and early 1980s. Whether it was a dip in membership or a general lack of enthusiasm for recording new music, the next Buffoons album would not come for some time. This did not mean a break from performance though. On the contrary, during this time a cappella continued to see growth across the US and world at large, gaining a wider audience and seeing increased opportunities for acts wishing to share their voices. During this time, the group managed to perform at a wide variety of events across Colorado and the Rocky Mountain region, including on a few occasions for the Governor of Colorado and other various people and at large scale events, such as University of Colorado sporting events. The a cappella community at CU also grew during this time, seeing other groups form and break up. Though some stuck around for a few years, most couldn't consistently bring in enough new members to sustain continued growth.

By the mid-1980s, the group began to get an itch to record new music. In 1987, coinciding with the 25th anniversary of the founding of the Buffoons, the group released their first album in over 9 years, Bingo Time with Carlos. This album was released on CD in a very limited fashion, leading to it eventually being almost lost to time. With no mention of it online, and no physical copies seemingly available anywhere, it was only with the discovery of a single CD copy in the late 2010s that this album was finally brought back to life. After underperforming sales of the album, the group once again decided to focus their time on touring Colorado and performing at private events. It would be another long wait for new music from the Buffoons. During this second hiatus, the group began a new tradition. Despite having experienced a fairly successful first quarter century of existence, the group was very much still just a club on campus at CU-Boulder. Watching old members leave every spring and new ones arrive every fall, one member, Jojo David, decided to write a song for the group. What he produced was called "Tribute". With David’s passing in the mid 1990’s, the song has become a cornerstone of the Buffoon experience, sung after every rehearsal and public performance. It details the harsh reality that all Buffoons will come and go, but the memories and music shared by the generations of Buffoons past and future binds all of them together. It has also appeared on every album released since 1995 in honor of David and all alumni, living and deceased.

=== 1995-2009: Modern Era and "Landed" ===
In the mid 1990s, the group decided that the time was right to make their return to the album cycle, beginning with Happy Hour in 1995. This project was defined by the new sound the Buffoons would establish for themselves over the following few years. Still recorded live in studio, as all Buffoons studio albums had been produced to this point, in terms of arrangements, this album featured songs that would persist in the group’s consistent repertoire for many years, including "Seven Bridges Road," "Drift Away," and "Runaround Sue." Their next few outings, Fine Malt A’capella, No Time for Love, and So They Say, all continued to build on the foundation of the previous, with the lattermost beginning to showcase a new facet of their sound, vocal percussion. While not a defined role within the group until recently, vocal percussion is a staple of most Buffoon covers arranged from 2000 onward, mirroring an already growing trend in professional a cappella.

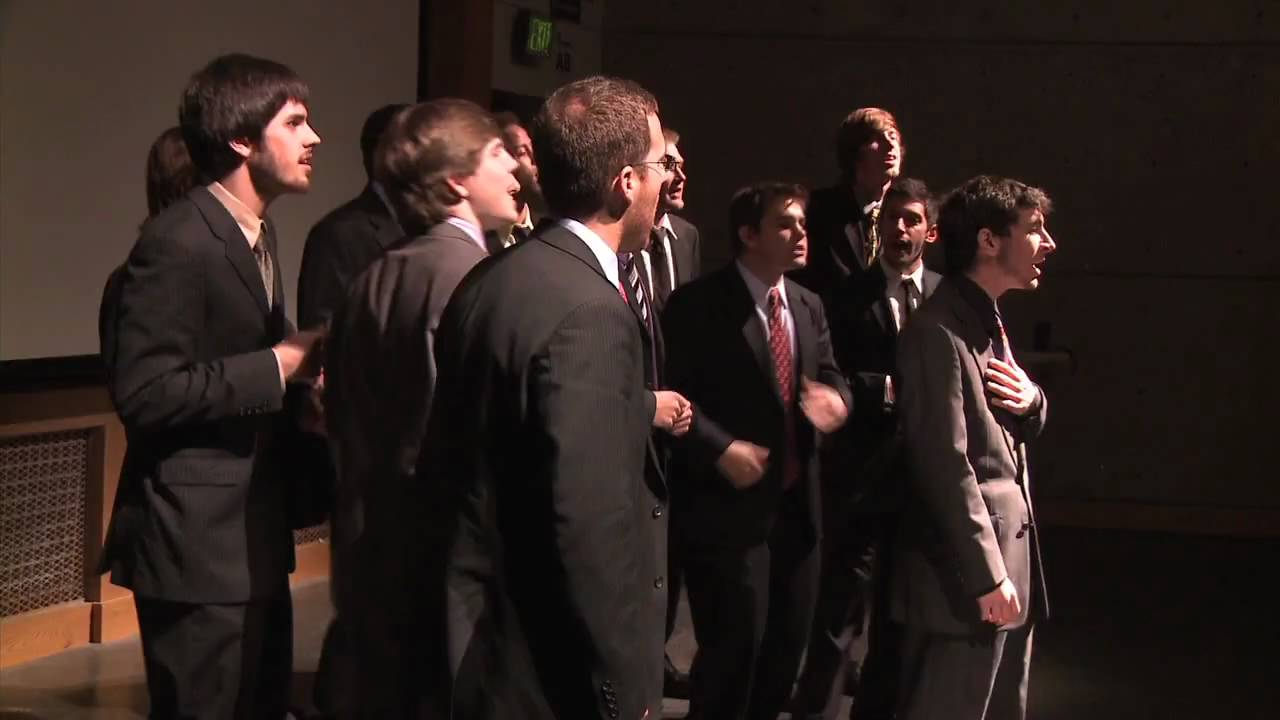
The CU Buffoons perform “Landed” off A Night at the Zoo in 2009

In 2007, the group released A Night at the Zoo, which featured an arrangement of the song "Landed", originally written and performed by Ben Folds. With the rising popularity of a cappella worldwide during the mid to late 2000’s due to shows like Glee and The Sing-Off taking off, as well as groups like Pentatonix and Straight No Chaser finding stardom with viral videos, Folds was inspired by a video of a rendition of another one of his songs by Ohio University group The Leading Tones to put together an entire album of a cappella arrangements of his songs, performed by collegiate groups from across the country. The Buffoons were lucky enough to be chosen to sing a slightly altered version of their rendition of Landed. Ben Folds Presents: University A Cappella! was released in 2009 to fairly positive reviews, AllMusic giving it 3 stars and the A.V. Club giving it a B−, with Muriel Vega of Paste.com writing that "The University of Colorado’s Buffoons lose some of their identity in “Landed,” sounding eerily like Folds himself at times," and giving the project an overall score of 9.1/10. Though this was certainly the group's greatest achievement in its almost 50 year history at the time, it still wouldn't be long before they reached even greater heights.

=== 2010-2019: “The Great Debate” and Christmas Love ===
In 2010, on the back of their heightened profile following the success of “Landed,” the group released Bell Time, 14 songs in length, including the group’s first venture into live concert recording since Live at Tulagi with “Drift Away (Live)." After this, there was call within the group for a big swing, something that could elevate the group to national recognition. The answer to this was “The Great Debate,” a song by little known folk rock group Down the Line. The almost 4 and a half minute arrangement was the lead single for the group’s 2012 album Under the Arches, which gets its title from the tradition of performing at the University Memorial Center fountains plaza under a covered walkway adorned with arches after group rehearsals. This album was produced with the express purpose of being submitted for consideration by year-end best of collegiate a cappella compilations Voices Only and Varsity Vocals’ BOCA. “The Great Debate” appeared on Voices Only 2012 Vol. 2 and BOCA 2013, along with many other nationally renowned collegiate a cappella groups. It has become the Buffoons most popular song of all time, amassing over 50,000 streams across all platforms as of 2023.

In 2015 the group went on to release Songs from the Grove to moderate success. Not chosen for any compilations this time, it still greatly developed the group’s sound. With their profile on the decline following “The Great Debate” and a lack of equal follow-up, the group decided to once again switch gears and create something new. With the idea for a Christmas album having been floated several times in the previous years, and new music being much more sparse since their last release, the group decided to trot out their collection of holiday arrangements for a seasonal album. Recorded in closets with a much smaller budget than recent projects, Christmas Love still managed to be a solid outing for the group. The album's title track was written and arranged by Dr. Oakleigh Thorne II, who had been involved with the group on-and-off almost since his earliest days as an alum, with Thorne also providing vocals. The group couldn't have known that just 5 days after the release of their latest album, as they performed their annual holiday concert, first reports of a group of Chinese citizens with a potential new illness became public.

=== 2020-Present: Lockdown and Carved From Oak ===
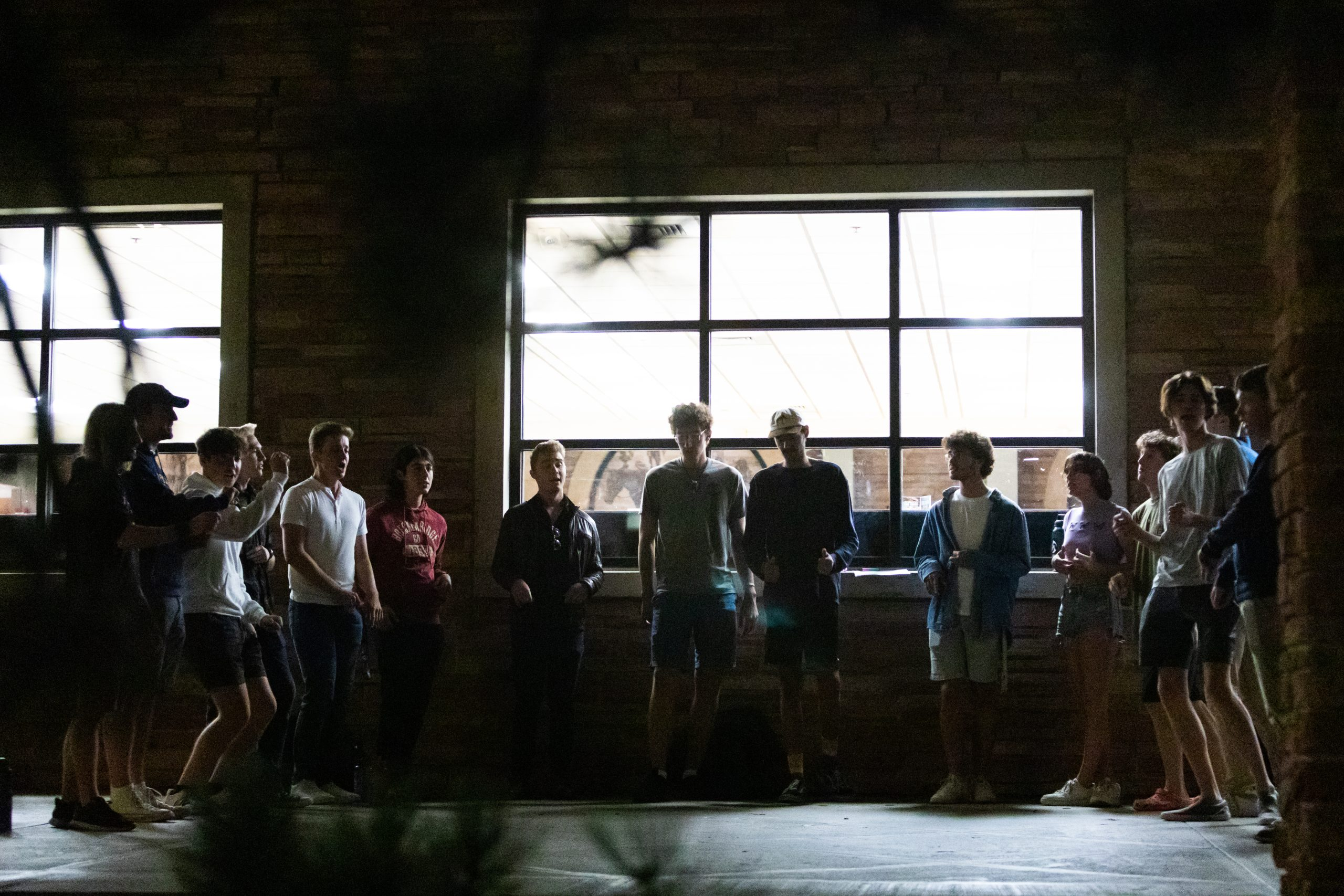
The CU Buffoons perform at the UMC Arches in 2022

With the COVID-19 pandemic beginning in early 2020, the Buffoons were unable to meet as a group for almost 12 months as lockdowns and gathering restrictions limited the groups ability to not only perform and make money, but to foster the relationships which the entire group was built on. Zoom meetings were essential to maintaining some form of continuity, but with restrictions continuing to be an issue in moving forward and even just getting back to normal operations, it was increasingly difficult to keep the group together. Remote auditions by video allowed new members to be recruited, though chemistry floundered due to a lack of interaction between older and newer members. Despite the setbacks, the group still found ways to keep reinventing themselves. Although they were self-labeled as an “all-male” group for the majority of their existence, 2020 the group re-branded to be more inclusive, now identifying as a “tenor/bass” group, and opened up the audition process to anyone in that particular vocal range, welcoming their first female member in 2021. Also in 2021, due to vocal percussion becoming such a large part of the group's sound, a full-time beat boxer was added to the group's regular line-up.

In 2022, the group celebrated 60 years, and with Oak Thorne celebrating his 95th birthday in 2023, the time felt right to return to music recording once again. With a large selection of new arrangements, the group took a more detail oriented approach to the album production process, aiming to create a more full experience. They collaborated with several industry titans, such as Corey Slutsky of Voices Only Productions, and contemporary a cappella pioneer and Grammy award-winning producer, Bill Hare, to finally arrive at a polished product, the aptly named Carved From Oak. Two singles were released in the month prior to the album's release in early May 2023, "Put Your Records On" and "The Anthem of Mr. Dark.” 10 tracks in length, Carved From Oak immediately landed in the top 5 most popular Buffoons albums of all time, bringing in roughly 40,000 streams in the first 6 months across all platforms. 5 more bonus tracks, live re-recordings of previously released Buffoons covers, were released as an EP in late October 2023.

== Musical Style and Influences ==
Since 1962, the groups repertoire has expanded to include covers of songs from nearly every imaginable genre of music. Beginning with a set of jazz standards and old folk tunes, the group quickly found that as time passed, not only were the songs getting old after continuous rehearsal and performance, but they were entering a new age of sound. Rock was now the popular music of the time, and with it came more arrangements in that genre. Moving on to RnB, alternative, country, and modern pop, the group now boasts over 100 unique arrangements, of which about 25-30 are in consistent rotation for performances.

The group arranges songs for Tenor/Baritone/Bass vocal ranges, which initially meant that they only fielded male voices for new members. Vocal percussion became an important piece of the regular Buffoons sound in the mid-2000s, mirroring the same trend seen everywhere in collegiate a cappella. The group cites many sources as influence, obviously including the acts that they cover. The list also includes other collegiate a cappella acts, such as the Yale Whiffenpoofs, the Doox of Yale, the Tufts Beelzebubs, the Princeton Katzenjammers, and the Midnight Ramblers of Rochester University, among others. The group also enjoys collaborating with other musical acts, including CU's annual Acapalooza event which brings together all 7 of the CU-Boulder a cappella groups for a single festival with performances from every group.

== Legacy ==
The group has existed for over 60 years, meaning a number of generations have interacted with the Buffoons at some point or another. As the oldest a cappella group, not only at the University of Colorado, but in Colorado in general, the Buffoons are a progenitor to many a cappella groups at CU and across Colorado today. This includes CU's six other a cappella groups, In The Buff, Extreme Measures, On The Rocks, Mile 21, One Note Stand, and On That Note, as well as groups like New Wizard Oil Combination, which is composed of Buffoons alumni. Having performed all across Colorado, the Rocky Mountain region, and the western United States as a whole, garnered local and national attention, the Buffoons continue to be committed to the idea that Dr. Thorne proposed to the CU student body in 1961, that given the great size and diversity of the University of Colorado's student population, creating an a cappella group that can entertain and inspire shouldn't be any issue. The group still welcomes back alumni every 5 years during the university's homecoming weekend to make sure the legacy of the group is seen and taken to heart by the newest members.

== Notable alumni ==
- Dr. Oakleigh “Oak” Thorne II: founder, conservationist
- Don Grusin: founder, American jazz musician and record producer
- Roger Nelson: founder
- Jojo Davis: writer of “Tribute"
- Mike Houston: American actor
- David Bashford: American music producer and songwriter
- Spence Hood: American singer/songwriter

== Discography ==
=== Albums ===
- Songs by the CU BUFFoons, 1963 (LP) (Released on Streaming in 2022)
- Quit’cha, 1965 (LP)
- For You, 1967 (LP)
- Those Magnificent Men, 1969 (LP)
- Hangin’ On, 1972 (LP)
- Colorado Trail, 1976 (LP)
- Live at Tulagi, 1978 (LP)
- Bingo Time with Carlos, 1987 (CD)
- Happy Hour, 1995 (CD)
- Fine Malt A’Cappella, 1998 (CD)
- No Time for Love, 2002 (CD)
- So They Say, 2005 (CD)
- A Night at the Zoo, 2007 (CD)
- Bell Time, 2010 (CD)
- Under the Arches, 2012 (Streaming and CD)
- Songs from the Grove, 2015 (Streaming and CD)
- Christmas Love, 2019 (Streaming and CD)
- Carved From Oak, 2023 (Streaming and CD)

=== EPs ===
- Carved From Oak (Bonus Tracks), 2023 (Streaming and CD)

=== Singles ===
- Put Your Records On, 2023 (Streaming Only)
- The Anthem of Mr. Dark, 2023 (Streaming Only)

=== Featured on ===
- Ben Folds Presents: University A Cappella!, 2009 (Streaming and CD), “Landed"
- Voices Only 2012 College A Cappella, 2012 (Streaming and CD), “The Great Debate"
- BOCA 2013: Best of College A Cappella, 2013 (Streaming and CD), “The Great Debate"
