= Voices in Your Head =

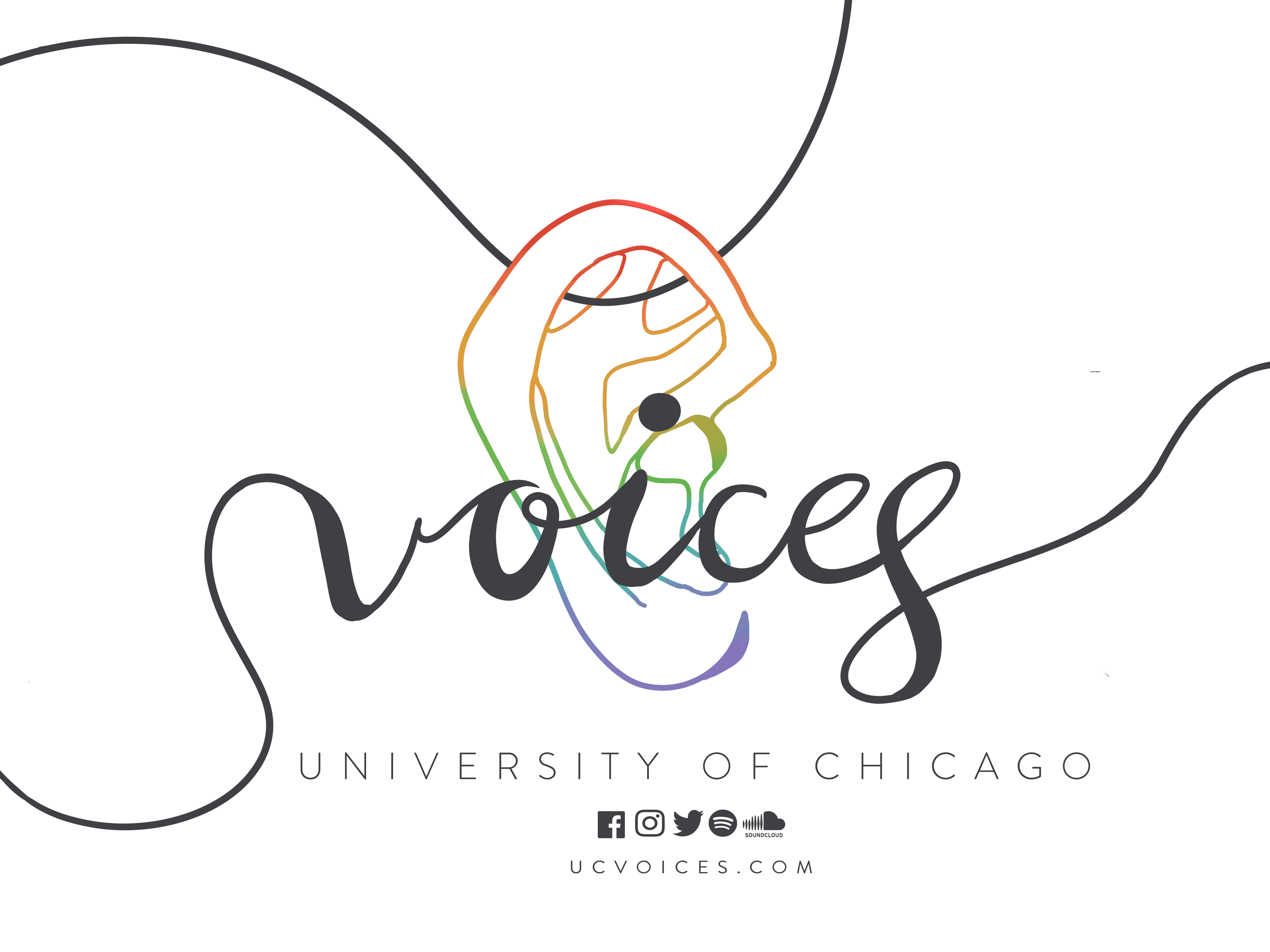

Background information
- Origin: University of Chicago, Chicago, Illinois, United States
- Genres: A Cappella
- Years active: 1998 – present
- Label: A Cappella Records
- Website: voicesinyourhead.org

Voices in Your Head is a student-run a cappella group from the University of Chicago who aim to "push the bounds of contemporary a cappella." Founded in 1998, the group has consisted of both undergraduate and graduate students whose studies range from Economics to Music to MD/PhD programs. Its unique repertoire includes original pieces, as well as an eclectic mix of pop, R&B, Jazz, and alternative music. Voices competes regularly in the International Championship of Collegiate A Cappella (ICCA) and releases studio recordings of their arrangements.

== History ==
=== 1998–2008 ===
Voices in Your Head was formed in the fall of 1998 by members who realized there were no 'funky' performance organizations at the University of Chicago. They released their first live album, Sesquipedalia, in 2000, their first studio album, On Point, in 2002, and their second studio album, Songs for Padded Rooms, in 2005.

=== 2008–2014 ===
Note To Self, their third studio album which was released on May 23, 2008, received a strong Recorded A Cappella Review Board review and contained a track ("Magic") selected for the 2008 edition of the international a cappella compilation, Voices Only. Noted author Nick Hornby also included "Magic" from Note To Self in his 2008 playlist for the New York Times.

On February 17, 2009, Ben Folds announced that "Magic" would appear on his 2009 album Ben Folds Presents: University A Cappella!, calling it "a hell of a cool place to live for three and a half minutes." NBC Washington commented on the group's contribution, "Magic," saying "the arrangement is so different from the original that the song is a completely unique artifact–which should be the goal of any group, a cappella or otherwise, when attempting a cover." In an interview with Entertainment Weekly, Ben Folds commented: "There’s a group from the University of Chicago called Voices in Your Head that sings 'Magic' on the record, and to me they’re in a different league from the rest of the groups." As part of the tour to support the album release, Voices in Your Head performed live with Ben Folds on March 19, 2009, in Milwaukee, WI at the Eagles Ballroom.

That same year, Voices competed for the first time in the International Championship of Collegiate A Cappella for the first time. In 2011, Voices finished third at their Midwest Quarterfinal; in 2012, they came in first at both the Quarterfinal and the Semifinal, progressing to ICCA finals in New York City, where they finished fourth overall. In addition, they competed in the inaugural Boston Sings collegiate competition, where they placed first.

The group's next album, I Used to Live Alone, was released on May 21, 2011, and marked Voices' emergence into the national a cappella scene. Several tracks met critical acclaim in the a cappella community up to a year before its release: the tracks "I'd Like To," "Boomerang," and "Sharp" were all selected for national a cappella compilation albums. "Boomerang" also won “Best Scholastic Original” in the 2011 CARA (Contemporary A Cappella Recording Awards). The album received positive reviews from the Recorded A Cappella Review Board (RARB), and was selected as one of RARB's picks of the year. In 2012, "I Used To Live Alone" was nominated for five CARAs, winning Best Mixed Collegiate Arrangement (Chris Rishel, for "I'd Like To") and runner up places for Best Mixed Collegiate Album, Song, and Solo.

=== 2014–2020 ===
Voices returned to ICCA competition in 2014, falling short at the Midwest Semifinal after placing second at the Quarterfinal stage. The next year, however, after finishing first at their Midwest Quarterfinal and Semifinal, the group returned to Finals. The 2015 ICCA Finals, held on April 18 at New York City's Beacon Theatre, saw Voices finish 2nd to the University of Southern California's SoCal VoCals, as well as win Outstanding Soloist at Finals (Shubha Vedula).

The group took 2016 to tour in California and on the East Coast, where they performed for President Barack Obama and First Lady Michelle Obama at a White House holiday party. 2016 also saw the group complete LIGHTS, its sixth studio album, which was released in July of that year. LIGHTS would go on to win CARAs for Best Mixed Collegiate Album and Best Collegiate Original Song (Shubha Vedula and Chris Rishel, for "Feel So Bad").

Voices competed in ICCA again in 2017, this time in the Great Lakes region. After placing first at their Quarterfinal and Semifinal, the group again advanced to Finals. At the Beacon Theatre, Voices finished 2nd to the Northeastern University Nor'easters on April 22, 2017, and won the award for Outstanding Arrangement for “How Deep is Your Love” (Will Cabaniss).

2018 marked the 20th Anniversary of the founding of Voices in Your Head. To celebrate, they competed in ICCA with an entirely original set, being the first group to ever do so. The group advanced to Finals once again, placing first and winning Outstanding Arrangement at both their Quarterfinal and their Semifinal. Voices placed 3rd at Finals, behind The SoCal VoCals of University of Southern California and Upper Structure of Berklee College of Music. The final event of the year, their 20th Anniversary Concert, reunited all alumni to celebrate the group's growth.

Voices released their seventh studio album Begin Again in 2019, which featured their 2017 and 2018 ICCA sets. Begin Again was selected as RARB's Album of the Year in 2019 and Album of the Decade in 2020, with "Between Us" being selected as the 2019 Track of the Year. Begin Again also went on to win 6 CARAs, while songs "Between Us,” "How Long,” and “Part of Me” were featured on Voices Only 2019, BOCA (Best of College A Cappella) 2019, and Voices Only 2020, respectively. It received a perfect score of 5 in its RARB review, and was called “one of the most original a cappella recordings of the past decade.”

Wanting to explore different creative avenues for a cappella sets, the group took to the National A Cappella Convention (NACC) stage for the first time in 2019, placing as a runner-up behind The Nor’easters of Northeastern University and alongside the Green Tones of the University of North Texas. They also won an award for Outstanding Scene Painting.

Voices returned to ICCA in 2020, placing second at the Great Lakes Quarterfinal and taking home awards for Outstanding Arrangement, Outstanding Choreography (Natalia Rodriguez), and Outstanding Soloist (Hillary Yuen). Sadly, the competition was canceled due to the COVID-19 pandemic before the group could advance to the Great Lakes Semifinal. In the face of ICCA being canceled, Voices organized “The Remedy Project”, welcoming all ICCA and ICHSA competitors to lend their voices to create an international a cappella collaboration. The project, an asynchronous rendition of “Remedy,” originally performed by Son Lux, received over 168 submissions and showcased the love competitors hold for each other and the music they create.

=== 2021–Present ===
In 2021, Voices welcomed 9 new members and set out to compete in ICCA, despite the fact that the majority of the group had never sung with each other in-person before. After placing second at their Quarterfinal and third at their Semifinal, the group won the Wildcard round and advanced to the 2022 ICCA Finals at the Town Hall in New York City for the fifth time in the group's history. This same year, their newly released single “Wolves” won 3 CARAs and was featured on BOCA 2022. “My Day Will Come”, released shortly after, was featured on Voices Only 2022, BOCA 2023, and selected as RARB's Single of the Year.

Voices returned to compete in ICCA in 2023, receiving first place at the Great Lakes Quarterfinal. Here, the group took home special awards for Outstanding Arrangement and Outstanding Vocal Percussion for the entire set (Katie Ko and In Hyeok Oh, respectively). The group continued to the Great Lakes Semifinal, securing third place while also earning recognition for Outstanding Choreography for the entire set (Lina Klak, Joshua Park, Makila Sims).

2023 also marked Voices’ 25th anniversary, celebrated with an anniversary concert. This memorable event served as a tribute to the group's evolution, featuring beloved songs from various eras, in addition to solo performances by alumni of the group. In recognition of the group's recent achievements, the current members performed their acclaimed 2023 ICCA set and debuted three new arrangements, including a new song, “Now I’m Listening”, written to honor Voices’ legacy by alum Will Cabaniss. The concert brought together a wide range of alumni, including some of the group's founding members, to celebrate the origins of Voices and its continued growth over the past 25 years.

== Awards ==
| 2026 | Boston Sings (BOSS) A Cappella Festival | Overall | 2nd Place |
| 2026 | Boston Sings (BOSS) A Cappella Festival | Outstanding Vocal Percussion | Winner, Vanessa Vaz for the entire set |
| 2025 | ICCA Finals | Overall | Finalist |
| 2025 | ICCA Great Lakes Semifinal | Overall | 1st Place |
| 2025 | ICCA Great Lakes Semifinal | Outstanding Arrangement | Winner, Ellie Gilbert-Bair for the entire set |
| 2025 | ICCA Great Lakes Semifinal | Outstanding Choreography | Winner, Makila Sims for the entire set |
| 2025 | ICCA Great Lakes Quarterfinal | Overall | 2nd Place |
| 2025 | ICCA Great Lakes Quarterfinal | Outstanding Arrangement | Winner, Ellie Gilbert-Bair for "Weird Fishes" |
| 2025 | ICCA Great Lakes Quarterfinal | Outstanding Choreography | Winner, Makila Sims for "Weird Fishes" |
| 2025 | BOCA (Best of Collegiate A Cappella) | BOCA 2025 | "Snakeskin" |
| 2024 | Los Angeles A Cappella Festival (LAAF) Scholastic Competition | Overall | 1st Place |
| 2024 | Los Angeles A Cappella Festival (LAAF) Scholastic Competition | Outstanding Arrangement | Winner, Ellie Gilbert-Bair for the entire set |
| 2024 | Los Angeles A Cappella Festival (LAAF) Scholastic Competition | Outstanding Soloist | Winner, Cilcan Pierce for "You and You" |
| 2024 | Contemporary A Cappella Recording Awards (CARAs) | Best Mixed Collegiate EP | Runner-Up, Voices in Your Head for World We Created |
| 2024 | Contemporary A Cappella Recording Awards (CARAs) | Best Mixed Collegiate Song | Runner-Up, "World We Created" from World We Created |
| 2024 | Contemporary A Cappella Recording Awards (CARAs) | Best Electronic/Experimental Song | Runner-Up, "Snakeskin" from World We Created |
| 2024 | Contemporary A Cappella Recording Awards (CARAs) | Best Mixed Collegiate Arrangement | Nominated, Katie Ko for "World We Created" |
| 2024 | Contemporary A Cappella Recording Awards (CARAs) | Best Mixed Collegiate Lead Vocal | Nominated, Lina Klak and Ben Sokolow for "World We Created" |
| 2024 | Contemporary A Cappella Recording Awards (CARAs) | Best Original Song by a Non-Scholastic Composer | Nominated, Will Cabaniss and Carly Wood for "Now I'm Listening" |
| 2024 | A Cappella Video Awards (AVAs) | Outstanding Live Video | Nominated, Lina Klak, Katie Ko, and Will Cabaniss for "2023 ICCA Set" |
| 2024 | BOCA (Best of Collegiate A Cappella) | BOCA 2024 | "Now I'm Listening" |
| 2023 | ICCA Great Lakes Semifinal | Overall | 3rd Place |
| 2023 | ICCA Great Lakes Semifinal | Outstanding Choreography | Winner, Lina Klak, Joshua Park, and Makila Sims for the entire set |
| 2023 | ICCA Great Lakes Quarterfinal | Overall | 1st Place |
| 2023 | ICCA Great Lakes Quarterfinal | Outstanding Arrangement | Winner, Katie Ko for the entire set |
| 2023 | ICCA Great Lakes Quarterfinal | Outstanding Vocal Percussion | Winner, In Hyeok Oh for the entire set |
| 2023 | BOCA (Best of Collegiate A Cappella) | BOCA 2023 | "My Day Will Come" |
| 2022 | ICCA Finals | Overall | Finalist |
| 2022 | ICCA Wild Card | Overall | 1st Place |
| 2022 | ICCA Great Lakes Semifinal | Overall | 3rd Place |
| 2022 | ICCA Great Lakes Quarterfinal | Overall | 1st Runner-Up |
| 2022 | Contemporary A Cappella Recording Awards (CARAs) | Best Electronic/Experimental Song | Winner, Voices in Your Head for "Wolves" |
| 2022 | Contemporary A Cappella Recording Awards (CARAs) | Best Mixed Collegiate Arrangement | Winner, Will Cabaniss for "Wolves" |
| 2022 | Contemporary A Cappella Recording Awards (CARAs) | Best Mixed Collegiate Song | Winner, Voices in Your Head for "Wolves" |
| 2022 | BOCA (Best of Collegiate A Cappella) | BOCA 2022 | "Wolves" |
| 2022 | RARB (Recorded A Cappella Review Board) Picks of the Year | Single of the Year | "My Day Will Come" |
| 2022 | Voices Only | Voices Only 2022 | "My Day Will Come" |
| 2020 | Contemporary A Cappella Recording Awards (CARAs) | Best Electronic/Experimental Song | Winner, Voices in Your Head for "Between Us" |
| 2020 | Contemporary A Cappella Recording Awards (CARAs) | Best Original Song by a Scholastic Group | Winner, Will Cabaniss and Kate Connors for "Between Us" |
| 2020 | Contemporary A Cappella Recording Awards (CARAs) | Best Pop Album | Winner, Voices in Your Head for Begin Again |
| 2020 | Contemporary A Cappella Recording Awards (CARAs) | Best Mixed Collegiate Album | Winner, Voices in Your Head for Begin Again |
| 2020 | Contemporary A Cappella Recording Awards (CARAs) | Best Mixed Collegiate Song | Runner-Up, "Between Us" from Begin Again |
| 2020 | Contemporary A Cappella Recording Awards (CARAs) | Best Mixed Collegiate Arrangement | Runner-Up, Will Cabaniss for "Between Us" |
| 2020 | RARB (Recorded A Cappella Review Board) Picks of the Decade | Single | "Burn" (2014) |
| 2020 | RARB (Recorded A Cappella Review Board) Picks of the Decade | Album | Begin Again (2019) |
| 2020 | ICCA Great Lakes Quarterfinal | Overall | 1st Runner-Up |
| 2020 | ICCA Great Lakes Quarterfinal | Outstanding Arrangement | Winner, Voices in Your Head for "O Superman" |
| 2020 | ICCA Great Lakes Quarterfinal | Outstanding Choreography | Winner, Natalia Rodriguez for the entire set |
| 2020 | ICCA Great Lakes Quarterfinal | Outstanding Soloist | Winner, Hillary Yuen for "My Day Will Come" |
| 2020 | Voices Only | Voices Only 2020 | "Part of Me" |
| 2019 | NACC (The National A Cappella Convention) | Overall | 1st Runner-Up |
| 2019 | RARB (Recorded A Cappella Review Board) Picks of the Year | Album of the Year | Begin Again |
| 2019 | RARB (Recorded A Cappella Review Board) Picks of the Year | Track of the Year | "Between Us" |
| 2019 | RARB (Recorded A Cappella Review Board) Picks of the Year | Single of the Year | "Sing for Myself" |
| 2019 | BOCA (Best of Collegiate A Cappella) | BOCA 2019 | "How Long" |
| 2019 | Voices Only | Voices Only 2019, Vol. 1 | "Between Us" |
| 2018 | ICCA Finals | Overall | 3rd Place |
| 2018 | ICCA Great Lakes Semifinal | Overall | 1st Place |
| 2018 | ICCA Great Lakes Semifinal | Outstanding Arrangement | Winner, Will Cabaniss for "Sing for Myself" |
| 2018 | ICCA Great Lakes Quarterfinal | Overall | 1st Place |
| 2018 | ICCA Great Lakes Quarterfinal | Outstanding Arrangement | Winner, Will Cabaniss for "How Long" |
| 2017 | ICCA Finals | Overall | 1st Runner-Up |
| 2017 | ICCA Finals | Outstanding Arrangement | Winner, Will Cabaniss for "How Deep Is Your Love" |
| 2017 | ICCA Great Lakes Semifinal | Overall | 1st Place |
| 2017 | ICCA Great Lakes Semifinal | Outstanding Arrangement | Winner, Will Cabaniss for the entire set |
| 2017 | ICCA Great Lakes Quarterfinal | Overall | 1st Place |
| 2017 | Contemporary A Cappella Recording Awards (CARAs) | Best Mixed Collegiate Album | Winner, Voices in Your Head for "LIGHTS" |
| 2017 | Contemporary A Cappella Recording Awards (CARAs) | Best Original Song by a Scholastic Group | Winner, Shubha Vedula and Chris Rishel for "Feel So Bad" |
| 2017 | Contemporary A Cappella Recording Awards (CARAs) | Best Mixed Collegiate Song | Nominated, Voices in Your Head for "Bang My Head" |
| 2017 | Contemporary A Cappella Recording Awards (CARAs) | Best Professional Arrangement for a Scholastic Group | Runner-Up, Chris Rishel for "Feel So Bad" |
| 2017 | BOCA (Best of Collegiate A Cappella) | BOCA 2017 | "Show Me How You Burlesque" |
| 2017 | Sing | Sing 13: Superstition | "Feel So Bad" |
| 2016 | Contemporary A Cappella Recording Awards (CARAs) | Best Mixed Collegiate Solo | 1st Runner Up, Shubha Vedula for "Show Me How You Burlesque" |
| 2016 | Contemporary A Cappella Recording Awards (CARAs) | Best Professional Arrangement for a Scholastic Group | 1st Runner Up, Chris Rishel for "Heroes Listen" |
| 2016 | BOCA (Best of Collegiate A Cappella) | BOCA 2016 | "Heroes Listen" |
| 2016 | Voices Only | Voices Only 2016 | "Feel So Bad" |
| 2015 | ICCA Finals | Overall | 1st Runner Up |
| 2015 | ICCA Finals | Outstanding Soloist | Winner, Shubha Vedula |
| 2015 | ICCA Midwest Semifinals | Overall | 1st Place |
| 2015 | ICCA Midwest Semifinals | Outstanding Soloist | Winner, Shubha Vedula |
| 2015 | ICCA Midwest Semifinals | Outstanding Choreography | Winner, Ana Isabel Martinez, Tyler Neenan, & Jaclyn Sattler |
| 2015 | ICCA Midwest Quarterfinal | Overall | 1st Place |
| 2015 | ICCA Midwest Quarterfinal | Outstanding Soloist | Winner, Shubha Vedula |
| 2015 | ICCA Midwest Quarterfinal | Outstanding Arrangement | Winner, Voices in Your Head for "Bang My Head" |
| 2015 | ICCA Midwest Quarterfinal | Outstanding Vocal Percussion | Winner, Kevin Qian & Thomas Seo |
| 2015 | BOCA (Best of Collegiate A Cappella) | BOCA 2015 | "Burn" |
| 2015 | Contemporary A Cappella Recording Awards (CARAs) | Best Mixed Collegiate Song | 1st Runner up, "Burn" |
| 2015 | Contemporary A Cappella Recording Awards (CARAs) | Best Original Song by a Scholastic Group | Nominated, Ivan Pyzow for "Suena Asi" |
| 2015 | Contemporary A Cappella Recording Awards (CARAs) | Best Professional Arrangement for a Scholastic Group | Winner, Chris Rishel for "Burn" |
| 2014 | BOCA (Best of Collegiate A Cappella) | Best of BOCA: The First 20 Years | "We Found Love" |
| 2014 | BOCA (Best of Collegiate A Cappella) | BOCA 2014 | "Bad Moon Rising" |
| 2014 | Sing | Sing 11: One Louder | "Burn" |
| 2014 | Voices Only | Voices Only 2014 | "Suena Así" |
| 2014 | ICCA Midwest Semifinal | Outstanding Vocal Percussion | Winner, Kevin Qian |
| 2014 | ICCA Midwest Quarterfinal | Overall | 1st Runner-Up |
| 2014 | ICCA Midwest Quarterfinal | Outstanding Choreography | Winner, Ana Isabel Martinez, Tyler Neenan, & Jaclyn Sattler |
| 2014 | ICCA Midwest Quarterfinal | Outstanding Vocal Percussion | Winner, Kevin Qian |
| 2013 | Contemporary A Cappella Recording Awards (CARAs) | Best Mixed Collegiate Arrangement | Winner, Chris Rishel for "We Found Love" |
| 2013 | Contemporary A Cappella Recording Awards (CARAs) | Best Mixed Collegiate Song | Winner, "We Found Love" |
| 2013 | Contemporary A Cappella Recording Awards (CARAs) | Best Scholastic Original Song | Nominated, Chris Rishel and Brianne Holland for "Life of the Mind" |
| 2013 | BOCA (Best of Collegiate A Cappella) | BOCA 2013 | "We Found Love" |
| 2013 | Voices Only | Voices Only 2013 | "We Found Love" |
| 2013 | A Cappella Community Awards (ACAs) | Favorite Collegiate Album | Runner-Up, I Used to Live Alone |
| 2013 | A Cappella Community Awards (ACAs) | Favorite Competition Set | Runner-Up, 2012 ICCA Finals |
| 2013 | A Cappella Community Awards (ACAs) | Favorite Mixed Collegiate Group | Runner-Up |
| 2013 | A Cappella Community Awards (ACAs) | Favorite Music Video | Runner-Up, "Titanium (song)" |
| 2013 | A Cappella Community Awards (ACAs) | Favorite Arranger | Nominated, Chris Rishel |
| 2013 | A Cappella Community Awards (ACAs) | Favorite Original Song | Nominated, "Life of the Mind" |
| 2013 | A Cappella Community Awards (ACAs) | Favorite Songwriter | Nominated, Chris Rishel |
| 2012 | Contemporary A Cappella Recording Awards (CARAs) | Best Mixed Collegiate Arrangement | Winner, Chris Rishel, "I'd Like To" |
| 2012 | Contemporary A Cappella Recording Awards (CARAs) | Best Mixed Collegiate Album | Runner-Up, I Used to Live Alone |
| 2012 | Contemporary A Cappella Recording Awards (CARAs) | Best Mixed Collegiate Song | Runner-Up, "I'd Like To" (opb Corinne Bailey Rae) |
| 2012 | Contemporary A Cappella Recording Awards (CARAs) | Best Mixed Collegiate Solo | Runner-Up, Elspeth Michaels, "I'd Like To" |
| 2012 | Contemporary A Cappella Recording Awards (CARAs) | Best Scholastic Original | Nominated, Chris Rishel & Zachary Madden, "Sharp" (opb Voices in Your Head) |
| 2012 | Sing | Sing 9: Supernovem | "We Found Love" |
| 2012 | Voices Only | Voices Only 2012 | "Titanium" |
| 2012 | ICCA Finals | Overall | 4th Place |
| 2012 | ICCA Midwest Semifinal | Overall | 1st Place |
| 2012 | ICCA Midwest Semifinal | Outstanding Arrangement | Winner, Chris Rishel |
| 2012 | ICCA Midwest Semifinal | Outstanding Choreography | Winner, Alex Gilewicz and Ryan Bober |
| 2012 | ICCA Midwest Quarterfinal | Overall | 1st Place |
| 2012 | ICCA Midwest Quarterfinal | Outstanding Arrangement | Winner, Chris Rishel, "We Found Love" (opb Rihanna feat. Calvin Harris) & "Titanium" (opb David Guetta feat. Sia) |
| 2012 | ICCA Midwest Quarterfinal | Outstanding Choreography | Winner, Alex Gilewicz and Ryan Bober |
| 2012 | Boston Sings (BOSS) Collegiate Competition | Overall | 1st Place |
| 2011 | CARAs | Best Scholastic Original | Winner, Chris Rishel & Elspeth Michaels, "Boomerang" |
| 2011 | RARB (Recorded A Cappella Review Board) Picks of the Year | Album of the Year | I Used to Live Alone |
| 2011 | RARB (Recorded A Cappella Review Board) Picks of the Year | Song of the Year | "Boomerang" |
| 2011 | RARB (Recorded A Cappella Review Board) Picks of the Year | Song of the Year | "I'd Like To" |
| 2011 | BOCA (Best of Collegiate A Cappella) | BOCA 2011 | "I'd Like To" |
| 2011 | Sing | Sing 8: Too Cubed | "Sharp" |
| 2011 | ACAs | Favorite Mixed Collegiate Group | Nominated |
| 2011 | ACAs | Favorite Female Vocalist | Nominated, Elspeth Michaels |
| 2011 | ACAs | Favorite Original A Cappella Song | Nominated, "Boomerang" (opb Voices in Your Head) |
| 2011 | ICCA Midwest Quarterfinal | Overall | 2nd Runner-Up |
| 2011 | ICCA Midwest Quarterfinal | Outstanding Arrangement | Winner, Chris Rishel, "Break Your Heart" (opb Taio Cruz) |
| 2010 | Sing | Sing 7: Lucky | "Boomerang" |
| 2010 | Voices Only | Voices Only 2010 | "I'd Like To" |
| 2009 | Ben Folds | Ben Folds Presents: University A Cappella | "Magic" |
| 2009 | Voices Only | Voices Only 2009 | "Supermassive Black Hole" (opb Muse) |
| 2008 | Voices Only | Voices Only 2008 | "Magic" (opb Ben Folds Five) |
