= Gigg.com =

American computer software company

- Founded: 2013
- Founder: Richard Guymon
- Headquarters: American Fork, Utah

Gigg.com is a software company founded in American Fork, Utah that offers businesses tools and services to build their brand using internal and external data.

== History ==
In the beginning, Gigg was known as a platform offering opportunities for local bands to play in big venues with high-profile bands. Musicians would upload videos to the company's website, and compete to score the most Gigg Votes, Facebook Likes, and Twitter Tweets. Winners of the competitions received organized promotion and concert bookings alongside established artists.

In January 2013, the company released a mobile app (Gigg) for Android and iOS devices. The app was a search engine for music and a platform to share lyrics with friends, both within the Gigg app social interface and on Facebook. The app accesses a database 2.5 million songs, with song lyrics linked to the downloadable music on ITunes.

In 2013, the Gigg competition platform became known as "Gigg STAGE" which continues to provide opportunities for local musicians to compete in events hosted by venues, labels, and industry professionals.

== Events ==
From 2011 to 2013, Gigg hosted the "Opening Act" competition for the Stadium of Fire event in Provo, Utah, a 4th of July concert and firework show with an attendance of about 55,000. Headlining artists have included Kelly Clarkson, Carly Rae Jepsen, and The Beach Boys.

In 2012, Gigg hosted a contest to open for Andy Grammer at The Venue in Salt Lake City, Utah. The winners were the Mosaic Whispers.

In 2013, Gigg hosted a contest for a chance to open for P Diddy, Skylar Grey, and Warren G in the Rags 2 Riches Live event at the 2013 SXSW (South by Southwest) music festival in Austin.
