= Compulsive Lyres =

American a cappella group

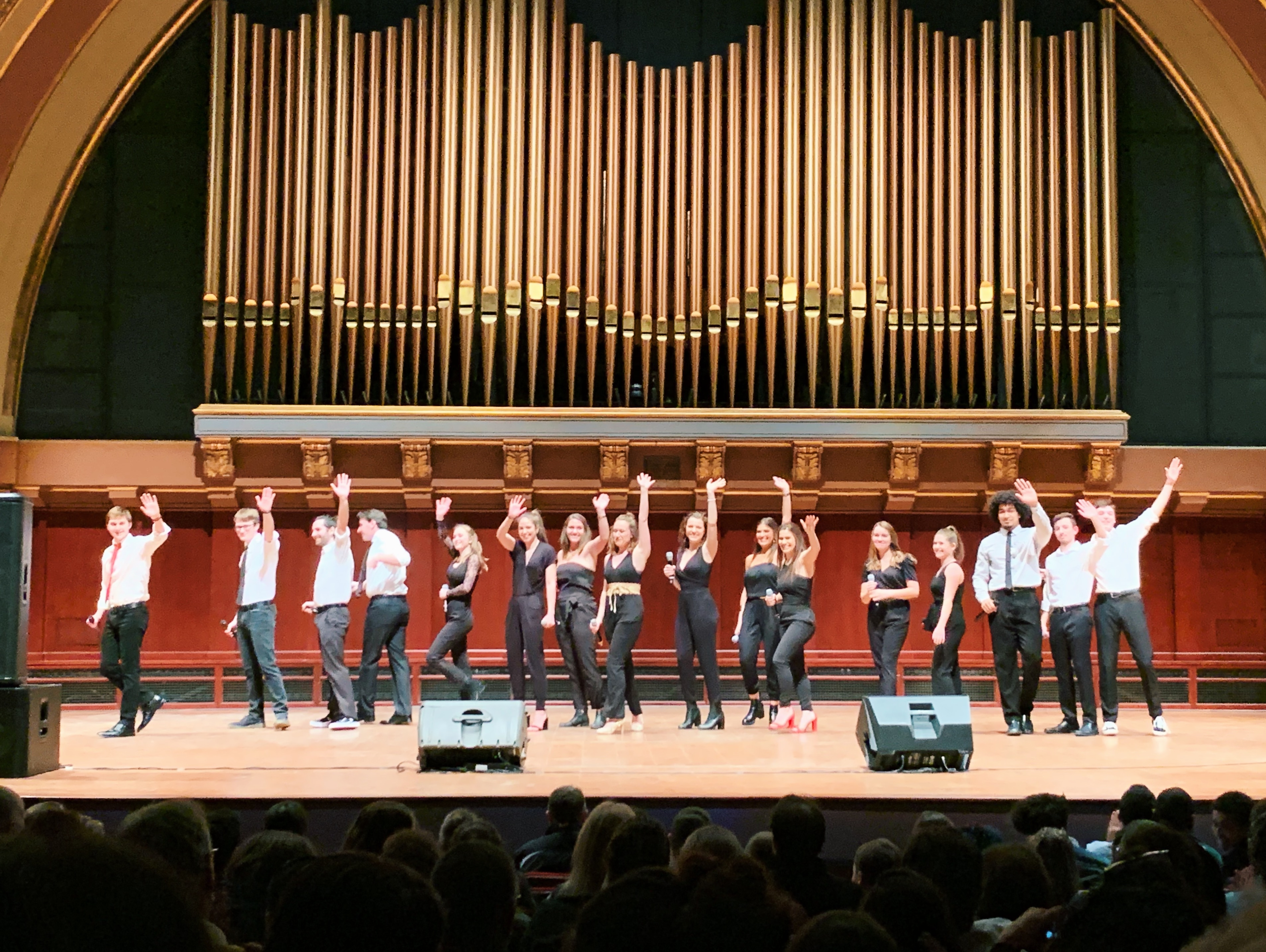
- The Compulsive Lyres performing at the 2019 ICCA Quarterfinals

Background information
- Origin: University of Michigan
- Genres: A cappella
- Years active: 1997–present

The Compulsive Lyres is an a cappella group at the University of Michigan. The group includes both music and non-music majors and sings various arrangements of pop, rock, and R&B songs.

The Compulsive Lyres won the International Championship of Collegiate A Cappella (ICCA) in 2002, and remain the first and only Michigan group to win that honor. Following their win, the Lyres were invited to perform on The Today Show with Matt Lauer, and were featured on the Best of College A Cappella album.

The Lyres hold auditions every September following U of M's "Acarush." Audition sign-ups take place in person on campus as well as on their website.

== History ==
=== The Early Lyres ===
The Compulsive Lyres began as an outgrowth of a Greek Week sing team with the theme "Greek to Mi." In the Spring of 1997, the Pi Kappa Alpha fraternity and Alpha Phi sorority became the first sing team in the history of Greek Week to receive a perfect score. That following summer students decided that the experience was so much fun and the result so successful that it would be worth a try to keep the group going as an a cappella group. In the fall of 1997, the a cappella group of the University of Michigan Greek System met for the first time under the name Greek to Mi.

In its first year, the group had many hurdles to overcome. The initial group was un-auditioned—any member of the 1997 sing team was welcome. It was quickly discovered that both the level of commitment and musical ability needed for an a cappella group was substantially different from the level needed for Greek Week. In January 1998, the group was reorganized and auditions were held. By the end of the auditions, the group had 14 members from 10 different fraternities and sororities and had changed its name to "Compulsive Lyres". Although the level of dedication and overall musical ability was increased after the reorganization, the group's purpose remained primarily social in nature—music was a clear second. Those who came looking for friendship and camaraderie found plenty—the early group resulted in great friendships and even one marriage(!), but those who came seeking a serious devotion to a cappella music were often disappointed.

In January 2001, the group decided that they were going to take the Lyres in a new direction. The Lyres severed their formal association with the Greek system, opening the audition process to the entire campus. With musical excellence as the primary goal, Lyres searched out new members. Through the summer, the group prepared for what was to be the ultimate test—if the group actually dedicated a year to musical excellence, would they be able to succeed?

The answer was a resounding yes. In the fall of 2001, Lyres worked hard and reaped the benefits. Auditions resulted in an extremely strong collection of musicians, and a fall retreat brought the group closer than it had ever been, so close, in fact, that retreats are still an integral part of the Lyres experience today. Their fall concert, the 1st Annual Michigan A Cappella Festival, was a huge success, featuring 9 of the 12 active groups on campus over two nights. In its first year, MAC-Fest, as it came to be called, became the largest a cappella show of the year at The University of Michigan. As noted earlier, the Lyres largest success came in 2002, with their victory at the International Finals of the ICCAs, establishing the Lyres as a new power in the Michigan A Cappella community.

=== Recent History ===
Since their 2002 ICCA championship, the Lyres have continued to work as an a cappella group on campus. In particular, the Lyres have also begun a series of new traditions, showing that their presence in the a cappella community is as strong as ever. For one, the Lyres have begun to perform at bigger and better events. Not only have the Lyres become involved with Michigan Athletics, singing the national anthem at a variety of sporting events, but they have also opened for a number of notable recording artists, like Ben Folds.

The Lyres have found success with a series of performances they call "Friday Shows"—performing a free show every Friday around the campus of the University of Michigan. Recently, they have begun releasing a short film at their fall semester concert—such as spoofing the Harry Potter Series, releasing "Harry Potter and the Goblet of Lyres." They are the only Michigan group to have such a tradition.

In 2012, the Lyres competed in the ICCA once again, attempting to become just the third group in collegiate a cappella history to win the ICCA title twice. They now try to compete in the competition every other school year. Having most recently competed in ICCAs in February 2019, the group had the chance to perform in the University of Michigan's "Hill Auditorium," where Co-Music Director Emma Carter received the award for "Outstanding Vocal Percussionist."

In 2023, the Lyres returned to the ICCA Great Lakes Quarterfinal in Ann Arbor. Emma Carter was once again awarded "Outstanding Vocal Percussionist" for their performance. Most recently, The Lyres competed in the 2025 Quarterfinals with their show "Time Passing". The group placed third in the competition, and Valerie Huang, their soloist for Envy the Leaves, was recognized with the "Outstanding Soloist" award.

== Music ==
The Compulsive Lyres have recorded one studio album, an EP, and one single.

=== Bury a Friend - Single ===
No.	Title	Writer(s)	Length
1.	"Bury a Friend"	Billie Eilish	3:24

=== Slow Dancing in the Dark - Single ===
No.	Title	Writer(s)	Length
1.	"Slow Dancing in the Dark"	Joji	3:30

=== Keep Us Together, An EP ===
No.	Title	Writer(s)	Length
1.	"Drive"	Miley Cyrus	2:42
2.	"The Chain"	Fleetwood Mac	3:19
3.	"Past Lives"	BORNS	4:23

=== 12 Step Program ===
No.	Title	Writer(s)	Length
1.	"Beautiful Oblivion"	Elida Young	3:22
2.	"Torn"	Natalie Imbruglia	4:05
3.	"Africa"	Toto	4:58
4.	"Stay"	Dave Matthews	3:12
5.	"Limp"	Fiona Apple	3:12
6.	"Hard To Say I'm Sorry"	Chicago	3:06
7.	"Hands Clean"	Alanis Morissette	3:52
8.	"It's Not Easy To Be Me"	David Gray	3:29
9.	"Devil Went Down To Georgia"	Charlie Daniels	3:40
10.	"Somewhere Over The Rainbow"	Judy Garland	3:30
11.	"Still Haven't Found What I'm Looking For"	U2	5:41
12.	"That Lonesome Road"	James Taylor	3:01
