= Midnight Ramblers =

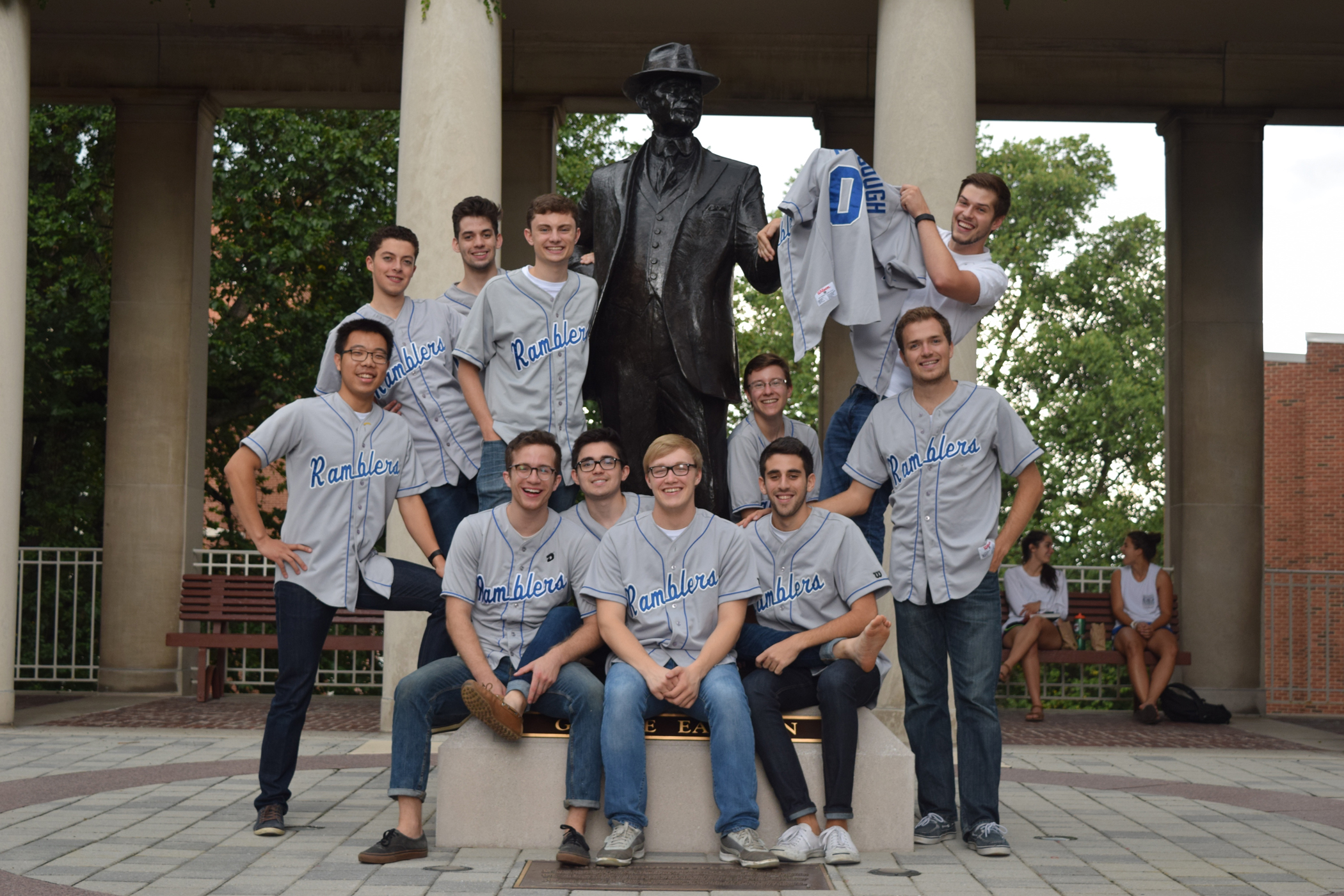
- The 2016-17 Ramblers pose with a George Eastman statue on the University of Rochester Campus

Background information
- Also known as: Ramblers, MR
- Origin: Rochester, New York, U.S.
- Genres: A cappella; pop
- Years active: 1998–present
- Website: midnightramblers.org

The Midnight Ramblers (Ramblers) are an award-winning TTBB a cappella group based at the University of Rochester. Since their founding in 1998, they have been entirely student organized and directed. They are also made up exclusively of members of Rochester's undergraduate community. The Ramblers finished third in the 2005 International Championship of Collegiate A Cappella; they were also the Mid-Atlantic Champions. In April 2008, they celebrated their tenth anniversary, with nearly every alumnus of the group in attendance. Following the show, they became the first undergraduate organization to sponsor a scholarship for incoming students at the university.

== History ==
The Midnight Ramblers were founded in 1998 by Jon Huang, then a sophomore at the University of Rochester, to focus on crowd-pleasing pop and rock styles instead of the classic a cappella repertoire.

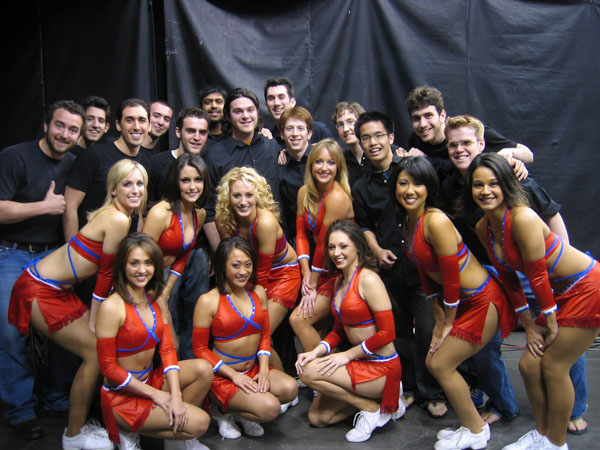
With the L.A. Clippers Cheerleading Team, before singing the National Anthem for Clippers/Lakers game, Spring 2005

The ensemble gave its first performance on April 30, 1998 in the University’s Rush Rhees Library. Their premiere set included "Some Kind of Wonderful", "Good Lovin’", "Truly Madly Deeply", and "Everybody Wants to Rule the World".

Since their inception, they have released eight full-length studio albums, including Ça C'est Bon, which garnered critical acclaim. Their music has been featured on numerous a cappella compilations including Sing 3, Sing 4, Voices Only 2007, Voices Only 2009, and Best of College A cappella 2008. They also placed third in the nation at the 2005 International Championship of Collegiate A Cappella finals held at the Lincoln Center for the Performing Arts in New York City.

== Shows ==
Each year the Ramblers perform regularly on the university campus, throughout the Rochester community, and across the country. Their largest concerts usually occur bi-annually towards the end of each fall and spring semester in the university’s 1,031 seat Strong Auditorium, the River Campus’s main performance venue. Each show traditionally has a "theme" which is played out over the course of concert through a series of videos and skits interspersed between sets of songs. These themes usually revolve around a common element of pop culture and/or TV and cinema, humorously rewritten to include the members of the group. Recent titles include "Midnight Ramblers of the Caribbean", "Midnight Ramblers and the Chocolate Factory", "Midnight Ramblers Horror Show", and "The Midnight Ramblers Host Saturday Night Live". Certain elements have made recurring appearances in these shows, especially though the interstitial short videos, including a stock footage clip of a building imploding and shots of River Campus food service workers, especially Wilson Commons cashier Dawn Marshall-Hosier. In 2006, a DVD compilation of these video shorts, as well as live concert footage, was released as Midnight Ramblers: The DVD.

In recent years, the advertising for these major Ramblers performances has changed to include different activities connected to the show intended to provide additional entertainment for the University community. These activities have usually taken the form of a scavenger hunt, with clues posted on the concert fliers leading to hidden prizes around campus, or, occasionally, at nearby Rochester landmarks, such as the University of Rochester Medical Center. In addition, the Ramblers have also been joined on stage by various professional guest artists from around the world, including FORK from Helsinki, Finland in Fall 2008 and, most recently, multi-platinum 80s Latin pop star Alondra.

== Tours ==
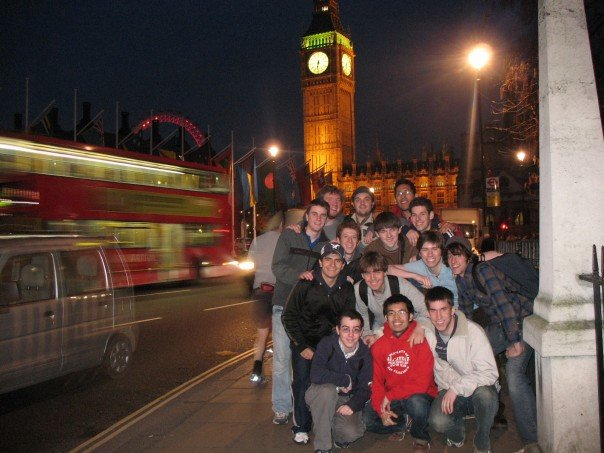
London Tour, Spring 2007

Beginning in 2003, the Ramblers have gone on their annual Spring Break Tour each March. Specific destinations vary from year to year, though the group has performed up and down the east and west coasts, as well as in London, England in 2007. These tours usually consist primarily of workshops and performances at local schools, but have also featured National Anthem renditions for professional sporting events, live radio concerts, as well as other, less conventional, performances, such as serving as the headlining entertainment act at the Microsoft Corporation’s annual St. Patrick’s Day party. Highlights from these tours often make their way into subsequent performances, such as in 2004 when the group performed a 10-minute musical about their encounter with a deer on U.S. Route 17 Alternate in South Carolina. The 2005 Spring Show, "The Real World", based on the popular MTV reality show, featured video exclusively from the recent tour to Los Angeles.

== The jersey ==
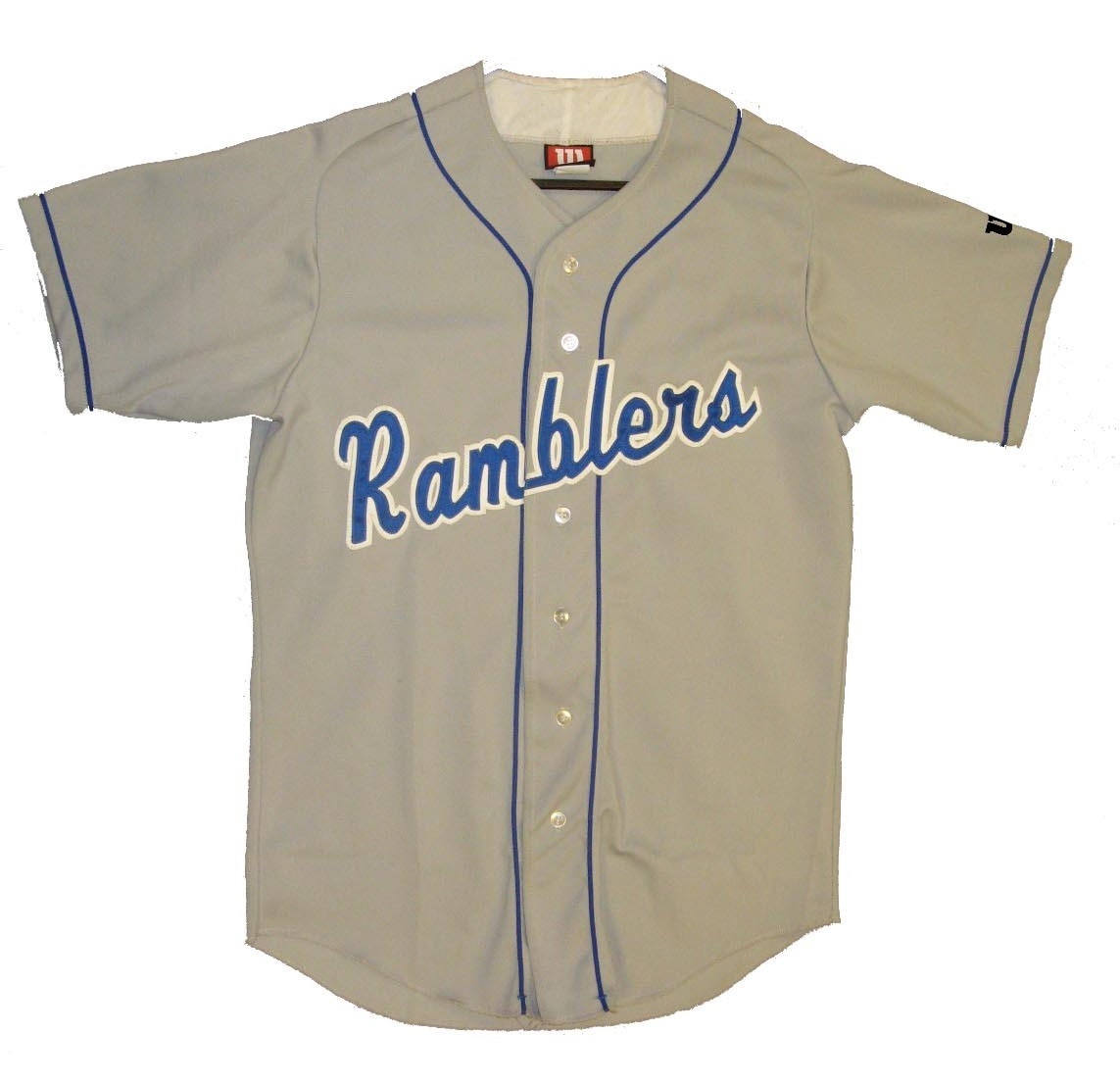
The Ramblers jersey, front view

One of the most recognizable traditions of the Midnight Ramblers is their unique performance garb, which consists of jeans, a T-shirt (occasionally matching, though this is not the case at most shows), and a grey baseball jersey featuring the word "Ramblers" on the front and the singer’s name and number on the back. In most cases, the singer’s last name is used, but certain members of the group have featured nicknames instead.

The jerseys are also regularly integrated into the Ramblers performances, being removed and repurposed as pants, blindfolds, hats, or, when twisted up and used like a whip, weapons. Wearing the jerseys in public has occasionally caused the Ramblers to be mistaken for members of a baseball team, rather than a vocal ensemble. Critics of the jerseys have pointed out their similarity to those worn by the LA Dodgers.

== Albums ==
The Ramblers made their recording debut with their 1999 release Now Playing. Since then, they have produced an additional twelve studio albums, including their most recent full-length CD, Déjà Blue. To commemorate their tenth anniversary in the Spring of 2008, the Ramblers re-released specific tracks from the seven previous albums on Anthology. All proceeds from sales of this disc were used to sponsor a new University of Rochester scholarship for incoming students with musical backgrounds.

=== Midnight Ramblers releases ===
- Now Playing (1999)
- E=MR^{2} (2000)
- All Sales Final (2001)
- Alternate Route (2003)
- the blue album (2004)
- Transistor Radio (2005)
- Midnight Ramblers: The DVD (2006)
- Manifesto! (2007)
- Anthology (2008)
- Ça C'est Bon (2009)
- CCB-Sides (2010)
- Revival (2011)
- Kiss You (Single) (2014)
- Déjà Blue (2015)
- 'Til It Happens To You (Single) (2017)
- This Side Up (2017)
- Things That You Say (2021)
- Don't Start Now (Single) (2022)

== Philanthropy ==
In recent years, the Ramblers have been pursuing increasing numbers of philanthropic projects. With help from their alumni and the UR office of admissions, the group now sponsors the Midnight Ramblers Scholarship, to be given for the first time to an incoming student from the class of 2013. Also, recordings of the Ramblers have been featured on Ripple Effect, a compilation album released by Liquid 5th Productions in Fall 2008 to fund drilling for wells that will provide water for impoverished African villages. Most recently, in March 2009 the Ramblers spent their spring tour in New Orleans, Louisiana where they sang entirely pro bono leading workshops and performances for students at schools stricken by Hurricane Katrina. In addition to their vocal work on the tour, they also worked to help with the reconstruction of a house in St. Bernard Parish.

== National exposure ==
The Ramblers have been featured on a number of a cappella compilation albums alongside other collegiate and professional groups, including two appearances on Best of College A cappella first in 2001 and again in 2008. In December 2008, they recorded their version of "Army" with Ben Folds for inclusion on his upcoming album Ben Folds Presents: University A Cappella! which consists entirely of a cappella covers of his music. Proceeds from the album go to benefit the Save the Music charity. To promote the album, the Ramblers appeared as the featured opening act at Folds performance at Rochester's Water Street Music Hall in March 2009.

=== Compilation album appearances ===
Year	Compilation	Track
2010	Voices Only	"Fireflies" from CCB-Sides
2010	Ripple Effect: Constructive Interference	"We All Need Saving" from Ça, C'est Bon
2009	Voices Only	"La Camisa Negra" from Ça, C'est Bon
2009	Ben Folds Presents: University A Cappella!	"Army" (specially recorded for this album)
2008	Ripple Effect: The First Drop	"La Camisa Negra" from Ça, C'est Bon
2008	Best of College A Cappella	"I Write Sins, Not Tragedies" from Manifesto!
2007	Voices Only	"Question!" from Manifesto!
2007	Sing IV	"The Minstrel's Prayer" from Manifesto!
2006	Sing III	"Question!" from Manifesto!
2001	Best of College A Cappella	"Truly, Madly, Deeply" from E=MR^{2}

=== Awards ===
Year	Presenter	Award	Result
2022	CASA: Contemporary A Cappella Recording Awards	"Best Funk / Disco Song" for "Don't Stop ‘Til You Get Enough"	Nominated
2022	CASA: Contemporary A Cappella Recording Awards	"Best R&B Song" for "Redbone"	Nominated
2022	CASA: Contemporary A Cappella Recording Awards	"Best Lower Voices Collegiate Album or EP" for "Things That You Say"	Won
2022	CASA: Contemporary A Cappella Recording Awards	"Best Lower Voices Collegiate Arrangement" for "Don't Stop ‘Til You Get Enough" (Ben Emmerich)	Won
2022	CASA: Contemporary A Cappella Recording Awards	"Best Lower Voices Collegiate Solo" for "Take on Me" (Cooper Orio)	Nominated
2022	CASA: Contemporary A Cappella Recording Awards	"Best Lower Voices Collegiate Song" for "Don't Stop ‘Til You Get Enough"	Won
2010	CASA: Contemporary A Cappella Recording Awards	"Best Male Collegiate Album" for "Ça C'est Bon"	Nominated
2010	CASA: Contemporary A Cappella Recording Awards	"Best Male Collegiate Song" for "Knights of Cydonia" from "Ça C'est Bon"	Nominated
2010	CASA: Contemporary A Cappella Recording Awards	"Best Male Collegiate Arrangement" for "Hallelujah" from "Ça C'est Bon" (Noah Berg)	Nominated
2009	University of Rochester	Outstanding Student Organization Student Life Award	Won
2008	CASA: Contemporary A Cappella Recording Awards	"Best Male Arrangement" for "3X5" from Manifesto! (Dave Soson and Dan Israel)	Nominated
2007	acaTunes.com	acaTunes Award for "Brighter Than Sunshine" from Manifesto!	Won
2006	University of Rochester	Award for Excellence in Creative Co-Sponsorship for "Jambalaya" Hurricane Relief Program	Won
2005	University of Rochester	The Boar's Head Award for Outstanding Contribution to the UR Community	Won
2005	International Championship of Collegiate A Cappella	National Finals	3rd Place
2005	International Championship of Collegiate A Cappella	Midatlantic Regional Finals	Won
2005	International Championship of Collegiate A Cappella	Midatlantic Divisional Round (RIT)	Won
