= Mosaic Whispers =

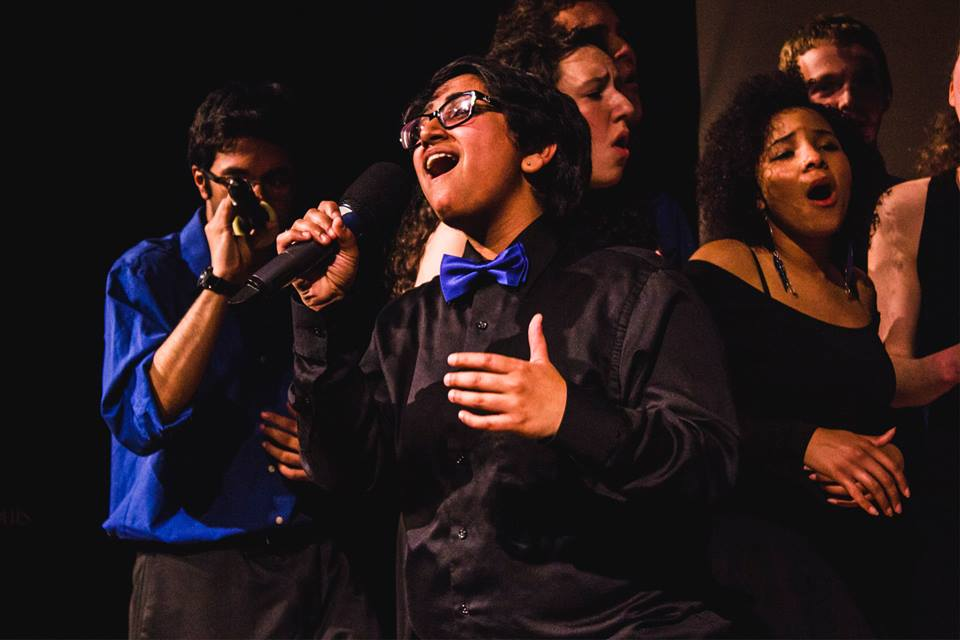
- The Mosaic Whispers' annual concert, Splash of Color

Background information
- Also known as: The Whispers, Washington University in St. Louis Mosaic Whispers
- Origin: St. Louis, Missouri, United States
- Genre: A Cappella
- Years active: 1991–present
- Label: Collegiate
- Website: Official website

Mosaic Whispers (also known as "The Whispers") is a Washington University all-gender a cappella group that performs music from a variety of genres. The group has performed on MSNBC's Hardball with Chris Matthews as well as on local radio stations such as 93.7 The Bull. The group competed in the international finals of the 2016 & 2025 ICCA competition. They have progressed to the national level of multiple ICCA competitions and the final four of a national competition to sing with Andy Grammer. They have toured nationally, opened for Ben Folds and Straight No Chaser, received a number of CARA nominations, and have been included on a number of national a cappella compilation albums.

== History ==
The Mosaic Whispers was founded in 1991 by a group of students and first performed together at Washington University's Thurtene Carnival. It is the oldest mixed-gender group at the university. The original roster included P. Daniel Newman, Jason Coryell, Brian Stephenson, Liz Radford, Josh Einsohn, Devorah Rosner, and Lora Norback, with the group holding auditions in the fall of 1991. Many alumni return and join current students at the group's annual spring concert, known as Splash of Color.

The group's music has been selected for several compilation a cappella albums, including appearances on BOCA, multiple Voices Only albums, and the 2008 Ben Folds Presents: University A Cappella!. The Whispers were selected after submitting a video of the group performing Folds' song "Still Fighting It" to Ben Folds' university a cappella competition.

One notable alumna is Eliotte Henderson ('10) who has toured internationally as a member of Taylor Swift's band.. Additionally, class of 2025 alumna Kitty (Kidist) Taye competed on Season 24 of American Idol, with the Whispers backing her up.

== International Championship of Collegiate A Cappella ==
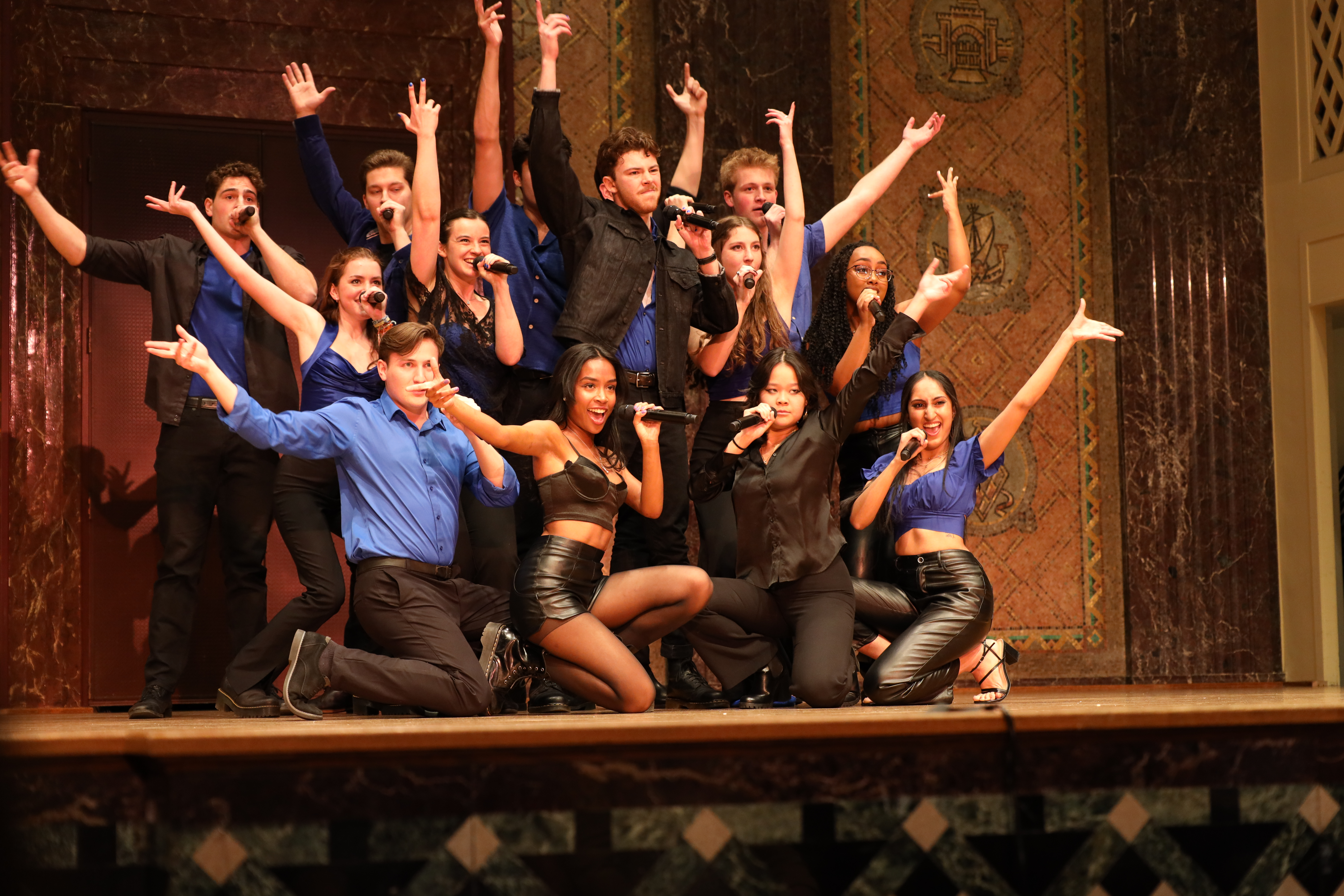
Senior William Skubish solos on Harry Styles' "Music for a Sushi Restaurant" at the 2023 Midwest Semifinal. Photo by William Urdahl.

The group regularly competes in the Varsity Vocals International Championship of Collegiate A Cappella (ICCA) and have advanced to Finals at New York City's Beacon Theater on multiple occasions, most recently in 2025. Whispers advanced after placing 1st in the Midwest Semifinal, where they performed a set consisting of Earth, Wind & Fire's "Getaway," "THE GREATEST" by Billie Eilish, and "Masterpiece (Mona Lisa)" by Jazmine Sullivan. Natalie Feldstein was named Outstanding Soloist for "THE GREATEST" and Camron Kaiser and Sophie Lyman were awarded Outstanding Arrangement for the entire set. Whispers have won each of the competition's 4 awards (Outstanding Soloist, Outstanding Vocal Percussion, Outstanding Choreography, and Outstanding Arrangement) multiple times and have won their Midwest Quarterfinals to advance to the Semifinals every year they have competed.

== Ben Folds Presents: University A Cappella! ==
The Mosaic Whispers were selected to be featured on the album after submitting a video of the group performing Folds' song "Still Fighting It" to Ben Folds' university a cappella competition. Reviews for their rendition of "Still Fighting It" were positive, with the Norwich Bulletin praising their performance.

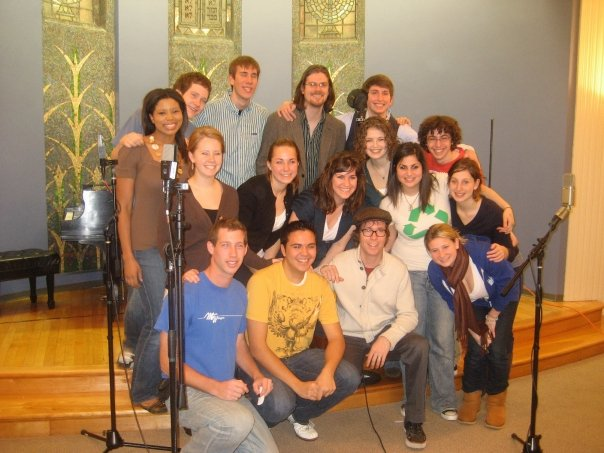
Mosaic Whispers and Ben Folds take a break from recording "Still Fighting It" for Ben Folds Presents: University A Cappella!

== Andy Grammer Competition ==
In Spring 2012, The Whispers reached the final four in a competition to sing with Andy Grammer. The competition, which was 12 days long, consisted of submitting three performance videos, including two Andy Grammer songs. The Whispers arranged and learned the song Fine By Me in 8 hours for their final video submission. To gain votes, the Whispers got support of both the WashU newspaper Studlife and the St. Louis Metro social media staff. While they won the popular vote (consisting of Facebook Likes, Tweets, and user account votes) in their final round, they ultimately lost to the professional a cappella group Six Appeal, who garnered the votes of both TopBlip and Grammer himself.

== Notable performances ==
In Spring 2012, the Whispers sang "Change the World" for Bill Nye and Washington University's board of trustees, as a part of the dedication to WUSTL's new Earth, Planetary, and Space Science Center.

The Whispers sang for the launch of Washington University's Leading Together Campaign, a multibillion-dollar fundraiser to aid the expanding university. They also sang to help the Boatload of Toys fundraiser, a charity event for St. Louis children hosted by 93.7 St. Louis, with Mason and Remy. They have also sung for the WUSTL Founder's Day ball on multiple occasions, which has been attended by Robert Gates, John Huntsman, and Anderson Cooper.

== Albums ==
- Watercolors (1994)
  - I Can't Make You Love Me (track 3) has been reviewed as "a sharply performed, smartly arranged, and emotionally stirring number that made substantial improvements on the original recording."
- Three A.M. And Nowhere To Go (1996)
  - Spin the Bottle (track 11) has been praised as having "Great solos. Great blend. Crystal clear arrangements. Bright and spirited performances."
- Don't Tell My Parents (1998)
- Throw Your Pennies At Someone Else (2000)
- Vested Interest (2000)
- Against the Grain (2000)
- Defrosted (2004)
- Behind Bars (2007)
  - Fix You (the final track) has been reviewed as "a perfect end to a very good album."
- Page 9 (2011)
  - Die Alone's (track 7) soloist Ilana Schwartz has been praised as "a specialty", with a uniquely good voice for an Ingrid Michaelson cover
- Wavelength (2015)
- ICCA 2016: The Extended Cuts - EP (2017)
- Oasis (2018)
  - Retrograde (track 9) and White Flag (track 2) were selected as Recorded A Cappella Review Board Tracks of the Year.
- Paint the Sky EP (2026)
- DREAMWORLD (2026)
