= University of California Men's Octet =

University of California a cappella vocal group

UC Men's Octet
- Choir
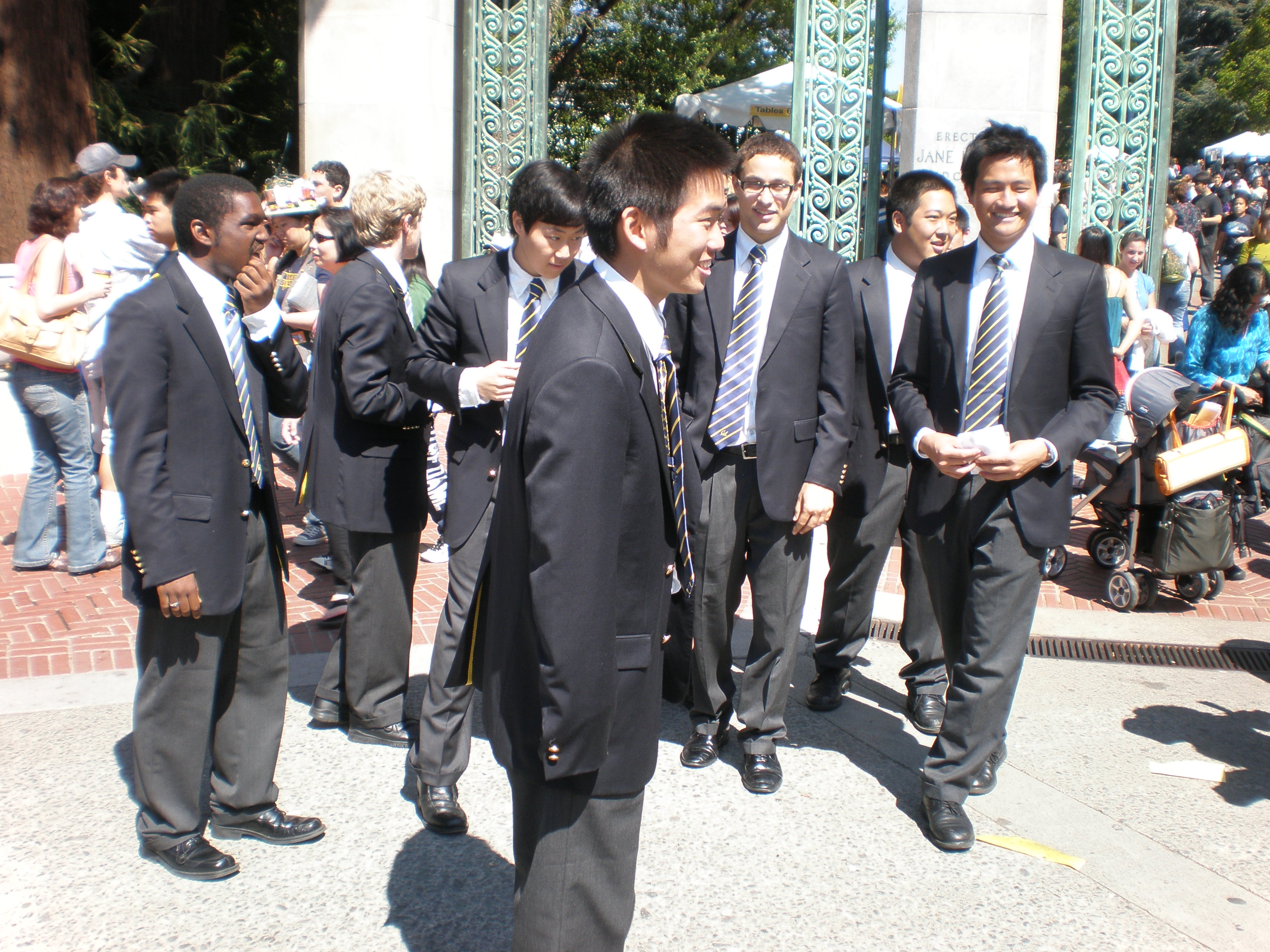
- The Men's Octet after performing in front of Sather Gate during Cal Day 2009
- Also known as: Cal Men’s Octet; UC Berkeley Men’s Octet
- Origin: University of California, Berkeley
- Founded: 1948
- Genre: A cappella
- Choirmaster: Ron Yaldin
- Headquarters: Cesar Chavez Student Center
- Affiliation: UC Choral Ensembles
- Awards: International Championship of Collegiate A Cappella, 1998 and 2000
- Website: Official website

The UC Men's Octet, sometimes termed the Cal Men’s Octet or the UC Berkeley Men’s Octet, is an eight-member male a cappella group at the University of California, Berkeley. Founded in 1948 as a member of the UC Choral Ensembles, the group's broad repertoire features several genres of music including barbershop, doo-wop, pop and alternative, and a healthy dose of Berkeley fight songs. The Octet has recorded over a dozen albums and is one of only four multiple-time champions of the International Championship of Collegiate A Cappella (ICCA)—the other three being USC's SoCal VoCals, Berklee's Pitch Slapped, and Belmont’s Pitchmen—having won the competition in both 1998 and 2000.

While the Octet performs regularly around the San Francisco Bay Area for both alumni and the public, the group has toured all around the world including China, Australia, Europe and extensively throughout the United States. They also perform for Cal students every Wednesday during the academic year at one o’clock on Berkeley's Sproul Plaza.

The group hosts a series of annual concerts. In the Fall, there is the West Coast A Cappella Showcase, where several groups from all over the country are invited to perform at Berkeley. Past guest groups in this concert have included former ICCA Champions Brigham Young University's Noteworthy and Vocal Point as well as groups from Stanford, UCLA, USC, Mt. San Antonio College, and the University of Oregon. The group's other annual concert performances include the UC Men’s Octet Spring Show and the year-end Unbuttoned Show.

== Discography ==
The UC Men's Octet has recorded over a dozen albums. Among them:

- The University of California Men’s Octet (1980 LP)
- Octa-Brew (1982 LP)
- Eight Times the Fun (1985 LP)
- Around the World in 8 Days (1986 cassette)
- 1948-1988 (1988 cassette)
- Better Eight Than Never (1989 cassette)
- Takin' the Joke too Far (1991 cassette)
- Eight is Enough (1993 CD and cassette)
- All Sing Blue And Gold (1994 cassette) (all Cal songs)
- We 8 Too Much (1994 cassette)
- Octogen (1996 CD)
- Eight Misbehavin' (1997 CD)
- Gold (2000 CD)
- Octopella (2004 CD)
- High Octane (2008 CD)

== Honors and awards ==
- 1998. International Championship of Collegiate A Cappella (ICCA) Champions
- 2000. International Championship of Collegiate A Cappella (ICCA) Champions

== The Octet in the media ==
Over the years, the Men's Octet has been cited in several California Bay Area publications such as The Daily Review, the San Jose Mercury News, and the Contra Costa Times. The Men's Octet has also made several appearances in other media. From annual appearances on the San Francisco/San Jose radio station KFOG to appearing on the WCAU News in Philadelphia, the Men's Octet have been heard nationwide.

The Octet has even recorded a public health service announcement with the California Department of Health Services entitled “Wash Your Hands” as part of the Immunization Branch's campaign against the spread of the flu. The group also recorded a nationally aired radio commercial for Coors beer to promote "The Pigskin Can".

== See also ==
- California Golden Overtones
- University of California Marching Band
