= Ben Folds Presents: University A Cappella! =

2009 album produced by Ben Folds

Studio album by Various
- Released: April 28, 2009
- Genre: A cappella
- Length: 69:22
- Label: Sony
- Producer: Ben Folds

Various chronology
Stems and Seeds (2009)	''Ben Folds Presents: University A Cappella!'' (2009)	Lonely Avenue (2010)

Professional ratings
Aggregate scores
Source	Rating
Metacritic	67/100
Review scores
Source	Rating
Allmusic	3/5 stars
The A.V. Club	B−
The Boston Globe	positive
Melodic.net	2/5 stars
Paste	9.1/10
PopMatters	6/10 stars
Prefix Magazine	5.0/10

Ben Folds Presents: University A Cappella! is an album produced by Ben Folds featuring collegiate a cappella music groups from the United States performing new arrangement of songs Folds originally wrote on piano for a rock band context. Folds became interested in a cappella music after hearing his song "Brick" performed by an Ohio University group.

== Track listing ==
1. "Not the Same" – The Spartones from The University of North Carolina at Greensboro – 4:11
2. "Jesusland" – The University of North Carolina at Chapel Hill's Loreleis – 4:20
3. "Brick" – The Ohio University Leading Tones – 4:02
4. "You Don't Know Me" – The University of Georgia's With Someone Else's Money – 3:08
5. "Still Fighting It" – The Washington University in St. Louis' Mosaic Whispers – 4:32
6. "Boxing" – Ben Folds – 4:23
7. "Selfless, Cold and Composed" – The Sacramento State Jazz Singers – 6:25
8. "Magic" – The University of Chicago's Voices in Your Head – 5:09
9. "Landed" – The University of Colorado Buffoons – 4:11
10. "Time" – The Princeton Nassoons – 4:03
11. "Effington" – Ben Folds, Gracie Folds, Louis Folds – 3:27
12. "Evaporated" – The Newtones from Newton, Massachusetts – 5:27
13. "Fred Jones Part 2" – The West Chester University of Pennsylvania Gracenotes – 3:43
14. "Army" – The University of Rochester Midnight Ramblers – 3:12
15. "Fair" – The University of Wisconsin-Eau Claire Fifth Element – 4:24
16. "The Luckiest" – The Washington University in St. Louis' The Amateurs – 4:50
