= California Golden Overtones =

Female a cappella group

Founded in the 1962, the California Golden Overtones (since 1984), previously the deciBelles (1970s), sometimes called the Golden Overtones or the Tones, is a six to thirteen-member female a cappella group at the University of California, Berkeley. The group's prolific repertoire spans many genres of music and grows each year with new arrangements and contributions of past and popular songs. From rap to doo-wop to country, the group embraces all styles and interprets them into a strong female sound.

The Overtones have recorded multiple albums, most recently Out of Line (2020). In 2001 the group placed second in the International Championship of Collegiate A Cappella (ICCA). The Overtones were also named as one of "The 10 Female Groups Running the A Cappella World" by College Magazine in 2016. In 2019, the group was mentioned in a College Aca article for their rendition of The National Manthem by Little Mix.

The Overtones perform regularly around the Bay Area for both alumni and the community. They also perform for Cal students each Friday of the academic year at one o’clock. They can be found next to the historic Sather Gate on Berkeley's Sproul Plaza.

The group hosts a series of annual concerts. In the Fall, the West Coast A Cappella Showcase features invited groups from all over the country. Past guest groups in this concert have included former ICCA Champions Brigham Young University’s Noteworthy and Vocal Point and Colorado's In the Buff. Other California guests include groups from Stanford, UCLA, USC, Mount San Antonio College, and the University of Oregon. The Overtones also perform in annual concert performances including the Overtones Spring Show, and make regular guest appearances at the UC Men's Octet Spring Show.

Their YouTube channel has an extensive list of previous performances, spanning back to 2008.

== Discography ==
- California Street, 1988
- Bar Nine, 1990
- Ridin' the Wave, 1993
- Pipe Dreams, 1995
- Bear All, 2000
- No Boys Allowed, 2002
- Out of Line, 2020
