= SoCal VoCals =

The SoCal VoCals
- Origin: Los Angeles, California, U.S.
- Genres: A cappella
- Years active: 1995-present
- Website: www.scvocals.com

The SoCal VoCals are the first of nine a cappella groups from the University of Southern California. Founded in 1996, the group's signature achievement is being the only a cappella group to win five titles in ICCA, which it accomplished in 2008, 2010, 2012, 2015, and 2018. In 2020, the A Cappella Archive ranked the SoCal VoCals at #1 out of all ICCA-competing groups.

The group comprises between 13 and 19 male and female students who arrange and sing songs from multiple genres, including pop, rock, and jazz. The group has released seven albums and have performed in venues including the Staples Center, Walt Disney Concert Hall, the Rose Bowl, the Los Angeles House of Blues, the Hollywood Bowl, Carnegie Hall and the Getty Center.

The SoCal VoCals are known for their energetic performance style and school spirit; they are the only USC a cappella group to perform a rendition of the university's Alma Mater.

== History ==
In April 2008, the SoCal VoCals took first place in the ICCAs at New York City's Lincoln Center, winning the title "Grand Champions". The next morning, they were featured on The Today Show.

In April 2010, the SoCal VoCals returned to Lincoln Center and reclaimed the ICCA title, making them one of only two groups to win that title more than once.

On April 29, 2012, the SoCal VoCals performed in competition at The Town Hall (New York City). They won their third ICCA title and became the first to have won the title by winning the Wildcard round.

On April 18, 2015, the SoCal VoCals competed at the Beacon Theatre (New York City) to win for the fourth time, claiming the newly minted trophy and adding to their already-unchallenged record of victories..

On April 21, 2018, the SoCal Vocals returned to the Beacon Theatre (New York City) to win ICCA for the fifth time. The SoCal VoCals are the first group to ever win ICCA five times.

In September 2018, the SoCal VoCals took home second place at the A Cappella Open at Carnegie Hall in New York City.

On April 29, 2023, the SoCal VoCals returned to ICCA, performing at The Town Hall (New York City) and placing second.

=== Notable spinoffs ===
In November 2009, one current member of the USC SoCal VoCals joined with seven VoCals alumni to compete as "the SoCals" on NBC's first a cappella competition, The Sing-Off.

In 2010, five current and former members of the VoCals competed in Season 2 of The Sing-Off as members of the Backbeats.

In 2011, Scott Hoying, a member of the SoCal VoCals, led a team of five people to win NBC's third season of The Sing-Off as Pentatonix.

In 2013, VoCal alumni Emily Goglia competed on The Sing-Off as one of two leaders for the group Element.

In 2013, SoCal VoCals members Kenton Chen, Rachel Saltzman, Ben Bram, and Allie Feder joined with other Sing-Off alumni to form an a cappella group called Level. They have since performed on The Late Late Show with James Corden. Another SoCal VoCals alum, Gabriel Leung, joined them on occasion.

In 2014, SoCal VoCals alumnus Ben Bram co-founded A Cappella Academy along with fellow Sing-Off arranger Rob Dietz and former Pentatonix bass vocalist, Avi Kaplan. The camp has produced many of the nation's top a cappella singers.

In 2018, SoCal VoCals then-current member Elizabeth Gaba placed in the top 24 for American Idol.

In 2018, SoCal VoCals members Kaylah Baker and Nina Nelson left the group to be a part of the all-female a cappella group, Citizen Queen.

In 2019, tenor Jej Vinson reached the top 16 on NBC's The Voice and his blind audition of "Passionfruit" has amassed almost 10 million views on YouTube as of March 2020.

In 2020, SoCal VoCals alumna Tehillah Alphonso received a GRAMMY nomination for Best Arrangement, Instruments and Vocals.

In 2023, SoCal VoCals alumni Izzy Kaye, JEJ Vinson, and Tabon Ward aired on NBC's The Voice S23 as vocal trio Sheer Element, where they joined Kelly Clarkson's team.

== Notable alumni ==
- Ross Golan
- Scott Hoying
- Ben Bram
- Nina Ann Nelson, member of Citizen Queen
- Kaylah Sharve, member of Citizen Queen
- Audra Levi aka Audra Lee
- James Snyder
- Rachel Bearer, member of ARORA
- Kelley Jakle
- Juliette Goglia
- Catherine Ricafort

== Discography ==
=== Albums ===
- This Ain't No Choir, Babe (1997)
- This 2 Shall Rock (1999)
- V3: Previously Unreleased (2001)
- The SoCal VoCals (2004)
- Get In. ROCK. Get Out. (2006)
- Unanimous (2009)
- Permit to Harmonize (2013)
- VoCabulary (2016)

=== Extended plays ===
- 2010 ICCA Set EP
- V (2018 ICCA Set EP)
