= International Championship of Collegiate A Cappella =

Annual singing competition

The International Championship of Collegiate A Cappella (ICCA), originally the National Championship of Collegiate A Cappella (NCCA, a play on NCAA), is an international competition run by Varsity Vocals, that attracts hundreds of college a cappella groups each year.

The competition sees groups from the United States, Canada, and the United Kingdom compete across 9 regions, culminating in the ICCA Finals in New York City. A small number of groups from Ireland, South Africa, and Mexico have participated sporadically as well.

== History ==
Founded in 1996 by former Tufts University Beelzebubs music director Deke Sharon and former Brown University Derbies member Adam Farb, the ICCA tournament takes place from January through April in nine regions: West, Southwest, Midwest, Great Lakes, Central, Mid-Atlantic, Northeast, South, and United Kingdom.

The ICCA has been presented by Varsity Vocals since 1999, when the competition was purchased by Don Gooding (Contemporary A Cappella Publishing). The success of the ICCA produced two spin-off competitions: the International Championship of High School A Cappella (ICHSA), starting in 2005; and the International Championship of A Cappella Open (The Open), starting in 2017. Amanda Newman became owner of Varsity Vocals in 2008 and has since produced the events.

The 2006–2007 competition season was a focus of the book Pitch Perfect: The Quest for Collegiate A Cappella Glory, which followed three groups vying to win the Championship. The book later became the basis for the Pitch Perfect film series, the first of which featured the protagonists competing in the ICCA.

The ICCA was also featured in the reality TV series Sing It On, which aired for two seasons (2015–2016) on POP TV. The series, which was executive produced by singer John Legend, premiered on May 13, 2015 and over the course of sixteen episodes followed groups such as the Nor'easters from Northeastern University, All-Night Yahtzee from Florida State University, Faux Paz from the University of Maryland, and S#arp Attitude from the University of Massachusetts as they advanced through the competition.

=== Abnormalities ===
==== 1999 ====
The 1999 National Championship of Collegiate A Cappella tournament was never held due to financial difficulties. It was resumed in 2000 and renamed the International Championship of Collegiate A Cappella after its purchase by Don Gooding.

==== 2020 ====
The 2020 ICCA tournament was cut short in March due to the COVID-19 pandemic. One quarterfinal, seven semifinals, the wild card round, and the 2020 ICCA Finals were cancelled.

==== 2021 ====
The 2021 ICCA tournament was held entirely virtually to compensate for COVID-19 safety guidelines. Groups participating in the competition were expected to submit homemade videos to be judged. It was the first time the entire tournament was free to watch.

== Guidelines ==
There are four or five quarterfinal events held in each of the eight American regions (Central, Great Lakes, Mid-Atlantic, Midwest, Northeast, South, Southwest, West), while the United Kingdom region holds four. Generally, the top two college groups at each quarterfinal advance to the semifinals in their respective regions. The winner of each semifinal is invited to participate in finals, currently held at The Town Hall in New York City, (the event has also been held in Lincoln Center for the Performing Arts, Carnegie Hall, PlayStation Theatre, and the Beacon Theatre), where they compete for coveted title of International Champion.

Each group prepares a short 10 minute performance (usually three songs) that best show the group's strengths. Originally, the time limit was 12 minutes, but due to time constraints and vocal strain, the time was shortened. Primary focus is on a group's musical performance, but presentation and choreography are scored as well. Groups generally range in size from 8-20. A panel of three to five trained judges evaluates the group's performance.

=== Vocal performance ===
According to official Varsity Vocals documents, the aspects of vocal performance that are integral to a high-scoring ICCA performance include balance and blend, quality and inventiveness of arrangement, rhythmic accuracy, interpretation of song, intonation, solo interpretation, tone quality, dynamic precision, and diction. The first six of these concepts are graded on a 1-10 scale, while the last three are graded on a 1-5 scale. These numbers are added up, then added to the number for the next section, Visual Performance. The total possible score for this section is 75.

=== Visual performance ===
Visual performance is, while not as highly weighted as vocal performance, still an integral aspect of any ICCA performance. The various aspects of visual performance include visual cohesiveness, effectiveness of presentation, energy/stage presence, appropriateness of movement, creativity of movement, transitioning/blocking, and professionalism. The first three categories are graded on a 1-10 scale, while the last four are graded on a 1-5 scale. The purpose of visual presentation is to present, not unlike a show choir, the emotiveness of a performance through body movement. While oftentimes a group may value Vocal Performance over Visual Performance, high marks and Semifinal award-winning performances have relied equally on the strength of their movement with that of their sound.

=== Subjective ranking ===
Finally, another crucial aspect of the performance grade comes in the form of a ranking box. If a judge decides that your group merits 1st, 2nd, or 3rd place in the overall competition, they circle one of these choices, which comes to correspond with an additive point value. So, if a judge decides you are the 1st place group, another 30 points are added to that individual judge's overall score. If they decide you are 2nd, you receive an additional 20 points, and if they decide you are 3rd, you receive an additional 10 points. These go towards the eventual rankings at the end of the night's performance, when the judges announce the first-place winner, the runner up, and the second runner up.

Occasionally the event has caught the attention of national media. The greatest television exposure was three successive performances on The Today Show in 2001, culminating with a Monday morning performance by the champions, the University of Michigan Compulsive Lyres. The following year, competitors the Skidmore Dynamics were the subject of a New York Times article a few days before they took the stage at Lincoln Center.

Following their first ICCA win, and appearance on The Today Show in 2008, the SoCal VoCals were featured in an article in Newsweek.

== In fiction ==
Various ensembles compete for the ICCA national title in the comedy Pitch Perfect, while a fictionalized World Championship competition is portrayed in the 2015 sequel.

== Previous champions ==
Year	Institution	Group	Region
2026	Northeastern University	The Nor'easters	Northeast
2025	Belmont University	Pitchmen	South
2024	Utah Valley University	Bloom	Southwest
2023	Belmont University	Pitchmen	South
2022	University of Wisconsin, Madison	Pitches & Notes	Great Lakes
2021	University of Maryland, College Park	Faux Paz	Mid-Atlantic (WC)
2020	(year's championship cancelled due to the COVID-19 pandemic)		
2019	New York University	N'Harmonics	Northeast
2018	University of Southern California	SoCal VoCals	West
2017	Northeastern University	The Nor'easters	Northeast
2016	Imperial College London	The Techtonics	United Kingdom
2015	University of Southern California	SoCal VoCals	West
2014	Berklee College of Music	Pitch Slapped	Northeast
2013	Northeastern University	The Nor'easters	Northeast
2012	University of Southern California	SoCal VoCals	West (WC)
2011	Berklee College of Music	Pitch Slapped	Northeast
2010	University of Southern California	SoCal VoCals	West
2009	Mt. San Antonio College	Fermata Nowhere	West
2008	University of Southern California	SoCal VoCals	West
2007	Brigham Young University	Noteworthy	West
2006	Brigham Young University	Vocal Point	West
2005	Boston University	Dear Abbeys	Northeast
2004	Millikin University	OneVoice	Midwest
2003	Binghamton University	Binghamton Crosbys	New England
2002	University of Michigan	Compulsive Lyres	Midwest
2001	Millikin University	Chapter 6	Midwest
2000	University of California, Berkeley	UC Men's Octet	West
1999	(no national champion)		
1998	University of California, Berkeley	UC Men's Octet	West
1997	Stanford University	Talisman A Cappella	West
1996	University of North Carolina	Loreleis	South

- (WC) – The 2012 and 2021 champions, The SoCal VoCals and Faux Paz, respectively, qualified for finals through the wild card round after placing 2nd at regional semifinals
