= Wide Awake (Parachute album) =

Studio album by Parachute
- Released: March 11, 2016
- Genre: Pop rock
- Length: 47:20
- Label: Vanguard Records
- Producer: John Fields

Parachute chronology
Overnight (2013)	Wide Awake (2016)	Parachute (2019)

Singles from Wide Awake
- 1. "Without You" Released: January 15th, 2016; 2. "What Side of Love" Released: February 12th, 2016

Professional ratings
Review scores
Source	Rating
Alternative Addiction	4/5 stars
AllMusic	3/5 stars
Melodic	3/5 stars

Wide Awake is the fourth full-length studio album by American pop rock band Parachute. It was released on March 11, 2016 by Vanguard Records. It contains 12 tracks, all except one produced by John Fields. The band had collaborated with Fields previously on their first two albums, Losing Sleep (2009) and The Way It Was (2011). On the day of its release, Wide Awake charted #1 for U.S. Pop Albums on iTunes. The album debuted at No. 48 on the Billboard 200 and at No. 9 on Billboard's Digital Albums chart.

== Singles ==
On May 12, 2015, a little less than a year before the album’s release, the band released a song from the record, “Crave,” produced by Matt Rad. The first official single, titled “Without You,” was released exclusively on Billboard's website on January 14, 2016. It was then released to iTunes and Spotify the following day, January 15, 2016. The track currently has over 3 million plays on Spotify. The album's second single, titled “What Side of Love,” was first released on Yahoo's website on February 11, 2016, and was then released to iTunes and other platforms the following day. An acoustic version of “What Side of Love” has since also been released on Spotify, YouTube, iTunes, and Apple music.

== Music videos ==
The official lyric video for “Without You” was released on June 21, 2016, to YouTube and Vevo. The video features hundreds of Parachute fans, each holding up a different word or phrase from the song along to the music, and currently has over 150,000 views. There has yet to be an official music video for "What Side of Love."

== Charts ==
Chart (2016)	Peak position
U.S. Billboard 200	48
U.S. Digital Albums (Billboard)	9

== Track listing ==
No.	Title	Writer(s)	Length
1.	"Without You"	Will Anderson	3:48
2.	"What Side of Love"	Anderson, James Flannigan, Sean Douglas	3:46
3.	"Jennie"	Anderson	4:31
4.	"Everything"	Anderson, Dave Barnes	4:00
5.	"Lonely With Me"	Anderson, Nathan Chapman	3:39
6.	"Love Me Anyway"	Anderson	3:24
7.	"New Orleans"	Anderson	4:06
8.	"When You Move"	Anderson, Courtney Kampa	4:01
9.	"Getaway"	Anderson	4:46
10.	"Crave"	Anderson, Gabe Dixon, Jamie Hartman	2:45
11.	"What Breaks My Heart"	Anderson	4:33
12.	"Waking Up"	Anderson	4:09

== Personnel ==
- John Fields - guitar, bass, keyboards, programming
- Will Anderson - lead vocals, guitar, piano, bass
- Johnny Stubblefield - vocals, drums, percussion
- Kit French - vocals, saxophone, keyboards, harmonica
- Ken Chastain - percussion, programming on "Getaway," "Lonely With Me," "What Side of Love," and "Without You"
- Stephen Lu - violin, viola, cello and string arrangements on "Everything" and "What Breaks My Heart"
- Katelyn Tarver - background vocals on "When You Move"
- Angela Fisher, Keith Allen, Jason Morales and Bridgette Bryant - background vocals on "Without You," "Lonely With Me," "What Side of Love," and "New Orleans"
- Michael Reaves - additional production on "Love Me Anyway" and "What Side of Love"
- Jay Barclay - electric guitar on "Love Me Anyway"
- Ilya Toshinskiy - acoustic guitar on "When You Move"
- Ben Burget - trumpet on "Without You" and "Lonely With Me"
- Matt Rad - keyboards, percussion, background vocals on "Crave"
- Curt Schneider - bass on "Crave"
- Ruth Cunningham - background vocals on "Crave"
- Sean Douglas, Steve Greenberg, and Jimmy Coup - additional production on "What Side of Love"
