= Events Held on The Lawn at UVA =

University of Virginia programs

The Lawn is a historical and central location on the grounds of the University of Virginia (UVA). Each school year, there are a number of events held on the Lawn to build a sense of community among the students, faculty, and the community in Charlottesville as a whole. Listed are events that have become traditions carried out by the university itself and the students.

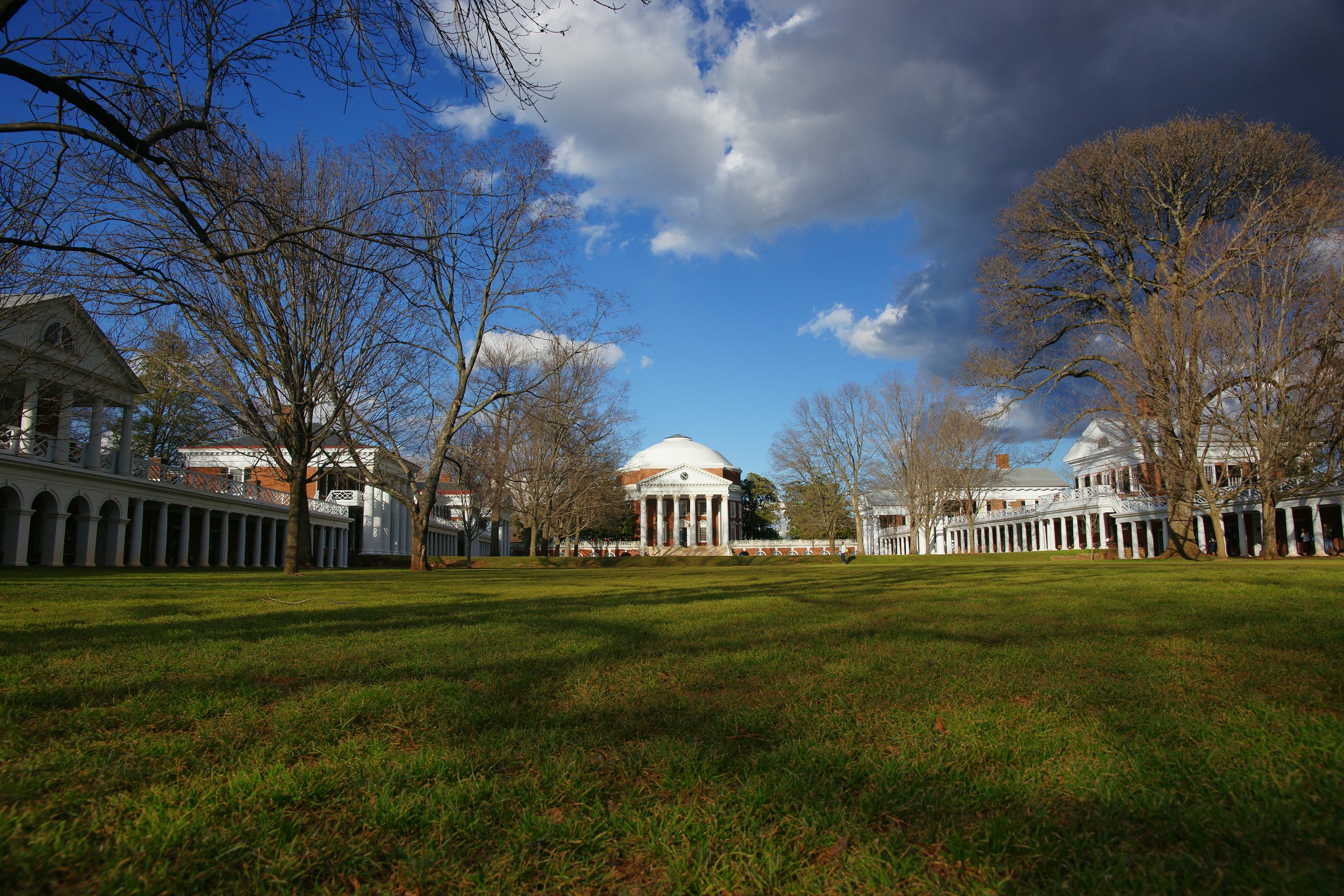
The Lawn is lined by 54 Lawn rooms and at the north stands the Rotunda (shown) and the Lawn is ended in the south by Old Cabell Hall and a statue of Homer. The upper Lawn by the Rotunda is where most of the events listed are held.

== First Year Convocation ==
Convocation is the only time other than Final Exercises that the entire first year class is together in one place. It is also the first major event on Grounds for the students after they are officially moved into their first year dorms. The students are welcomed to the University of Virginia by the President, the Student Council President, and the chair of the Honor Committee. The speakers stand on the Rotunda steps and the students face the Rotunda to symbolize their "entrance into the University community". At convocation, the students are taught what it means to be a student at a school with an Honor System, and it is enforced just how prominent the tradition is in the university's community. The students exit the convocation by signing the honor pledge for their first time as a student at UVA.

== Rotunda Sing ==
At the beginning of each school year, the University of Virginia hosts a Rotunda Sing for all of the students. Rotunda Sing is considered to be the big kickoff event for the fall semester. The event includes over a dozen a cappella groups performing any genre of their choosing. The oldest a cappella group at the university, The Virginia Gentlemen, perform, as well as the oldest all-female group, The Virginia Belles, and the Hullabahoos, who performed in the film Pitch Perfect. During the event, the groups also take the time to advertise when and where their auditions will be held for the upcoming academic year.

== Trick-or-Treating on the Lawn ==
The students living on the Lawn open up their doors to children of the community for trick or treating on Halloween each year. Students started the tradition in the 1980s. Families and children align the 54 rooms surrounding the Lawn while the Lawn residents and other students stand outside each room and give candy to the children. The event usually has a turn out of hundreds of children trick-or-treating and many organizations donate candy to help out the Lawn residents for the event.

== Lighting of the Lawn ==
Lighting of the Lawn concludes the fall semester and is hosted by the University of Virginia and the Fourth-Year Trustees to get the students, faculty, and community ready for the Holiday Season. The tradition began in 2001 after the terrorist attack on September 11. The Fourth-Year Council wanted to bring together the community and students to raise money for the Wounded Warrior Project and to reflect on the horrors of that day. Today, the goal of the event is "to reflect on friendships amongst us at present, a time to inspire hope through one another and a time to celebrate the wonderful community which we call home," which was stated on the Lighting of the Lawn website for the 2013 celebration. The trustees still raises money at the event and all of the proceeds go to the Wounded Warrior Project. Lighting of the Lawn includes performances from about 20 a cappella groups, the reading of the Fourth-Year poem from a guest speaker, and concludes with the lighting of the Rotunda and the Academic Village as a whole. The poem is written by Trustees of the events throughout the semester and is usually humorous for the crowd's enjoyment. After the much anticipated light show on the Rotunda, the lights are lit around the Academic Village and are lit every night until early January.

== Final Exercises ==
Final Exercises are held each May for both undergraduates and graduates graduating from the university. The graduating students now face the opposite way than for First Year Convocation and they face Old Cabell Hall to symbolize their leaving of the University of Virginia and their entering into the world and their future careers. The Final Exercises take up the entirety of the Lawn so the students get one final walk down the Lawn. The students start their walk down the stairs of the Rotunda and carry balloons as they take their final walk as a student at the university. The students usually hold their balloons until after the president congratulates the class and then the balloons are released in celebration. After the walk down the Lawn and some guest speakers, the students split off to different sections of Grounds to receive their diplomas from their designated department.
