= The Virginia Belles =

American all-female a cappella group

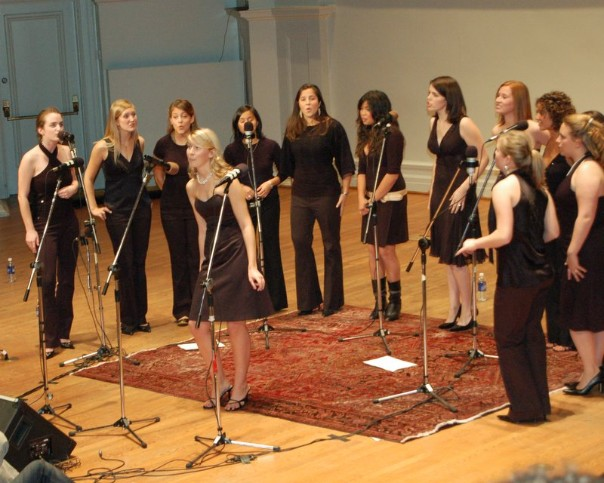
- The Belles performing at The Virginia Gentlemen's Family Weekend Concert

Background information
- Also known as: The Belles
- Origin: University of Virginia
- Genres: A Cappella
- Years active: 1977–present
- Labels: A Cappella Records
- Members: Class of 2024; Anna Holtschlag; Mikaela Gustitus; Claire Wright Class of 2025; Olivia Conniff; Eugenie Davis; Madigan Lounsbery; Gennese Springs Class of 2026; Sanjana Jaiswal; Simone Marijic; Cate Mangione; Yukta Ramanan; Kirby Westerfield Class of 2027; Megan Myers; Layla Ahmed; Sonia Mistry; Katrin Bergesen

The Virginia Belles is the University of Virginia's oldest all-female a cappella group based in Charlottesville, Virginia. The group was established in 1977 by Katherine Mitchell as the female counterpart to the Virginia Gentlemen, the university's oldest a cappella group. Completely student-run, the Belles continue to perform an eclectic range of vocal music from oldies and classic rock to indie and R&B. They sing in and around Charlottesville, and up and down the East Coast and all across the U.S. (often wearing little black dresses), and have received awards and honors from internationally acclaimed organizations such as the Contemporary A Cappella Society, Varsity Vocals, and the Recorded A Cappella Review Board.

== History ==
The Belles were founded in the fall of 1977 by Katherine Mitchell, a student at the University of Virginia. A woman who continues to love music, Katherine noticed then that there was no outlet for female a cappella at the university. The Virginia Gentlemen, the university's oldest all-male a cappella group had been established since 1953, so Katherine formed The Virginia Belles as the female counterpart to the Virginia Gentlemen. Initially the Belles were a select part of the Virginia Women's Chorus. The most talented members of the Women's Chorus were asked to audition for the Belles, singing both madrigal and popular music. Today, the Belles hold auditions every semester for every female-identifying student at the university to attend.

== The Belles Today ==
The Belles today are a Contracted Independent Organization run through UVA's student council and are no longer a part of the Women's Chorus. The group is entirely student-run and affiliated with the UVA McIntire Department of Music. The Belles sing for almost every type of occasion, be it fundraising events on Grounds, private parties, weddings, sports events, concerts, or business meetings. At the end of 2024, the Belles were even invited to perform for the U.S. Senate. The Belles are known for wearing their signature "little black dresses" to perform around the country.

The Belles are currently signed with A Cappella Records, an all-digital record label for a cappella music. Their music can be purchased on iTunes and Amazon.com or streamed on platforms such as Spotify and Apple Music.

=== Fall Roll ===
The Belles tour the East Coast every year on a trip they call "Fall Roll," visiting numerous other schools, colleges, and universities. Past trips have included visits with the Princeton Footnotes, Vanderbilt Melodores, The Baker's Dozen of Yale University, Cornell Men of Last Call, William and Mary's The Gentlemen of the College, Virginia Tech Juxtaposition, The UNC Achordants, etc. The University of Virginia's Fall Break is always reserved for this excursion.

=== CD Production/Album Recording ===
The Belles originally recorded and released a new CD biyearly. They have released numerous CDs throughout the years, garnering praise and national acclaim from fans and the a cappella community. Their repertoire today continues to be an eclectic mix of all different genres of music. In the present day, The Virginia Belles release a new EP every fall (usually coinciding with the night of their fall concert) which contains highlights from their past year's repertoire.

Up until 2007, the group spent their recording career with accomplished sound engineers Paul Brier and Chris Doermann, formerly of Virginia Arts Recording in Charlottesville, VA. However, with the release of Taking Every Detour, the group switched the production studios of both Brier and UVA alum James Gammon with James Gammon Productions. With their album acaBELLEa, James Gammon Productions took over the entire recording, editing, production, and mastering processes. James Gammon is an alumnus of The Academical Village People, an all-male a cappella group at the University of Virginia. His clients have won many national and international a cappella awards thanks to his success in the studio.

== Awards ==
Virginia Belles awards and nominations
Awards and nominations
Award	Wins	Nominations
CARAs	3	14
RARB	1	-
BOCA	1	-
Voices Only	4	-
ICCAs	4	1

Totals (Note: Certain award groups do not simply award one winner. They acknowledge several different recipients, have runners-up, and have third place. Since this is a specific recognition and is different from losing an award, runner-up mentions are considered wins in this award tally. For simplification and to avoid errors, each award in this list has been presumed to have had a prior nomination.)
- Wins: 13
- Nominations: 15

=== Musical Awards ===
Contemporary A Cappella Recording Awards (CARAs)

Year	Nominee / work	Award	Result
2016	Right Hook	Best Female Collegiate Album	Nominated
2016	Jasleen Bawa for "Team" (Right Hook)	Best Female Collegiate Soloist	Nominated
2016	Brianna Meese, Michelle Gahagan for "Don't Wake Me Up" (Right Hook)	Best Female Collegiate Arrangement	Nominated
2014	Tintinnabulation	Best Female Collegiate Album	Nominated
2014	"Fire" (Tintinnabulation)	Best Female Collegiate Song	Nominated
2014	Jasleen Bawa for "Winter Trees" (Tintinnabulation)	Best Female Collegiate Soloist	Nominated
2014	Michelle Gahagan for "Winter Trees" (Tintinnabulation)	Best Female Collegiate Arrangement	Nominated
2012	"Love, Save the Empty" (Good Morning, Mr. Jefferson)	Best Female Collegiate Song	Nominated
2010	acaBELLEa	Best Female Collegiate Album	Nominated
2002	Aurora	Best Female Collegiate Album (Runner Up)	Won
2000	Bellissima	Best Female Collegiate Album (Runner Up)	Won
2000	"Fast Car" (Bellissima)	Best Female Collegiate Song	Nominated
2000	Heather Bates for (Bellissima)	Best Female Collegiate Soloist	Nominated
2000	Joelle Heise for (Bellissima)	Best Female Collegiate Arrangement	Won

Recorded A Cappella Review Board (RARB)

Year	Nominee / work	Award	Result
2009	"Big Girls Don’t Cry" (acaBELLEa)	2009 Song of the Year	Won

=== Selection for "Best Of" Compilation Albums ===
Best of College A Cappella (BOCA)

Year	Nominee / work	Award	Result
2014	"Fire" (Tintinnabulation)	BOCA 2014: Best of College A Cappella	Won

Voices Only A Cappella Compilation

Year	Nominee / work	Award	Result
2015	"Goodness Gracious" (Right Hook)	Voices Only 2015, Vol. 2	Won
2014	"Do My Thing" (Tintinnabulation)	Voices Only 2014, Vol. 1	Won
2013	"Rumour Has It" (Tintinnabulation)	Voices Only 2013, Vol. 1	Won
2011	"Love, Save the Empty" (Good Morning, Mr. Jefferson)	Voices Only 2011, Vol. 2	Won

=== A Cappella Competitions ===
International Competitive Collegiate A Cappella (ICCAs)

Year	Nominee / work	Award	Result
2003	Virginia Belles	ICCA Quarter-Finals—3rd Place	Won
2001	Virginia Belles	ICCA Semi-Finals—2nd Place	Won
2001	My-Van Nguyen	Outstanding Vocal Percussion	Won
2001	Lindsay Wilkonson	Outstanding Soloist	Nominated
2000	Virginia Belles	ICCA Quarter-Finals—3rd Place	Won

== Discography ==
- once, always (2025)
- Wherever You Go (2024)
- highs and lows (2023)
- In A College Town (2022)
- Love, Hazel (2021)
- Woman (2019)
- Lightning in a Bottle (2017)
- Right Hook (2015)
- Five - EP (2015)
- Tintinnabulation (2013)
- Good Morning Mr. Jefferson (2011)
- acaBELLEa (2009)
- Taking Every Detour (2007)
- Essentially Covered (2005)
- Sterling (2003)
- Aurora (2001)
- Bellissima (1999)
- Dig (1997)
- ReBELLEion (1995)
- Bar Belles (1992)
- Belle Bottoms (1991)
- AcaBELLEa (1990)

== Notable alumni ==
- Kelleigh Bannen - musician, solo artist
- Jia Tolentino - author, editor

== More A Cappella at UVA ==
- Virginia Gentlemen - all male
- Hullabahoos - all male
- The Academical Village People - all male
- Virginia Sil'hooettes - all female
- Hoos In Treble - all female
- The New Dominions - co-ed
- CHoosE - Christian
- Remix - hip - hop
- Achoostics - all female philanthropy
- Harmonious Hoos All-Gender A Cappella
