= Sentiment (Said the Sky album) =

Studio album by Said the Sky
- Released: February 18, 2022
- Genres: Electronic dance; pop-punk
- Length: 51:59
- Label: Lowly.
- Producer: Said the Sky

Said the Sky chronology
Wide-Eyed (2018)	Sentiment (2022)	Closer To The Sun (2025)

Singles from Sentiment
- 1. "We Know Who We Are" Released: May 21, 2021; 2. "Treading Water" Released: August 13, 2021; 3. "Go on Then, Love" Released: October 1, 2021; 4. "Walk Me Home" Released: February 11, 2022; 5. "Emotional Sickness" Released: February 16, 2022

Sentiment is the second studio album by American electronic dance music producer, DJ and musician, Said the Sky. The album was released on February 18, 2022, via Lowly. and his first album in three years since Wide-Eyed (2018). The album features collaborations with Caly Bevier, Olivver the Kid, The Maine, Boy in Space, Lil Lotus, Will Anderson from Parachute, FRND, Jack Newsome, We the Kings, Motion City Soundtrack, State Champs, Illenium and Chelsea Cutler. The album spawned five singles.

== Background and development ==
Right after his debut album, Wide-Eyed was released in 2018, Said the Sky read the comments and reviews about his album on Reddit and one comment stood out to him. The comment read, “[Wide-Eyed] is okay, it didn’t feel like he pushed and boundaries. Feels like another straight forward EDM album". Soon after, Said the Sky challenged himself to dig deeper and take those risks and drastic different approachment for next album, unlike Wide-Eyed to make such a change is bold and equally refreshing that became the inspiration to shape Sentiment.

The sophomore album was teased by Said the Sky for more than six months. On December 13, 2021, several photos were posted in his media social that shown a couple in love before the album title were announced with an image that shown the definition and meaning of "Sentiment" on December 15, 2021. On January 29, 2022, the cover art for the album and the release date officially revealed, all through his official media social.

Sentiment consist of fifteen tracks and five singles were release in order to promote the album. The first single, "We Know Who We Are", a song with Olivver the Kid was released on May 21, 2021, meanwhile the second and third single "Treading Water" and "Go on Then, Love" with the American rock band, The Maine was released on August 13 and October 1 in the same year. It followed by the released of the fourth single and final single, "Walk Me Home" with Illenium featuring vocal from American singer, Chelsea Cutler and "Emotional Sickness" with Will Anderson and his band, Parachute, on February 11 and February 16, 2022.

== Composition ==
=== Music ===
Musically, Sentiment mainly described as a genre-hopping album with hybrid between pop punk, and electronic dance taking influences from electronic pop, emo and acoustic. The album also contain elements from alternative rock, punk, rock and indie, as well as future bass, folk-pop and bedroom pop.

Ryan Morse of Conscious Electronic dubbed the album as more acoustically driven and genre-hopping. Raven Wright of EDM Identity noted that the album marks a shift in Said the Sky music, incorporating more acoustic, alternative rock and pop-punk, reflecting the evolving musical direction. Writing for Prelude Press, Dom Vigil stated Sentiment takes a darker approach to the electronic-pop crossover genre in contrast to Wide-Eyed and felt the sophomore album is not simple dance music, there are elements of punk, rock and indie felt. Camero Sunkel from EDM wrote the album evokes nostalgia, blending electronic and rock with consistent numerous pop-punk and emo-inspired electronic offerings, and with breezy acoustic guitars and augmenting the energy with punchy drums, soaring riffs, and dense synth pads. Creighton Branch from We Rave You described the album as nostalgic perfection with effortless blend of pop-punk and EDM Zach Salafia from Dancing Astronaut comment that although each song is decidedly different, they all cohesively piece together, unified by their pop-punk roots".

=== Theme ===
Sentiment by definition, refers to “exaggerated feelings of nostalgia,” and the album features plenty of nostalgia. Said the Sky explained that "Sentiment is about recognizing that sometimes things get tough and that’s ok. It’s human. Nobody is ever alone in feeling alone".

== Promotion ==
There were five singles released in 2021 and 2022 prior to the album released:

- We Know Who We Are (with Olivver the Kid), released on May 21, 2021.
- Treading Water, released on August 13, 2021.
- Go on Then, Love (with The Maine), released on October 1, 2021.
- Walk Me Home (with Illenium and Chelsea Cutler), released on February 11, 2022.
- Emotional Sickness (with Will Anderson and Parachute), released on February 16, 2022.

To support the album, Said the Sky announced Sentiment US Tour on his official media social, started from March 8 in Chico, California until May 28, at Minneapolis, Minnesota in the same year.

== Track listing ==
All the tracks are written and produced by Said the Sky, with additional producers and writers listed.

Sentiment track listing
No.	Title	Writer(s)	Producer(s)	Length
1.	"Gold" (with Caly Bevier)	Brian James Sammis; Caly Bevier; Michael Bedard		2:44
2.	"We Know Who We Are" (with Olivver the Kid)	Bryan Sammis		4:07
3.	"Go on Then, Love" (with The Maine)	John O'Callaghan		3:21
4.	"Spider" (with Boy in Space)	Robin Lundbäck		3:00
5.	"Move with Purpose" (with Olivver the Kid)	Brian Sammis; Daniel Braunstein		3:17
6.	"Stay" (with Lil Lotus)	Bryan Sammis; John "Elias" Villagran		3:42
7.	"Emotion Sickness" (with Will Anderson and Parachute)	Will Anderson; Nicholas Miller; Michael Pollack; Jake Torrey; Casey Smith	Parachute	3:22
8.	"Bittersweet Melody" (with FRND)	Andrew Goldstein		3:30
9.	"Holdin' My Own" (with Jack Newsome)	Jack Newsome		2:18
10.	"It Was You" (with We the Kings)	Bryan Sammis; We the Kings		3:46
11.	"Blue Eternal" (with Motion City Soundtrack)	Motion City Soundtrack		4:06
12.	"Legacy" (with State Champs)	Andrew Goldstein		3:22
13.	"Forgotten You" (with Olivver the Kid)	Bryan Sammis		4:10
14.	"Treading Water"	Jake Torrey; Rolland Spreckley; Tom Strahle		3:33
15.	"Walk Me Home" (with Illenium and Chelsea Cutler)	Nicholas Miller; Chelsea Cutler; Annika Wells	Illenium	3:36
Total length:				51:59

== Charts ==
Chart (2022)	Position
US Top Dance/Electronic Albums (Billboard)	24

== Release history ==
Standard edition

Release history and formats for Sentiment
Region	Date	Label	Format	Ref
Various	February 18, 2022	Lowly.	Digital download; streaming	
United States	January 2023	Lowly.; Diggers Factory	LP	
