= Overnight (album) =

Studio album by Parachute
- Released: August 13, 2013
- Genre: Pop rock
- Label: Mercury
- Producer: Oren Yoel

Parachute chronology
| The Way It Was (2011) | Overnight (2013) | Wide Awake (2016) |

Singles from Overnight
- 1. "Can't Help" Released: June 4, 2013

Overnight is the third studio album by American pop band Parachute. It was released on August 13, 2013, by Mercury Records. In this album, the band was pushed further into the pop music industry by creating a new, more upbeat sound that was not heard as much in their previous albums. Parachute immediately began touring upon the release of this album. They started the tour off by headlining with Matt Hires, followed by a tour with Walk off the Earth and Gavin DeGraw.

== Reception ==
The album debuted at No. 15 on the Billboard 200, No. 7 on the Digital Albums chart, selling around 15,257 copies in total on its first week of release. The album has sold 40,000 copies in the United States as of February 2016.

== Singles ==
The band released the first single, "Hearts Go Crazy", on February 26, 2013. This song was eventually removed from the album's track listing. The release of their next single, "Can't Help", followed on June 4, 2013. Will Anderson, lead singer of Parachute, co-wrote the single "Can't Help" with OneRepublic's Ryan Tedder.

== Track listing ==
| No. | Title | Writer(s) | Length |
|---|---|---|---|
| 1. | "Meant To Be" | Will Anderson | 3:25 |
| 2. | "Can't Help" | Anderson, Ryan Tedder, Oren Yoel | 3:23 |
| 3. | "Drive You Home" | Anderson | 3:49 |
| 4. | "Hurricane" | Anderson | 4:10 |
| 5. | "Overnight" | Anderson, Chris DeStefano, Ashley Gorley | 4:12 |
| 6. | "Didn't See It Coming" | Anderson | 3:32 |
| 7. | "The Other Side" | Anderson | 3:47 |
| 8. | "Waiting For That Call" | Anderson | 3:15 |
| 9. | "The Only One" | Anderson | 3:55 |
| 10. | "Disappear" | Anderson | 4:04 |
| 11. | "Higher" | Anderson | 3:32 |

== Personnel ==
- Will Anderson – lead vocals, guitar, keyboards
- Alex Hargrave – bass, vocals
- Johnny Stubblefield – drums, percussion, vocals
- Kit French – saxophone, keyboards, vocals
- Nate McFarland – lead guitar, vocals
