= The Wedding Weekend =

- David Harbour and The Wedding Weekend singers
- Directed by: Bruce Leddy
- Written by: Bruce Leddy
- Starring: David Harbour; Molly Shannon; Mark Feuerstein; Rosemarie DeWitt; Elizabeth Reaser
- Cinematography: Clyde Smith
- Edited by: Bill Deronde
- Music by: Jeff Cardoni
- Release dates: March 6, 2006 (US Comedy Arts Festival); April 27, 2007 (United States)
- Country: United States
- Language: English

The Wedding Weekend (also known as Shut Up & Sing and Sing Now or Forever Hold Your Peace) is a 2006 ensemble dramedy independent feature film starring David Harbour, Molly Shannon, Mark Feuerstein, Rosemarie DeWitt, Elizabeth Reaser, Alexander Chaplin, and Reg Rogers. It was written, directed and produced by Bruce Leddy. It features original a cappella versions of songs by Sting, Ben Folds, Phil Collins, Coldplay, and John Mayer performed by college groups including the Tufts Beelzebubs, UVA Academical Village People, MIT Logarhythms, and Oxford Out of the Blue. Classic songs by George Gershwin, Harold Arlen and Irving Berlin were arranged by Sean Altman and Kevin Weist.

== Plot ==
A group of guys who sang together in a college a cappella group reunite for a friend's wedding where they discover how they've progressed – and in some cases regressed – since their college heyday.

== Cast ==
- David Harbour as David
- Molly Shannon as Trish
- Mark Feuerstein as Greg
- Rosemarie DeWitt as Dana
- Elizabeth Reaser as Julep
- Alexander Chaplin as Ted
- Reg Rogers as Richard

== Production ==
The film was cast with New York-based actors by Avy Kaufman. It was shot on location in New York City and East Hampton, New York in August 2005 in only 22 shooting days. The primary location for the weekend setting was a mansion on Gibson Road in Sagaponack, NY which was torn down shortly after production ended. Post production took place in Los Angeles at Chainsaw and Levels Audio.

When the Weinstein Company decided to call their Dixie Chicks documentary Shut Up & Sing, a legal battle ensued and the producers were forced to retitle the film, first as Sing Now or Forever Hold Your Peace (Strand Releasing, 2007), and finally as The Wedding Weekend (First Look, 2008).

== Reception ==
The film received 9 awards on the festival circuit, including the Audience Award/Best Picture at the 2006 Aspen Comedy Festival, under the title Shut Up & Sing. The New York Times said, "Molly Shannon (gives) a selfless, robust performance." The Austin Chronicle said, "The Big Chill by way of Woody Allen, Noah Baumbach, and your high school glee club!" Movie Web said, "The Big Chill for this generation that will have audiences laughing from start to finish." Parental guidance group Common Sense Media rated the film 2 out of 5 stars, due to "a fair amount of 'wikt:locker room talk', as well as drinking and smoking (both cigarettes and pot)." The Los Angeles Times called it, "A breezy, well-paced diversion."
