= She Is Love (Parachute song) =

Single by Parachute

from the album Losing Sleep
- Released: May 13, 2009
- Recorded: 2009
- Genre: Soft rock
- Length: 2:26 (Album Version); 3:05 (Full Band Version)
- Label: Island Def Jam Music Group
- Songwriter: Will Anderson
- Producer: Chris Keup/Stewart Myers

Parachute singles chronology
"She Is Love" (2009)	"Under Control" (2009)

"She Is Love" is the debut single by American pop rock band, Parachute, and is the lead single from their debut album, Losing Sleep. It was released on May 13, 2009. It is their only song to enter the Billboard Hot 100 to date, peaking at #66. The song is also their most successful single to date, as it entered the Adult Alternative Songs, Adult Contemporary, Adult Pop Songs, Heatseekers Songs, Japan Hot 100 charts and is certified Gold by the RIAA. The album version was produced by Chris Keup/Stewart Myers. The full band version was produced by Kyle Kelso. Songwriter Will Anderson said that he tried to write a very simple love song that he could sing in front of a room full of girls he was trying to get to come to a show.

== Appearance in media ==
In 2009, The acoustic version of “She Is Love” was used for a commercial for Nivea

== Charts ==
=== Weekly charts ===
Chart (2009)	Peak position
Japan (Japan Hot 100)	37
US Billboard Hot 100	66
US Adult Alternative Airplay (Billboard)	23
US Adult Contemporary (Billboard)	17
US Adult Pop Airplay (Billboard)	14
US Heatseekers Songs (Billboard)	4

=== Year-end charts ===
Chart (2009)	Position
US Adult Top 40	41

=== Sales and certifications ===
Region	Certification	Certified units/sales
United States (RIAA)	Platinum	1,000,000^{‡}
^{‡} Sales+streaming figures based on certification alone.

== Release history ==
Release dates and formats for "She Is Love"
Region	Date	Format	Label(s)	Ref.
United States	June 22, 2009	Mainstream airplay	Island	
