= Under Control (Parachute song) =

Single by Parachute

from the album Losing Sleep
- Released: May 17, 2009
- Recorded: 2009
- Genre: Pop rock
- Length: 4:20 (album version); 3:26 (vocal mix)
- Label: Island Def Jam Music Group
- Songwriter: Will Anderson

Parachute singles chronology
"She Is Love" (2009)	"Under Control" (2009)	"Something to Believe In" (2011)

"Under Control" is a song by American pop rock band Parachute. It was released on May 17, 2009 as the second single from their debut studio album, Losing Sleep (2009). It debuted at #33 on the Adult Pop Songs chart as of December 25, 2009 and has peaked at #27.

== About the song ==
In this song the protagonist is in love with a female friend. He's tired of suppressing his feelings and he's finally going to tell her how he feels. Grammy-winning producer John Shanks produced this song, along with the rest of the album. Parachute singer/songwriter Will Anderson told PopEntertainment.com how they hooked up with Shanks: "John had called our manager and heard our stuff. We were really excited that he had shown interest in it. We went up there and hit it off. He's an incredible producer – he's worked with everybody from Bon Jovi to Ashlee Simpson and everyone in between. He taught us a lot about the studio and how to record an album."

== Music video ==
The music video was directed by Scott Speer and premiered on October 2, 2009. The video featured a new mix of the lead vocal. The new mix is already receiving mixed reviews from fans.

== Charts ==
=== Weekly charts ===
Chart (2010)	Peak position
US Adult Pop Airplay (Billboard)	27
