= Can't Help =

Single by Parachute

from the album Overnight
- Released: June 4, 2013
- Recorded: 2013
- Songwriters: Will Anderson, Oren Yoel, Ryan Tedder

Parachute singles chronology
"What I Know" (2011)	"Can't Help" (2013)

"Can't Help" is a song by the band Parachute.

== Background ==
Parachute announced their plans for a third full-length album in late 2012. "Hearts Go Crazy", originally intended as the lead single, was released on iTunes on February 26, 2013 featuring a new electronic direction to the band's sound. A second single, "Can't Help", written by Will Anderson and Ryan Tedder of OneRepublic (who originally intended for the song to be given to Cee Lo Green), was released on June 2, 2013. The band also performed "Can't Help" on The Tonight Show with Jay Leno. On June 13, 2013, the band announced that their third album would be called Overnight, and it was released on August 13, 2013. "Hearts Go Crazy", originally intended to be the lead single, was not included on the album and the band instead promoted "Can't Help", later releasing a music video in support of this radio single. Overnight remained in the top ten of the iTunes album charts continuously during its first day and week of release, reaching the #3 spot, and has since garnered national and international recognition. "Overnight" also marked the band's highest US Billboard 200 chart position, reaching #15. In May 2014, Nate McFarland announced on the Parachute Facebook Page that he was leaving the band to study Business in University.

== Charts ==
=== Weekly charts ===
Chart (2013)	Peak position
US Adult Pop Airplay (Billboard)	21
