= Blaire Reinhard =

American singer and pianist

The Blaire Reinhard Band
- Origin: Hoboken, New Jersey, USA
- Genres: Rock, Pop
- Years active: 2008 - present
- Labels: Unsigned
- Website: www.blaireband.com

Blaire Reinhard is a singer, pianist, and songwriter from Morristown, New Jersey. She is the granddaughter of trumpet player and Tonight Show bandleader Doc Severinsen. On September 7, 2012, her single "No Nothing" with Curtis & Reinhard reached #92 on the iTunes US Pop Music Chart.

== Live performances ==
Blaire has performed in choral programs at venues like Carnegie Hall and Notre Dame de Paris, and as a featured soloist with the Minnesota Orchestra singing original music arranged for big band, orchestra, and choir. Blaire also regularly performs with The Blaire Reinhard Band ("The BRB"), Curtis & Reinhard ("C&R"), and other groups in and around New York City. The BRB has opened for national artists such as Pete Francis of Dispatch, Kenny Loggins, the Gin Blossoms, Paul Rodgers of Bad Company, Stephen Kellogg and the Sixers, the Pat McGee Band, and Blessid Union of Souls. They have been joined onstage by harmonica virtuoso John Popper of Blues Traveler and have jammed with guitar-tapping legend Stanley Jordan.

== TV and film ==
Blaire's music and voice have appeared in television shows (e.g., So You Think You Can Dance, Dance Moms, Lincoln Heights theme song, Felicity, Over There, The Black Donnellys, Army Wives, The Young and the Restless, and the MTV microseries Fresh Takes starring Alicia Keys and Nick Lachey), feature films (e.g., Feel The Beat, The Friend, The Namesake, Step Up, The Merry Gentleman, and Cow Belles), radio and cable broadcasts, and other media (e.g., Pink Together breast cancer awareness campaign).

== Discography ==
- Gamblers and Fancy Women (2016, with Curtis & Reinhard)
- At The Pigeon Club (2012, Curtis & Reinhard debut album)
- Concert for Lauren (2010, Blaire Reinhard Band live album)
- Steps on the Ceiling (2009, Blaire Reinhard Band debut album)
- Somewhere in Between (2005, solo album)
- Tangled (2004, The Sil'hooettes a cappella album, feat. Blaire as music director, soloist, and award-winning arranger)
- Merry Christmas from Doc Severinsen and The Tonight Show Orchestra (1991, feat. Blaire as soloist on "Silent Night")
