= Losing Sleep (Parachute album) =

Studio album by Parachute
- Released: May 19, 2009; August 4, 2009 (Deluxe Edition)
- Genre: Pop rock
- Label: Island Def Jam Music Group
- Producer: John Shanks

Parachute chronology
Losing Sleep (2009)	The Way It Was (2011)

Singles from Losing Sleep
- 1. "She Is Love" Released: May 13, 2009; 2. "Under Control" Released: May 17, 2009

Losing Sleep is the debut studio album from pop rock band Parachute. It debuted at number 40 on the Billboard 200 and debuted at number two on the Digital Albums Chart in the United States.

== Critical reception ==
Professional ratings
Review scores
Source	Rating
AllMusic	3/5 stars
Melodic	4/5 stars

Kaj Roth of Melodic gave high praise to the songs for being "catchy and groovy and shouts out longevity", singling out the single "She Is Love" as being an example of "many future hit singles that will conquer the air waves from now on." AllMusic's Andrew Leahey noted how Shanks' "polished" production and the use of "thicker harmonies and gauzy, synthesized string sections" throughout the track listing speak of the band's mainstream aspirations, concluding that "ambition is good for any young band, and Parachute is talented enough to warrant the starry-eyed approach."

== Track listing ==
All tracks are written by Will Anderson solely, unless otherwise noted.

No.	Title	Length
1.	"All That I Am"	4:16
2.	"Back Again"	3:04
3.	"She (For Liz) (co-written by John Shanks)"	3:07
4.	"The Mess I Made"	3:51
5.	"She Is Love"	2:26
6.	"Ghost (co-written by Nate McFarland)"	3:41
7.	"Under Control"	3:55
8.	"Blame It on Me (co-written by Dan Wilson)"	3:25
9.	"Words Meet Heartbeats (co-written by Chris Keup)"	3:17
10.	"The New Year"	4:14
11.	"She Is Love (Full Band Version)"	3:05

Deluxe Edition bonus tracks
No.	Title	Length
12.	"Be Here"	3:54
13.	"Losing Sleep"	3:42
14.	"All That I Am (Acoustic Version)"	3:32

Amazon MP3 bonus track
No.	Title	Length
12.	"Stuck in the Middle"	3:49

iTunes bonus track
No.	Title	Length
12.	"Strange World"	3:47

== Charts ==
Chart (2009)	Peak position
U.S. Billboard 200	40
U.S. Digital Albums	2

== Personnel ==
Parachute

- Will Anderson - lead vocals, guitar, piano
- Johnny Stubblefield - drums, percussion
- Alex Hargrave - bass
- Kit French - saxophone, keyboards, percussion
- Nate McFarland - lead guitar, backing vocals

Additional personnel

- John Shanks - guitar
- Mark Goldenberg - electric guitar
- George Stanford - trombone
- Daniel Clarke - keyboards
- Charles Judge - keyboards
- Ken Chastain - percussion
- Jeff Rothschild - programming
