= The Way It Was (album) =

Studio album by Parachute
- Released: May 17, 2011
- Recorded: 2010; Haunted Hollow, Ocean Way Studios, Studio Wishbone, Los Angeles, CA.
- Genre: Pop rock, blue-eyed soul
- Length: 40:54
- Label: Island Def Jam Music Group
- Producer: John Fields

Parachute chronology
Losing Sleep (2009)	The Way It Was (2011)	Overnight (2013)

Singles from The Way It Was
- 1. "Something to Believe In" Released: February 8, 2011; 2. "Kiss Me Slowly" Released: 2011; 3. "You And Me" Released: May 3, 2011; 4. "What I Know" Released: May 17, 2011

Professional ratings
Review scores
Source	Rating
Allmusic	3/5 stars

The Way It Was is the second studio album by American pop rock band Parachute, released by Island Def Jam Music Group on May 17, 2011. The album debuted at number 19 on the Billboard 200 chart, number 7 on the Rock Albums chart and number 4 on the Digital Albums chart. The band tested new songs "What I Know", "White Dress", "Halfway", "Square One", "Break My Heart for Me" and "Something to Believe in" during their 2010 fall tour. On December 4, 2010, Parachute released a viral video on ESPN and ABC for "Something to Believe in".

Leading up to the release of The Way It Was Parachute released the singles "Kiss Me Slowly" co-written by Dave Haywood and Charles Kelley of Lady Antebellum, "You and Me" exclusively on iTunes and "Halfway" on Amazon. Released May 17, 2011, The Way It Was was featured as a New Release on iTunes and the single "What I Know" was a free track available for exclusive download for release week. The album's title comes from a lyric in "What I Know".

== Track listing ==
All tracks are written by Will Anderson, except where noted.

No.	Title	Length
1.	"White Dress"	3:36
2.	"You and Me"	3:37
3.	"Something to Believe In"	4:44
4.	"Forever and Always"	4:09
5.	"What I Know"	4:13
6.	"American Secrets"	6:19
7.	"Kiss Me Slowly" (Anderson, Dave Haywood, Charles Kelley)	3:56
8.	"Halfway"	3:10
9.	"Philadelphia"	7:10

== Charts ==
Chart (2011)	Peak position
U.S. Billboard 200	20
U.S. Rock Albums	7
U.S. Digital Albums	4

== Personnel ==
- John Fields – guitar, keyboards, programming
- Will Anderson – lead vocals, guitar, keyboards
- Alex Hargrave – vocals, bass
- Johnny Stubblefield – vocals, drums, percussion
- Kit French – vocals, saxophone, keyboards
- Nate McFarland – vocals, guitar
