= The Academical Village People =

University of Virginia a cappella group

The Academical Village People (AVP) is an a cappella group at the University of Virginia founded in 1993 by a group of people who vowed to "never take themselves too seriously." They set themselves apart from other groups by being able to keep professional while maintaining their lax attitude, wild antics while performing, and their less traditional uniform of a garage mechanic style shirt. The name "Academical Village People" comes from Thomas Jefferson's Academical Village at the university in Charlottesville, Virginia. As of 2017, AVP, as it is often called for short, has released thirteen studio albums, including a greatest hits album, DECADEmical: Best of 1993-2003, of its first ten years in existence. The group has recorded many notable performances such as opening for Dana Carvey and Girl Talk, performing for Reba McEntire at the White House, concerts at the Kennedy Center, and performances in such countries as England, Spain, and Scotland.

AVP posing with Reba McEntire in the White House

== History ==
=== Beginnings ===
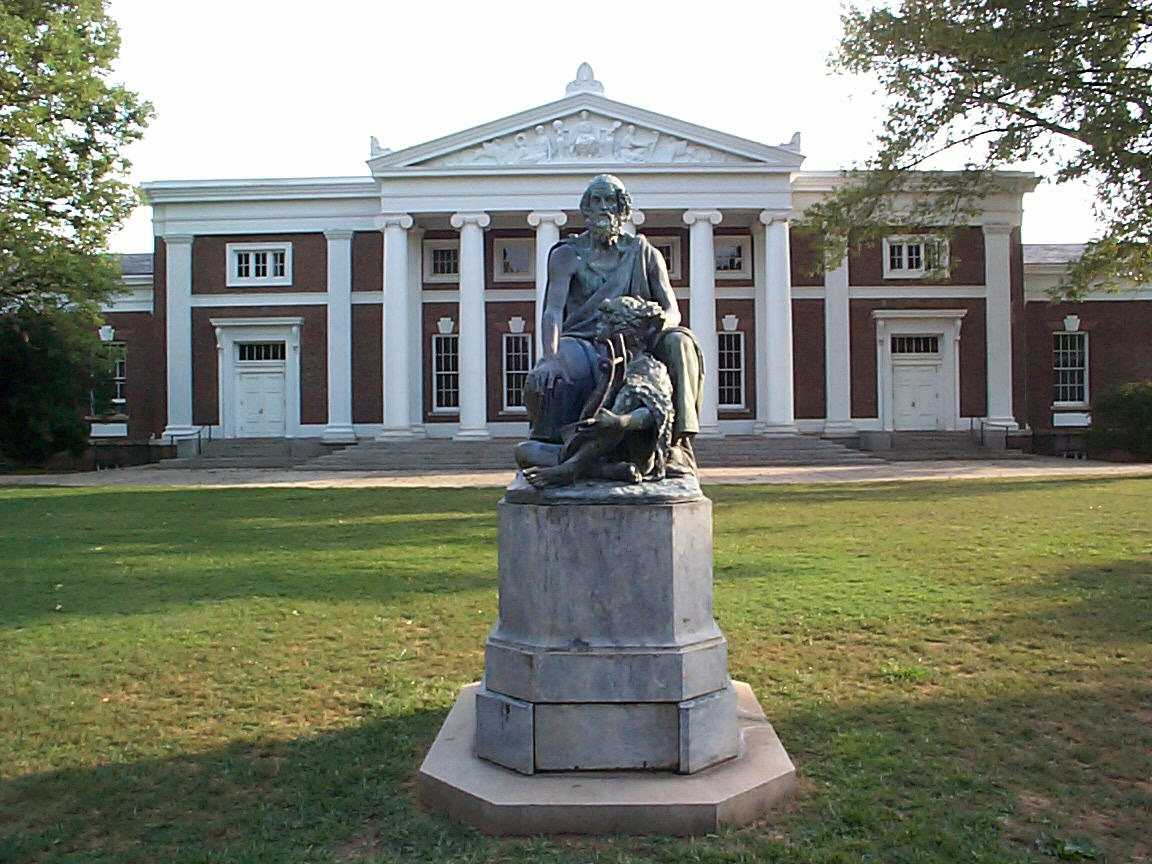
The statue of Homer and Old Cabell Hall at the University where the founders of AVP first met together.

In May 1993, a few first-year (i.e., freshman) students at the University of Virginia gathered in the bathroom on the first floor Old Cabell Hall to sing together. All of them had been involved in other musical organizations such as University Singers, the Virginia Glee Club, or the First Year Players in previous semesters, and each also did not quite fit the mold of the other UVA a cappella groups, the Hullabahoos and/or the Virginia Gentlemen. They sang a few songs together like Billy Joel's "The Longest Time", and "In the Still of the Night". They realized their potential as a group, made the decision to meet together again in the fall. The following fall brought many challenges. It was very difficult for them to regain everyone's interest after a long summer and to start something completely new at the university, but they were able to get eight people back together: Adam Nierow, Tom Nassif, Tim Dobiac, Rob Blatt, Kelly Caylor, Nick Comerford,

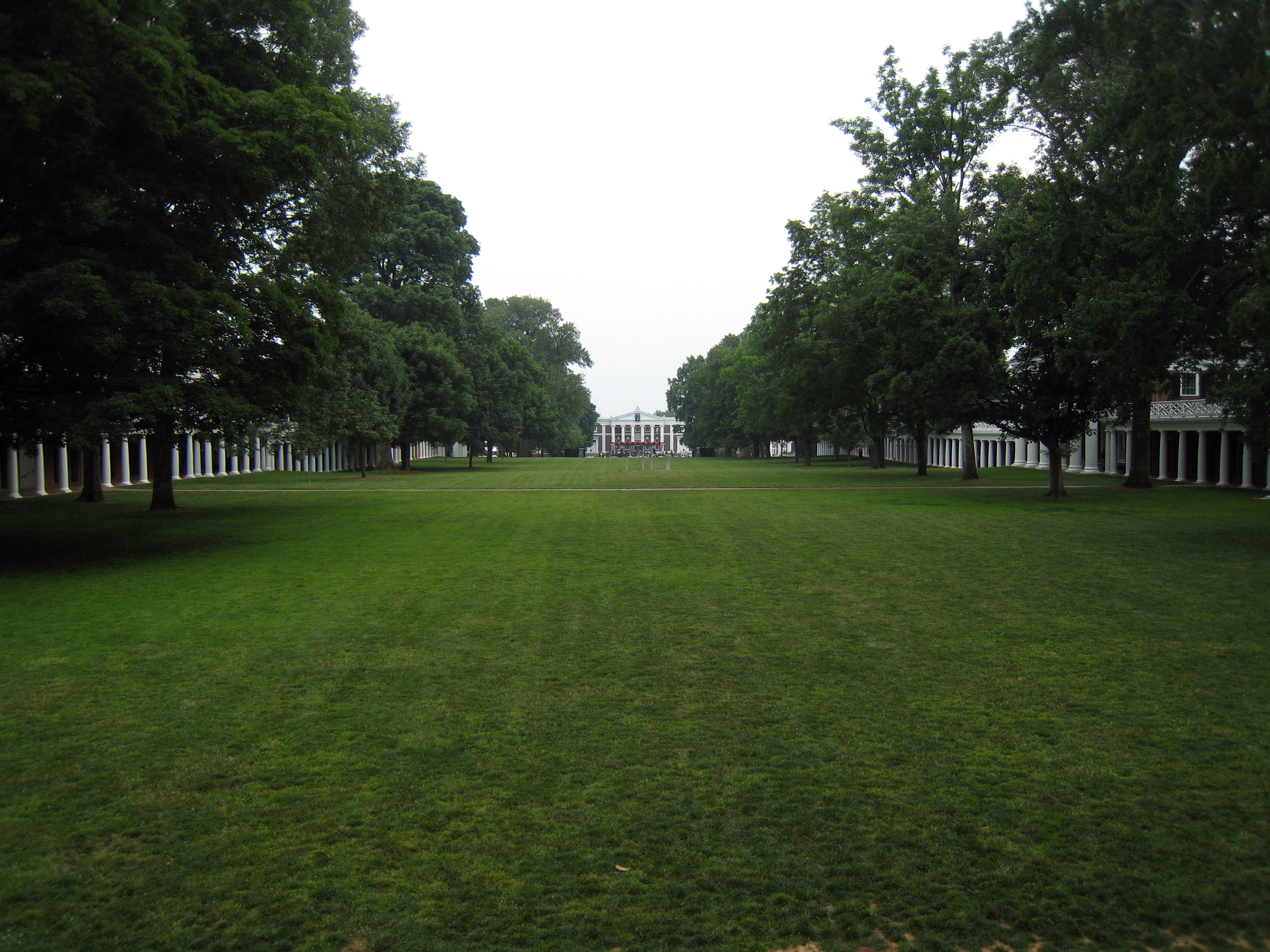
The Lawn at the center of the University of Virginia

Tim Withers, and Andrew Oh. The eight of them practiced regularly, chose the name "Academical Village People," and gave the first concert during the fall semester of 1993. Upon returning after winter break, Andrew Oh had decided to leave the group. Based on this decision, along with other reasons, Tim Dobiac also decided to walk away. Being reduced to six, the founders of AVP were very nervous to continue what they had started. They accepted four new members during their first set of auditions, Dave Davick, Doug Min, Matt Svoboda, Scott Zetlan, and the group that is the Academical Village People began its journey.

The name "Academical Village People" was not the only one considered by the founders. The official name was almost "The Lawn Boys", named after The Lawn at the University of Virginia. Other names that were thrown about were "Second Nature", because all of the founders were second-year students, and "Bucolic Chihuahuas". After much debate, the six of them decided to call themselves "The Academical Village People", after the name Thomas Jefferson gave to the oldest part of the University of Virginia, The Academical Village. Although the founders were concerned about being confused as a rap group, or being associated with The Village People, the name has stuck, and to this day AVP is still a successful college a cappella group.

=== Traditions ===
==== Nicknames ====
Every member of AVP receives a nickname to be patched onto his garage shirt at his second concert with the group. Traditionally, a secret email thread is created behind those receiving their new nicknames, and the rest of the group decides on a name. Nicknames can be anything from the person's last name to something completely bizarre.

==== Class Names ====
After every weekend of auditions, the members of the group create a class name to be given to those selected to be in the group from that weekend's pool of auditions. Examples include "The Fortunate Frenchman", "Satanic Turkeys", and "Barefoot Pimpin' Part 3".

== Events ==
=== Auditions ===
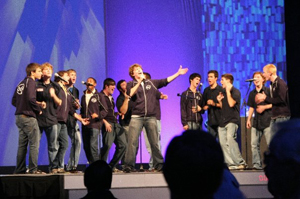
AVP performing onstage in Philadelphia during their 2008 Fall Roll

Every semester at the University of Virginia, male students have the opportunity to audition and potentially become a member of AVP. Those interested come prepared with a verse and chorus of a song of their choosing. They are asked to sing scales, do ear training exercises, and sing their prepared piece. Callbacks for the group consist of going out to lunch or spending time with the group at the AVP house in order to get to know all of them followed by an intensive day in which those called back learn a part to a song in AVP's current repertoire, then have their own individual callback audition.

=== Concerts ===
The group holds two concerts each year, one in the Fall semester and one in the Spring Semester. Each concert typically consists of around 15 songs, a video presentation, a skit presentation, and a guest group performance. The members traditionally wear khaki pants, denim shirts, and "wacky" ties for the first half, and their garage shirts for the second half.

==== Village Jam ====
Village Jam is a charity concert held by The Academical Village People in February. The first village jam was held in 2005 to aid those affected by Hurricane Katrina. It has since become an annual concert. Each year it is held, the members at the time choose a worthy cause in which to donate all of the profits from the show.

==== Dorm Sings ====
Dorm sings are events in which AVP, often with other a cappella groups at the University of Virginia, get together and travel to the two main areas of freshman dorms to perform. These events offer freshmen students with a great opportunity to see the groups of UVA just outside their homes, and they are most often held on Wednesday nights.

=== Fall Roll ===
Every fall semester, the members of the Academical Village People traditionally spend their fall breaks going on a road trip together visiting other colleges, performing notable concerts, such as opening for Dana Carvey in Philadelphia in 2008, and just having a good time together.

The group posing with Dana Carvey after it opened for him in the fall of 2008

=== Album Recording ===
AVP has been recording studio albums since their debut album Hoos Your Daddy? in 1994. The group's first five CD's were recorded at Virginia Arts Recording in Charlottesville, VA by Paul Brier, with the assistance of Ken Hutton during the recording of Calabash!. Throughout the production of these five albums, AVP was in search of the company that would provide the best mixing for its tracks. Hoos Your Daddy? was mixed by Paul Brier at Virginia Arts Recording, Maniac Bus Driver by Ray Salyer at Candock Recording Studios in Myrtle Beach, SC, Calabash! at Back Pocket Studios in New York City, NY, ¡Gracias, Por Favor! by Ken Schubert at Cue Recording in Falls Church, VA, and Room Zero by Bill Hare at Bill Hare Productions in Milpitas, CA.

Beginning with the tracks "Here's to the Night" and "Doin' Time (Summertime)"" on DECADEmical: Best of 1993-2003, James Gammon, a member of the group at the time, began recording the tracks for the group's CD's. Gammon recorded edited the entirety of Scantily Plaid, then it was shipped out to Bill Hare to be mixed. Academical is Not a Word was a transitional project in that Gammon recorded all of the tracks, and mixed a handful of them himself, the remainder being mixed again by Bill Hare. James Gammon went on to start his own business once he graduated from the university and from the group. Since this moment, all of AVP's albums have been fully recorded and mixed by James Gammon at James Gammon Productions.

== Members ==
The Academical Village People generally consists of between 13 and 18 members all ranging from 1st-years to 4th-years at UVA.

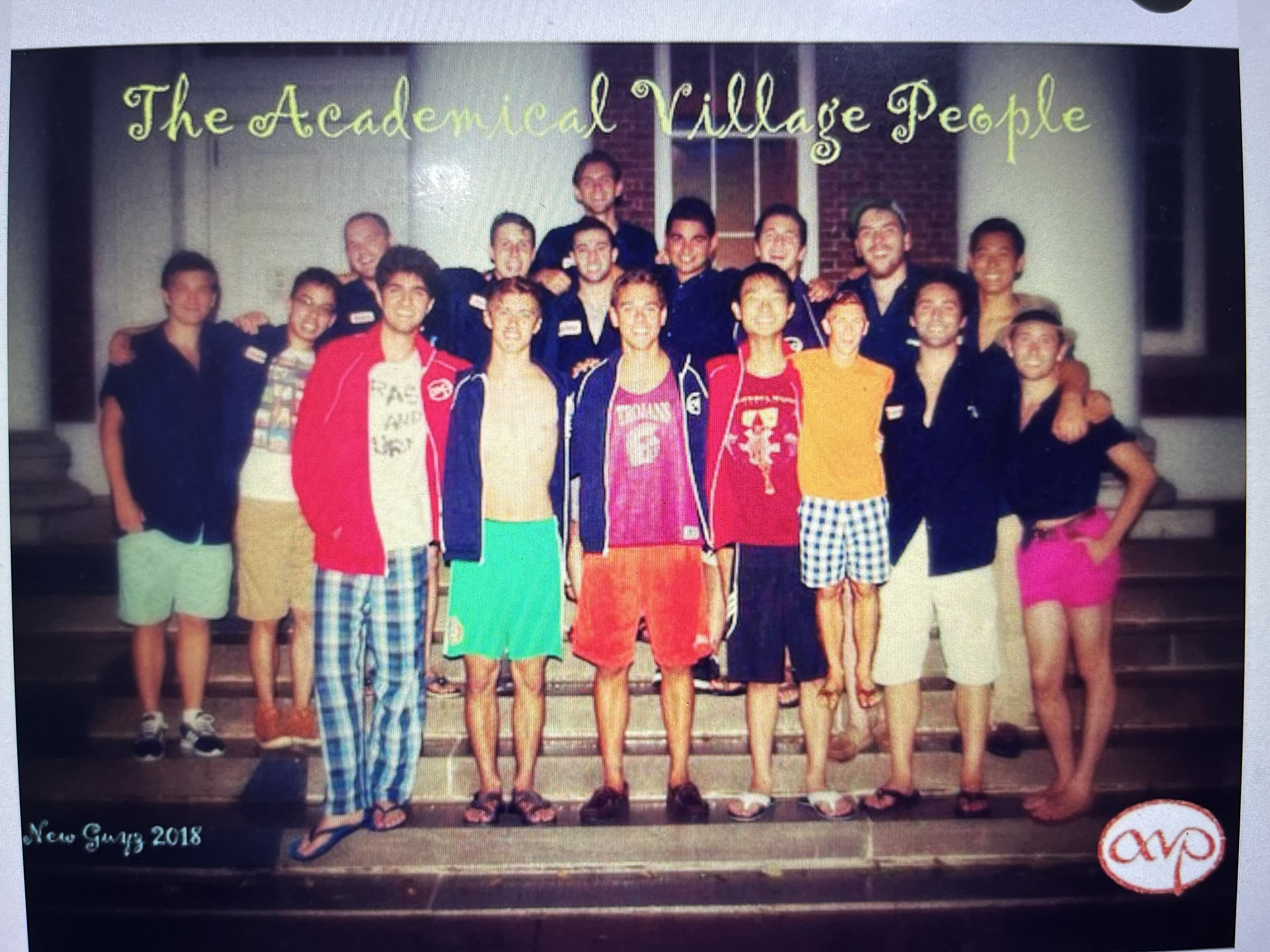
The new AVP right after Fall auditions of 2014

=== Founders ===
- Rob Blatt
- Kelly Caylor
- Nick Comerford
- Tom Nassif
- Adam "Cage Boy" Nierow
- Tim "Old Man Withers" Withers
- Biff "Mythical" Tradwell

== Awards and recognitions ==
=== Album Tracks Selected To Best of College A Cappella (BOCA) ===
- "Love Runs Out", the song originally recorded by OneRepublic was selected off of the 2015 album "Another Round" for the "BOCA 2016: Best of College A Cappella '16" compilation put together by Varsity Vocals.
- "Domino", the song originally recorded by Jessie J was selected off of the 2013 album "Sorry for the Noise" for the "BOCA 2014: Best of College A Cappella '14" compilation put together by Varsity Vocals.
- "The Reason", the song whose lyrics were written by Andrew "Gumby" Breton as a parody of the original recording of "The Reason" by Hoobastank, was selected off of the 2005 album Academical is Not a Word for the Boca 2006:Best of College A Cappella '06 compilation put together by Varsity Vocals.
- "Kate", the song originally recorded by The Ben Folds Five, was selected off of the 2003 album Scantily Plaid for the Boca 2004:Best of College A Cappella '04 compilation put together by Varsity Vocals.
- "Fields of Gold", the song originally recorded by Sting, was selected off of the 2001 album Room Zero for the BOCA 2002:Best of College A Cappella '02 compilation put together by Varsity Vocals.
- "Angel", the song originally recorded by Aerosmith, was selected off of the 1998 album Calabash! for the BOCA 1999:Best of College A Cappella 1999 compilation put together by Varsity Vocals.

=== Album Tracks Selected to Voices Only ===
- "You're On", the song originally recorded by Madeon, was selected off of the 2015 album "Another Round" for the 2-disc "Voices Only 2015" complication of the best of college A Cappella produced by Corey Slutsky.
- "Too Close", the song originally recorded by Alex Clare, was selected off of the 2013 album "Sorry for the Noise" for the 2-disc "Voices Only 2014" compilation of the best of college A Cappella produced by Corey Slutsky.
- "Dance With Me Tonight", the song originally recorded by Olly Murs, was selected off of the 2013 album "Sorry for the Noise" for the 2-disc "Voices Only 2013" compilation of the best of college A Cappella produced by Corey Slutsky.
- "Come Sail Away", the song originally recorded by Styx, was selected off of the 2011 album Pillow Talk for the 2-disc Voices Only 2011 compilation of the best of college A Cappella produced by Corey Slutsky.
- "Lovers in Japan", the song originally recorded by Coldplay, was selected off of the 2009 album All Night Lawn for the 2-disc Voices Only 2009 compilation of the best of college A Cappella produced by Corey Slutsky.

=== Album Tracks Selected for acaTunes Awards ===
- "Chicago", the song originally recorded by Sufjan Stevens, was selected off of the 2007 album Learn to Interact for an acaTunes award in 2007. acaTunes is a digital, online A Cappella music store where those interested may purchase collegiate A Cappella recordings. The organization chose what it felt were the top 15 songs recorded by college A Cappella groups in 2007 for these awards.

=== Album Tracks Selected for Sing! Compilations ===
- "Kate" was selected off of Scantily Plaid for the Sing: Vocal Explosion (2004) A Cappella compilation.
- "Do You Love Me?" was selected off of Academical is Not a Word for the Sing II: Electric Boogaloo (2005) A Cappella compilation.

=== Recognition in the Contemporary A Cappella Recording Awards (CARA) ===
- In 2013, AVP received the following nominations for the album "Sorry for the Noise"
  - The entire album was nominated for best male collegiate album
- In 2012, the arrangement of "Subterranean Homesick Alien", written by Jordan Yonce, received a nomination for "Best Male Collegiate Arrangement."
- In 2008, AVP received the following nominations for the album Learn to Interact:
  - The arrangement of "Chicago", written by Davis Gouldin and now professional A Cappella recording producer James Gammon, received a nomination for "Best Male Collegiate Arrangement".
  - "Chicago" was also nominated for "Best Male Collegiate Song".
- In 2006, AVP received the following nominations for the album Academical is Not a Word:
  - The entire album was nominated for "Best Male Collegiate Album".
  - James Gammon's arrangement of "The Scientist" was nominated for "Best Male Collegiate Arrangement".
  - "The Reason", a parody by Andrew "Gumby" Breton made off of the original Hoobastank song, was nominated for "Best Humor Song".
    - AVP won "Best Humor Song" with this hilarious recording.
- In 2002, AVP received the following nominations for the album Room Zero:
  - The entire album was nominated for "Best Male Collegiate Album".
  - Mark Manley's arrangement of "Just the Two of Us" received a nomination for "Best Male Collegiate Arrangement"
  - Mikey Daguiso received a "Best Male Collegiate Soloist" nomination for his performance in AVP's rendition of "I Want You Back."
    - Daguiso won this award.
- In 2001, Mark Manley won the award for "Best Male Collegiate Soloist" for his performance in "Wicked Game" on the album ¡Gracias, Por Favor!.
- In 1999, AVP received the following nominations for the album Calabash!:
  - The entire album was nominated for "Best Male Collegiate Album".
  - "Angel" received a nomination for "Best Male Collegiate Song".
  - Mike Ludwick received a "Best Male Collegiate Soloist" nomination for his performance in "Angel".

=== Recognition by the Recorded A Cappella Review Board (RARB) ===
- The following of AVP's albums were given honorable mention:
  - ¡Gracias, Por Favor! in 2001.
- The following of AVP's albums were selected as "RARB Picks":
  - Scantily Plaid in 2004.

=== Performance in The International Championship of College A Cappella ===
- In 2004, The Academical Village people competed in the ICCA Competition and won first place in the South Region Quarterfinals held at The College of William and Mary. The group was awarded for "Outstanding Choreography" and Mikey Daguiso was awarded "Outstanding Soloist" for his performance in "I Will Survive" in this round.
  - The group did not place in the South Region Semifinals held at Clemson University, but Drew Willson was awarded "Outstanding Soloist" for his performance in "Do You Love Me?"
- In 2002, AVP once again competed in the ICCA Competition and won first place in the South Region Quarterfinals held at The College of William and Mary. JB Berry was also awarded the "Mariah Carey Glitter Award" in this round.
  - The group placed third in the South Region Semifinals held at Virginia Tech. Mikey Daguiso was awarded an "Outstanding Soloist" recognition, and JB Berry was awarded the "TK Fashion Award".
- In 1998, AVP competed in the ICCA Competition for its first time. It won first place in the South Region Quarterfinals held in its very own hometown of Charlottesville, Virginia at the University of Virginia. Mike Ludwick was recognized as the runner up for the "Outstanding Soloist" award for his performance of "Angel."
  - AVP also placed first at the South Region Semifinals held at Johns Hopkins University. At this portion of the competition, Peter Habib was awarded "Outstanding Arrangement" for his arrangement of "Angel."
    - The group placed third in the National Championships held at Carnegie Hall in New York City, New York.
