= Parachute (band) =

American pop rock band

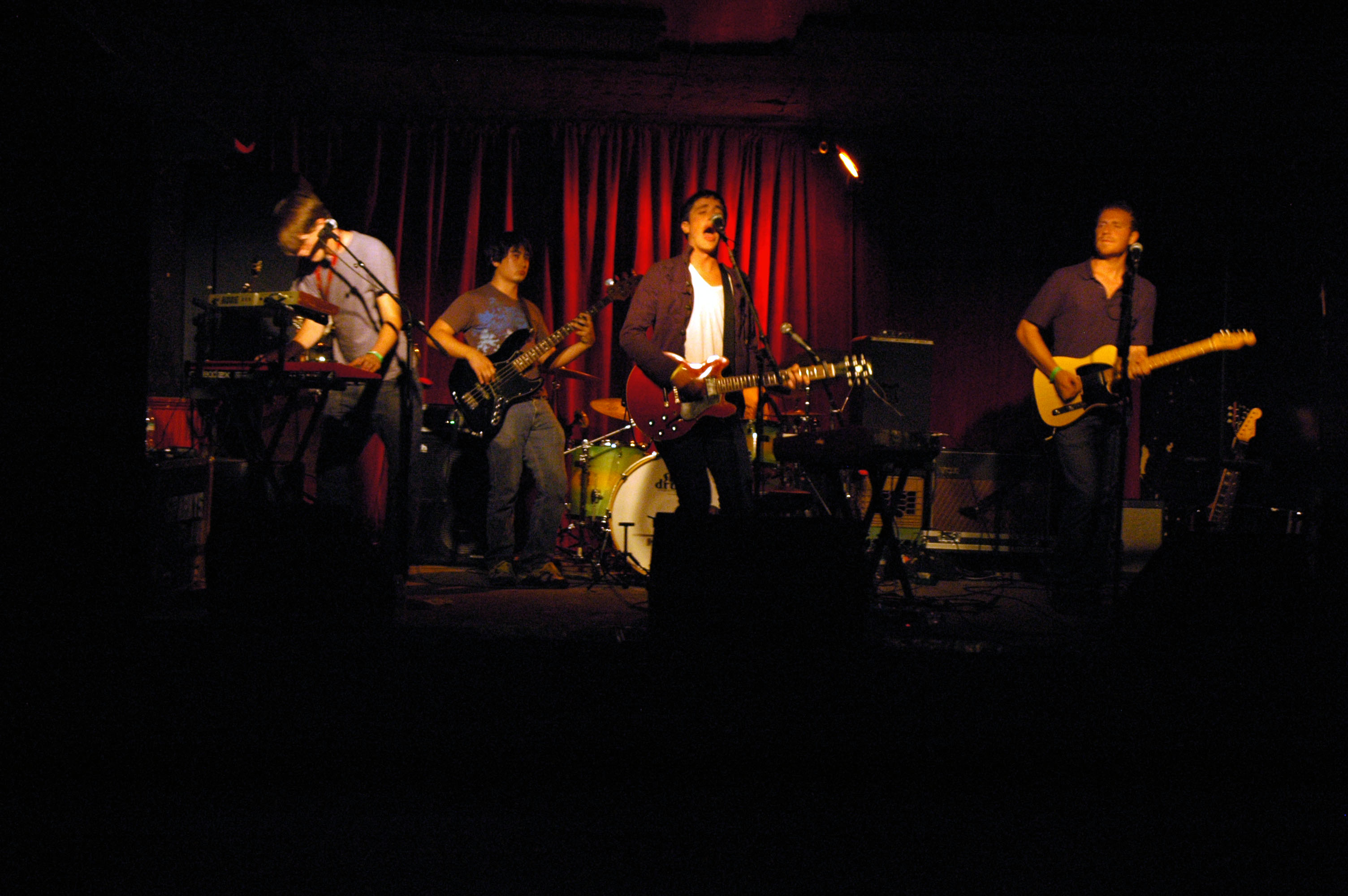
- American pop rock band Parachute live in 2008

Background information
- Also known as: Sparky's Flaw
- Origin: Charlottesville, Virginia, United States
- Genres: Pop rock; blue-eyed soul
- Years active: 2006–2019; 2026–present
- Labels: Mercury, The Island Def Jam Music Group, Vanguard, DreamWorks
- Members: Will Anderson (vocals, guitar, piano); Nate McFarland (guitar, vocals); Alex Hargrave (bass, guitar, vocals); Johnny Stubblefield (drums); Kit French (keyboards, vocals, saxophone)
- Past members: David Glover (guitar); Peter De Jong (guitar); Eric Prum (piano); Michael Reaves (percussion)

Parachute is an American pop rock band from Charlottesville, Virginia, United States. Formed in 2006, they released their major-label debut album, Losing Sleep, in 2009, followed by their second album, The Way It Was, in 2011 and their third album, Overnight, in 2013. Vanguard Records released the band's fourth album, Wide Awake, on March 11, 2016. The band independently released their fifth album, Parachute, in May 2019.

== History ==
Will Anderson and Johnny Stubblefield, friends from childhood, formed the band Sparky's Flaw while attending Charlottesville High School; David Glover, Kit French and Alex Hargrave, long-time friends and classmates of the two, soon joined. Peter De Jong and Eric Prum rounded out the lineup when the band started to record their initial EP's.

While in college, the band signed a record deal with Mercury Records in August 2007. In the same month, Nate McFarland, a classmate and friend of Anderson's at the University of Virginia, joined the band. McFarland and Anderson were both part of the all-male a cappella group, the Virginia Gentlemen, while at college. After graduating from college in May 2008, the band began touring full-time. Later that year, they changed their name to Parachute.

Parachute's debut album, Losing Sleep, became available in stores and online on May 19, 2009. It was produced by Chris Keup, John Shanks, and John Fields. On May 12, it was released exclusively on iTunes with a bonus track. The second single from the album, "Under Control", was also highlighted as the 'Free iTunes Single of the Week'. A deluxe edition of the album was released on August 4, 2009. The song "Back Again" is featured in the video game Band Hero which was released on November 3, 2009.

Their songs "She Is Love" and "Under Control" were used on Nivea's national skincare TV commercials. As part of the campaign, Parachute shared the Nivea Countdown Stage with the Jonas Brothers and Taylor Swift in front of over a million people in Times Square for New Year's Eve in 2008.

On June 15, 2009, Will Anderson and Kit French appeared as Parachute on the twentieth episode of Live From Daryl's House, the monthly internet concert from Daryl Hall. They performed four songs from their debut album as well as the Hall & Oates tracks "Say It Isn't So" and "It's a Laugh". In August 2009, Parachute was featured as a 'Soundcheck Risers' artist on walmart.com. "She is Love," was certified platinum by the Recording Industry Association of America on June 30, 2017.

Parachute's second full-length album, The Way It Was, was released on May 17, 2011. It debuted at number 19 on the Billboard 200 chart, number 7 on the Rock Albums chart, and number 4 on the Digital Albums chart. The single "What I Know" was a free track available for exclusive download on iTunes during release week. On December 4, 2010, Parachute released a video on ESPN and ABC for "Something to Believe In". Kiss Me Slowly was certified Gold by the Recording Industry Association of America on June 30, 2017.

Parachute announced their plans for a third full-length album in late 2012. "Hearts Go Crazy", originally intended as the lead single, was released on iTunes on February 26, 2013 featuring a new electronic direction to the band's sound. A second single, "Can't Help", written by Will Anderson and Ryan Tedder of OneRepublic was released on June 2, 2013. The band also performed "Can't Help" on The Tonight Show with Jay Leno.

On June 13, 2013, the band announced that their third album would be called Overnight, and was released on August 13, 2013. The band promoted "Can't Help" to radio stations, later releasing a music video in support of this single. The album continuously topped the iTunes album charts in the top ten during its first day and week of release, reaching the #3 spot. "Overnight" also marked the band's highest chart position, reaching as high as 15 on the US Billboard 200.

In May 2014, Nate McFarland announced on the Parachute Facebook page that he was leaving the band to pursue his MBA at the University of Virginia's Darden School of Business.

On May 12, 2015, the band debuted their new song "Crave".

On January 24, 2016, Billboard magazine featured the band's new single "Without You" from their fourth album, Wide Awake. The album was released on March 11, 2016 and reached number one on the iTunes Pop chart and number two overall, and has garnered over 50 million Spotify listens to date.

=== Tours ===
Parachute opened for The Script on their first tour of the United States in August 2009. They then toured North America alongside Kelly Clarkson between October and December 2009, opening on October 6 in New York City at the Hammerstein Ballroom and making stops in Chicago, Las Vegas and Seattle. In January 2010, Parachute embarked on another three-week string of performances, sharing the stage with alternative rock band SafetySuit.

From February to March 2010, Parachute rejoined Clarkson for the European leg of her All I Ever Wanted Tour, where they performed for the first time across the United Kingdom, Ireland, Germany, The Netherlands and Denmark. Their experience abroad prompted Parachute to sign on for more dates in the UK later on that May. In the fall of 2010, the band headlined their US tour with singer-songwriter Joe Brooks and pop rock outfit Hot Chelle Rae as support acts. In the spring of 2011, Parachute went on tour opening for the Plain White T's.

After the release of The Way It Was, Parachute toured alongside Michelle Branch and the Goo Goo Dolls throughout the summer of 2011, playing at major arenas and amphitheaters. They continued to tour with a co-headlining run with Kate Voegele. In the summer of 2012, Parachute toured with the band The Cab. In the fall of 2012, Parachute toured with The All-American Rejects and Boys Like Girls. In the fall of 2013, Parachute headlined a tour with opener Matt Hires. During the spring of 2013, Parachute toured with Andy Grammer.

In the summer of 2013, the band embarked on a nationwide headlining tour, including 32 dates, in support of their new album Overnight, the majority of which were sell-out shows. Parachute completed a fifteen stop, national headlining tour in November 2013, this time co-headlining with The Plain White T's. Since touring with The Plain White T's, Parachute continued their Overnight tour by opening shows for Gavin DeGraw and band Needtobreathe in 2014. They headlined a two-month tour called "Meant to Be" named after one of their songs on their latest album, Overnight.

In the Spring of 2015, they joined Mat Kearney and Judah & the Lion on Kearney's "Just Kids (album)" tour. During the summer of 2015, Parachute toured acoustically on their "Stripped" tour.

On March 26, 2016, they kicked off the first leg of their headlining tour, The Wide Awake Tour, in their hometown of Charlottesville, Virginia in support of their fourth album, Wide Awake. The band also embarked on a second leg of the tour over the summer of 2016, starting and ending in July. In October and November 2016, Parachute was one of three openers for Needtobreathe on their Fall 2016 tour Tour De Compadres.

In the spring of 2017, the band headlined once again on The Getaway Tour, with opener Kris Allen. The tour began in Dallas on April 2, and it ended in Nashville on April 27, 2017. Since then the group has embarked on individual endeavours focused on spiritual enlightenment, with frontrunner Will Anderson primarily focusing on family life.

In the summer of 2026, Parachute announced a limited fall 2026 tour to celebrate the 15th anniversary of their sophomore album, The Way It Was, which also marks the vinyl debut for the record. Former members Nate McFarland and Alex Hargrave rejoined them.

== Discography ==
=== Studio albums ===
Title	Album details	Peak chart positions		
Title	Album details	US	US Digital	US Rock
Losing Sleep	Released: May 19, 2009; Label: Island Def Jam Music Group; Formats: CD, digital download	40	2	—
The Way It Was	Released: May 17, 2011; Label: Island Def Jam Music Group; Formats: CD, digital download	19	4	7
Overnight	Released: August 13, 2013; Label: Mercury; Formats: CD, digital download	15	7	—
Wide Awake	Released: March 11, 2016; Label: Vanguard; Formats: CD, digital download	48	—	—
Parachute	Released: May 10, 2019; Label: Parachute; Formats: CD, digital download, Vinyl	—	—	—
"–" denotes album that did not chart.

=== EPs ===
Year	Title
2002	Live from the Recording Studio (1,000 copies printed)
2005	One Small Step (2,000 copies printed)
2007	Sparky's Flaw EP
2009	Winterlove EP
2014	Live from Minneapolis

=== Singles ===
Title	Year	Peak chart positions					Certifications	Album
Title	Year	US	US Adult	US Adult Pop	US Rock Digital	JAP	Certifications	Album
"She Is Love"	2009	66	17	14	—	37	RIAA: Platinum	Losing Sleep
"Under Control"	2009	—	—	27	—	—		Losing Sleep
"Something to Believe In"	2011	—	—	14	34	—		The Way It Was
"Kiss Me Slowly"	2011	111	—	20	10	—	RIAA: Gold	The Way It Was
"You and Me"	2011	—	—	—	37	—		The Way It Was
"Can't Help"	2013	—	—	21	—	—		Overnight
"Without You"	2016	—	—	—	—	—		Wide Awake
"What Side of Love"	2016	—	—	—	—	—		Wide Awake
"Young"	2019	—	—	—	—	—		Parachute
