= Hullabahoos =

The Hullabahoos
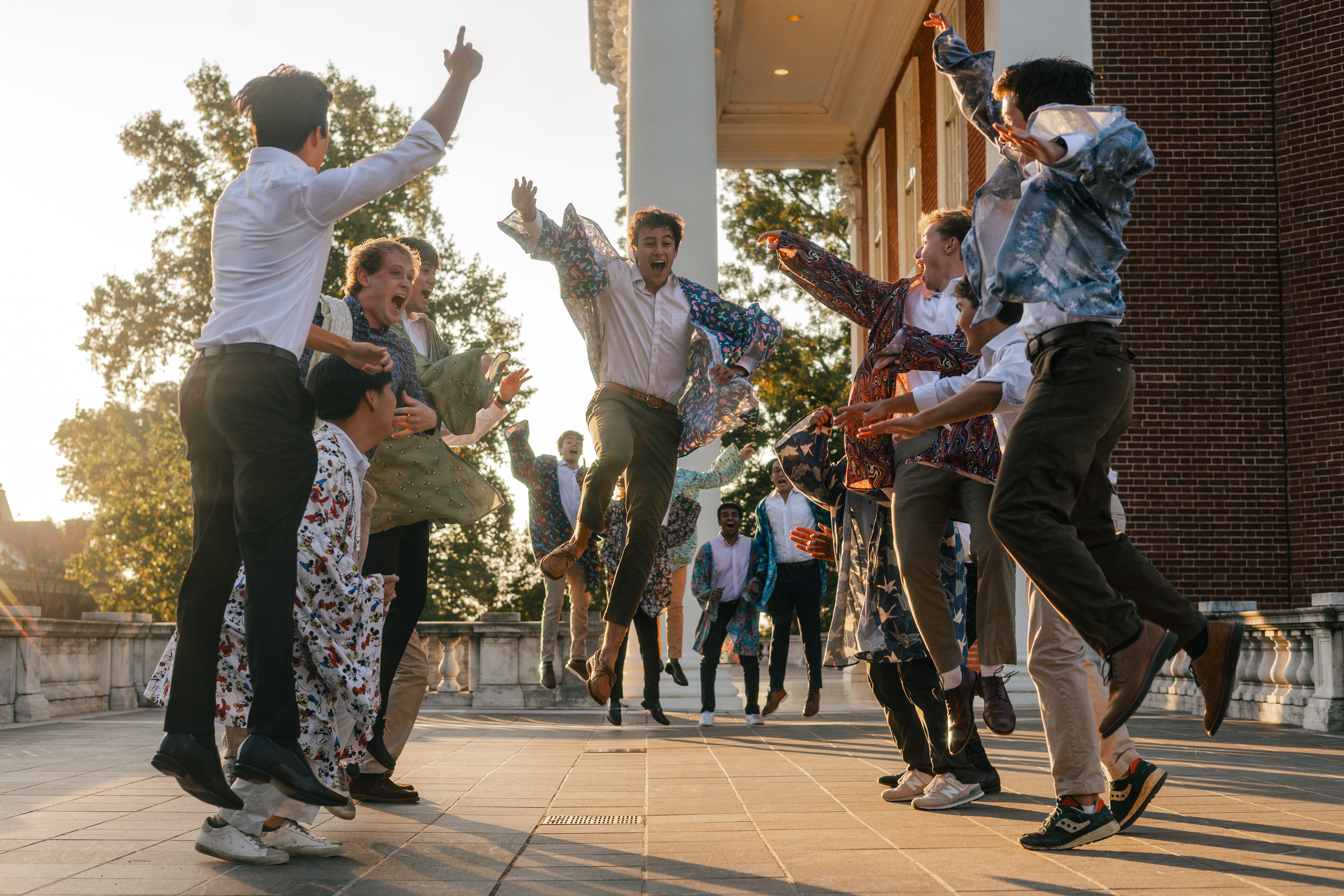
- The 2024-2025 Hullabahoos

Background information
- Origin: University of Virginia
- Genres: A Cappella
- Years active: 1987–present
- Website: hullabahoos.com

The Hullabahoos are a student-run, all-male a cappella group at the University of Virginia. The group was founded in 1987 by Halsted Sullivan and recorded its 24th studio album in 2024. They have appeared as the fictional group "Here Comes Treble" on an episode of NBC's The Office, were featured in the 2012 blockbuster film Pitch Perfect, and have performed at events like the 2004 Republican National Convention, Washington Nationals baseball games, Good Morning America, in the Philippines, weddings, and private parties. Other performance requests have included invitations from the White House, the Kennedy Center, and NBC's The Today Show.

== History ==
Originally friends, the group was founded on December 8, 1987 at the University of Virginia. As an a cappella group, their performances and recordings are produced with no instrumental aid, and they are seen wearing robes while performing. The group's history has taken them around the world and allowed them to record several studio albums in what they refer to on their album inserts as "Hullabasound".

The Hullabahoos typically have 13 to 18 members, although this figure varies from year to year. Auditions for newcomers are held every fall and occasionally in the spring.

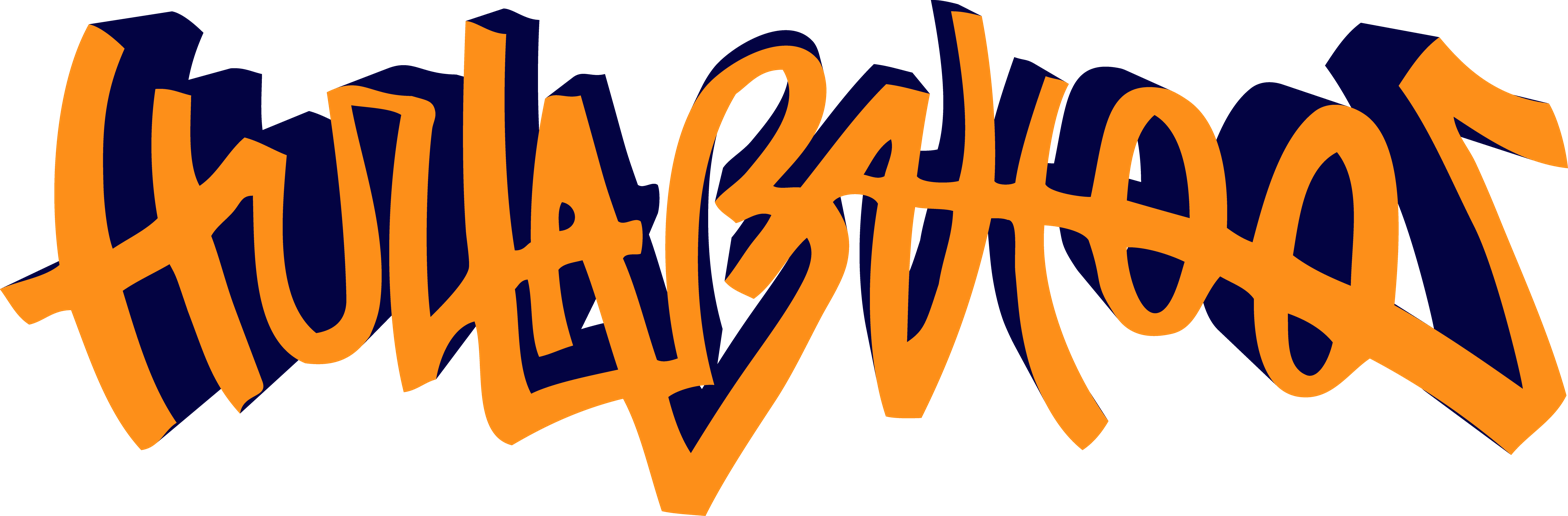
The Hullabahoos logo

The current Hullabahoos logo was drawn in fall 2003 by Morgan Anderson, a student at Williams College, to promote the Hullabahoos' visit to her college. The poster was later scanned into a computer and emailed from a girlfriend in Massachusetts to her boyfriend in Virginia, and it slowly crept its way on to more and more Hullabahoos' paraphernalia, gradually overtaking the traditional but less distinctive Uppercase H logo.

=== Fall Roll ===
In addition to concert performances and other similar gigs, the Hullabahoos typically reserve their fall break weekend at the University of Virginia for a road trip known as Fall Roll. The tour typically covers the East Coast, stopping and performing at various colleges (e.g. University of Pennsylvania, Duke University, University of North Carolina) along the way.

=== Album Production ===
The Hullabahoos released their first studio album, Full Glottal Stop, in 1991, and spent the majority of their early album-making career recording with the accomplished sound engineer Paul Brier, formerly of Virginia Arts Recording Studios in Charlottesville, Virginia. However, with the release in 2004 of Jacked, the Hullabahoos began to use to a new sound engineer/producer, Dave Sperandio of Diovoce, hiring him to handle the album's final mixes and mastering. Sperandio, with his proficiency in hip-hop and pop type production, quickly built a solid reputation in the a cappella world, and his work has been commended by the Recorded A Cappella Review Board (RARB). With the Hullabahoos' 13th CD release, the a cappella producer and UVA alumnus, James Gammon, of James Gammon Productions, was added to the production team, carrying out almost all of the Hullabahoos' production. Gammon most recently worked with the group to record, mix, and master their 24th studio album, Washed Up, which the producer proclaimed as the group's "best work."

=== Robes ===
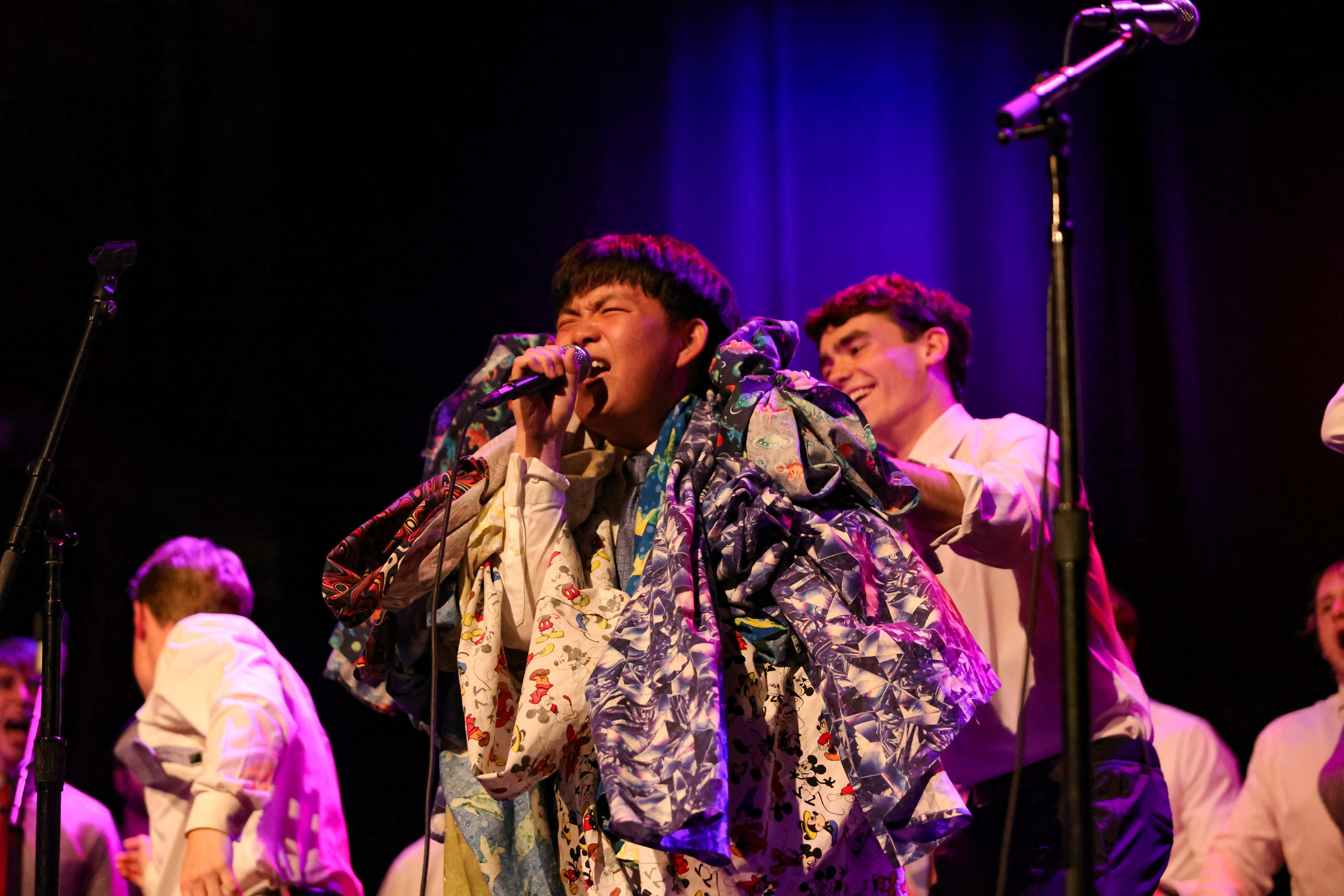
Caleb Park (Class of '27) sings with multiple robes symbolically placed on him.

The Hullabahoos were not the first all-male a cappella group at the University of Virginia. The Virginia Gentlemen were founded in 1953. Historically, the Virginia Gentlemen wear tuxedos or coats and bowties whenever they perform. When the Hullabahoos were formed, they decided to differentiate themselves with a more laid-back style by adopting the use of uniquely patterned robes that have been noted to resemble the official garb of the Eli Banana, one of the many Secret Societies at the University of Virginia. In 2024, three of the group's active members were also members of the university's IMP Society.

Each member picks out their desired robe pattern from fabrics at Joann Fabrics in Charlottesville. This gives the group a sense of relaxed individuality and swagger, making the Hullabahoos stand out amongst the more typical glee club-style college groups like the Virginia Gentlemen.

== Pitch Perfect: The Quest for Collegiate A Cappella Glory ==
New York-based writer Mickey Rapkin followed the Hullabahoos in 2006 and 2007 and profiled the group in his book, Pitch Perfect: The Quest for Collegiate A Cappella Glory. This "behind-the-scenes look at the bizarre, inspiring, and hilarious world of competitive collegiate a cappella" was published on May 29, 2008, by Gotham Books.

The group makes an appearance in the film adaptation, Pitch Perfect, released in 2012. They appear during the ICCA Finals as a participating group performing "The Final Countdown".

== Discography ==
- Full Glottal Stop (1991)
- Baby Fishmouth (1993)
- Free Doughnuts (1994)
- Get on the Glide (1996)
- You'd be Surprised How Well it Fits (1997)
- Unit, Corps, God, Country, Hullabahoos (1998)
- Hurricane (1999)
- 8ch (2000)
- Xerox Nation (2001)
- You Don't Know Me (2002)
- XV - The Essential Other People's Songs Without Instruments (2003)
- Jacked (2004)
- Off The Dock (2006)
- Varsity Sing Team (2007)
- Better Than Coal: A Hullabahoos Christmas (2007)
- XX-Dos Equis (2008)
- Evicted (2009)
- Morning Warriors (2012)
- Open House (2014)
- Rooftop Jukebox (2016)
- Derobed (2018)
- All Aboard (2022)
- Washed Up (2024)

== Awards and recognition ==
=== CARA wins and nominations ===
- 2002: Best Male Collegiate Album Award for Xerox Nation; Best Male Collegiate Solo Runner-Up for Jeff Hall (Class of '01) on "All Out of Love"; Best Male Collegiate Song Nomination for "Everything You Want"
- 2003: Best Male Collegiate Song Award for "Melt With You"
- 2005: Best Male Collegiate Album Nomination for Jacked; Best Male Collegiate Solo Nomination for Russell Bloodworth (Class of '05) on "Cry Me a River"; Best Male Collegiate Song Award for "Cry Me a River"
- 2008: Best Holiday Album Nomination for "Better than Coal: A Hullabahoos Christmas"; Best Holiday Song Nomination for "God Rest Ye Merry Gentlemen"; Best Male Collegiate Album Nomination for "Varsity Sing Team"
- 2019: Best Male Collegiate Solo Runner-Up for Avi Montañez (Class of '18) on "Can I Be Him"
- 2023: Best Rock Album or EP for All Aboard; Best Lower Voices Collegiate Solo Runner-Up for Jalon Daniels (Class of '21) on "Youngblood"
- 2025: Best Lower Voices Collegiate Video Nomination for "There's Nothing Holdin' Me Back"; Best Country Song Runner-Up for "Something in the Orange"

=== Albums selected as "Top Picks" / "Honorable Mentions" by the RARB ===
- 2001: Xerox Nation selected as "Top Pick"
- 2002: You Don't Know Me given "Honorable Mention"
- 2004: Jacked given "Honorable Mention"

=== Album tracks selected for BOCA ===
- 1996: "What You Won't Do For Love" selected for BOCA Vol. 2
- 1998: "Hands to Heaven" selected for BOCA 1998
- 1999: "You Make Me Wanna" selected for BOCA 1999
- 2005: "Hey Ya" selected for BOCA 2005
- 2006: "Save a Horse" selected for BOCA 2006
- 2013: "Something to Believe In" selected for BOCA 2013
- 2015: "Sweater Weather" selected for BOCA 2015
- 2025: "Something in the Orange" selected for BOCA 2025

=== Album tracks selected for Voices Only ===
- 2005: "Cry Me a River" selected for Voices Only 2005
- 2010: "You Found Me" selected for Voices Only 2010
- 2012: "Best Love Song" selected for Voices Only 2012
- 2024: "Marry You" selected for Voices Only 2024

=== Album tracks selected for Spotify's "All A Cappella" ===
- 2012: "The Final Countdown"
- 2023: "Jealous"
