= Sil'hooettes =

The Virginia Sil'hooettes
- Also known as: The Sils
- Origin: University of Virginia: Charlottesville, Virginia, United States
- Genres: A cappella, collegiate a cappella
- Years active: 1989–present
- Labels: Collegiate
- Website: Official site

The Virginia Sil'hooettes are a student-run, all-female identifying a cappella group at the University of Virginia in Charlottesville, Virginia, United States. They have performed for thousands of people at venues including the Kennedy Center, The White House, John Paul Jones Arena, Baltimore Orioles home baseball games, and Boston Red Sox home baseball games.

== History ==
The Sil'hooettes was formed in 1989.

The Sil'hooettes typically range between 9 and 18 members, though the exact number varies from year to year. The group holds auditions for new members every fall and occasionally in the spring. The group posts relevant information regarding auditions to their website as auditions approach.

On October 1, 2012, USA Today named the Virginia Sil'hooettes one of the Top 5 Collegiate A Cappella groups in the country.

On November 18, 2013, HerCampus named the Virginia Sil'hooettes the #1 Female Collegiate A Cappella group in the country.

On February 2, 2016, CollegeMagazine named the Virginia Sil'hooettes the #1 "Female Group Running the A Cappella World".

=== Concerts ===
Every semester, the Sil'hooettes host at least one concert performance, usually held at the University of Virginia's McLeod Hall on a Friday or Saturday evening. The Sils' official website posts relevant information and online ticket sales as the date of the concerts approach. Every five years, the Sil'hooettes host an anniversary concert, inviting the Sil'unnae back to Grounds to celebrate the group's milestone. The Sils celebrated their 35th anniversary in April 2024.

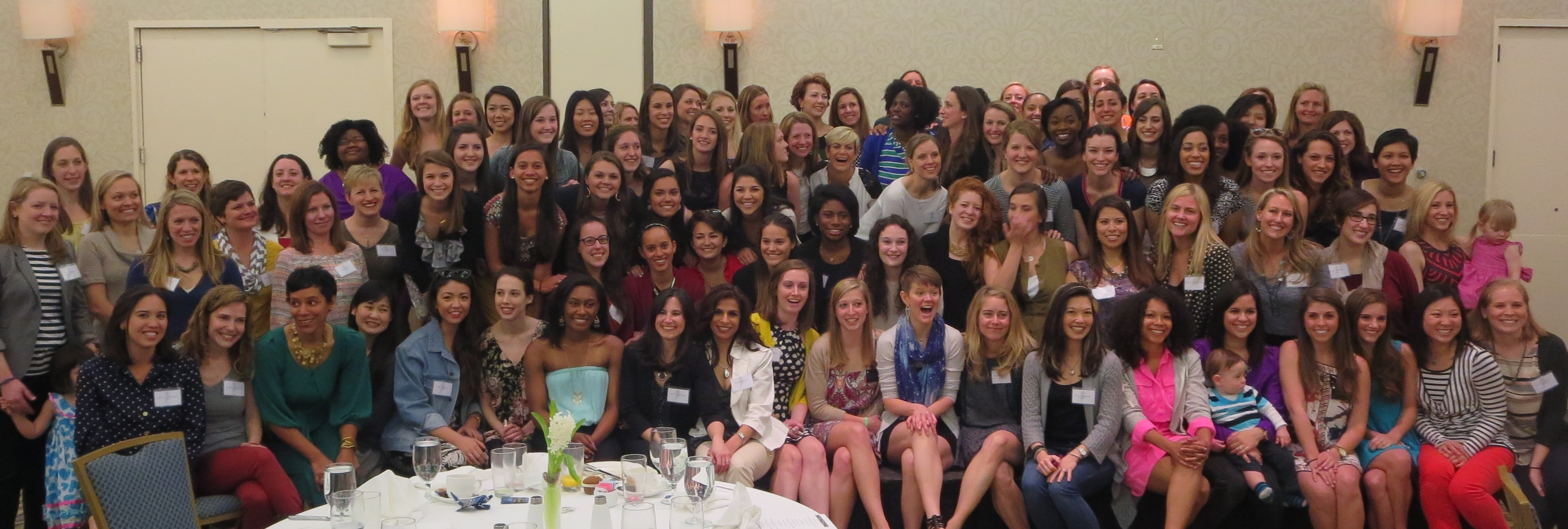
The Sils celebrating 25 years of existence

Sil'hooettes of past and present at the 20th Anniversary Brunch at Boar's Head Inn

=== Albums ===
The Sil'hooettes produce a new studio album approximately every three semesters. Their most recent album, LYLAS: Love You Like A Sil, produced by James Gammon, was released in Fall of 2023. It received a CARA award for Best Upper Voices Collegiate Album and a BOCA 2024 feature.

== Awards and honors ==
Virginia Sil'hooettes awards and nominations
Awards and nominations
Award	Wins	Nominations
ACAs	2	9
CARAs	19	30
RARB	2	-
BOCA	7	-
CAMO	1	-
sing	3	-
Voices Only	7	-
ICCAs	2	-

Totals (Note: Certain award groups do not simply award one winner. They acknowledge several different recipients, have runners-up, and have third place. Since this is a specific recognition and is different from losing an award, runner-up mentions are considered wins in this award tally. For simplification and to avoid errors, each award in this list has been presumed to have had a prior nomination.)
- Wins: 43
- Nominations: 40

=== Musical awards ===
A Cappella Community Awards (ACAs)

Year	Nominee / work	Award	Result
2011	Virginia Sil'hooettes	Favorite Female Collegiate Group (Runner-Up)	Won
2011	"Beautiful Child" by Rufus Wainwright	Favorite Gender-Bender Song/Solo	Nominated
2011	"Telephone" by Lady Gaga ft. Beyoncé	Favorite Lady Gaga Cover (Runner-Up)	Won
2010	Virginia Sil'hooettes	Favorite Female Collegiate Group	Nominated
2010	Take It To The Bridge	Favorite Collegiate Album	Nominated
2010	"Wreckless Love" by Alicia Keys	Favorite Female Vocalist—Happiness Chijioke	Nominated
2010	Sara Dougadir	Favorite Arranger	Nominated
2010	"Wreckless Love" by Alicia Keys	Favorite A Cappella Song	Nominated
2010	"Redemption Song" by Bob Marley	Favorite Gender-Bender Song/Solo	Nominated

Contemporary A Cappella Recording Awards (CARAs)

Year	Nominee / work	Award	Result
2019	Silver Hour	Best Female Collegiate Album (Runner-Up)	Won
2019	"Make Me Feel/Kiss" by Janelle Monáe/Prince	Best Female Collegiate Arrangement—Molly Murphy (Runner-Up)	Won
2018	From the Depths	Best Pop Album	Nominated
2018	From the Depths	Best Female Collegiate Album	Won
2018	"Don't Let Me Down" by The Chainsmokers	Best Female Collegiate Song	Won
2018	"Black Water Lilies" by AURORA	Best Female Collegiate Arrangement—Sarah Donnelly	Won
2018	"River" by Bishop Briggs	Best Female Collegiate Soloist—Emily Dietz	Won
2016	Luster	Best Female Collegiate Album	Won
2016	"I Will Never Die" by Delta Rae	Best Female Collegiate Song	Nominated
2016	"Wait It Out" by Imogen Heap	Best Female Collegiate Arrangement—Alex Peterson	Nominated
2016	"I Will Never Die" by Delta Rae	Best Female Collegiate Soloist—Sophie Maus	Nominated
2015	1989	Best Female Collegiate Album	Nominated
2015	"This Is What It Feels Like" by BANKS	Best Female Collegiate Song	Nominated
2015	"Creep" by Radiohead	Best Female Collegiate Soloist—Stephanie Lee	Nominated
2013	Playing With Lightning	Best Female Collegiate Album	Won
2013	"Around Us" by Jónsi	Best Female Collegiate Song	Won
2013	"Howl" by Florence and the Machine	Best Female Collegiate Arrangement—Liz Smith	Nominated
2013	"Mama" by Beth Hart	Best Female Collegiate Soloist—Happiness Chijioke	Won
2011	Blackout	Best Female Collegiate Album (Runner-Up)	Won
2011	"I See You" by Leona Lewis	Best Female Collegiate Song	Won
2011	"Beautiful Child" by Rufus Wainwright	Best Female Collegiate Arrangement—Caitlin Morton	Won
2010	Take It To The Bridge	Best Female Collegiate Album (Runner-Up)	Won
2010	"1234 (Van She Tech Remix)" by Feist	Best Female Collegiate Song (Runner-Up)	Won
2010	"Wreckless Love" by Alicia Keys	Best Female Collegiate Soloist—Happiness Chijioke	Won
2010	"Wreckless Love" by Alicia Keys	Best Hip-Hop/R&B Song	Nominated
2010	Take It To The Bridge	Best Female Collegiate Album Short List	Won
2008	Sauce	Best Female Collegiate Album	Nominated
2008	"Slow Me Down" by Emmy Rossum	Best Female Collegiate Arrangement—Sara Dougadir	Won
2008	"Butterflies and Hurricanes" by Muse	Best Female Collegiate Song (Runner-Up)	Won
2008	"Careful What You Wish for" by Jonatha Brooke	Best Female Collegiate Soloist—Jenna Pastuszek	Nominated
2008	"Dance With Me" by Lexi Witman	Best Scholastic Original	Nominated
2007	To Homer and Back	Best Female Collegiate Album	Nominated
2007	"They" by Jem	Best Female Collegiate Song	Nominated
2007	"A Broken Wing" by Martina McBride	Best Female Collegiate Soloist—Anne Foster	Won
2005	Tangled	Best Female Collegiate Album	Won
2005	"Beautiful Day" by U2	Best Female Collegiate Arrangement—Blaire Reinhard	Won
2005	"Where Would You Be" by Martina McBride	Best Female Collegiate Soloist (Runner-Up)—Anne Foster	Won
2005	Aftershock	Best Female Collegiate Album (Runner-Up)	Won
2005	"Wrong Impression" by Natalie Imbruglia	Best Female Collegiate Arrangement—Summerlyn Lotz	Nominated
2005	"Wrong Impression" by Natalie Imbruglia	Best Female Collegiate Song (Runner-Up)	Won
2005	"Two Satellites" by Mary Beth Maziarz	Best Female Collegiate Soloist (Runner-Up)—Melody Akhavan	Won
2001	"Snow on the Sahara" by Anggun	Best Female Collegiate Song (Runner-Up)	Won

Recorded A Cappella Review Board (RARB)

Year	Nominee / work	Award	Result
2014	"This Is What It Feels Like" by Banks	2014 Track of the Year	Won
2014	1989	2014 Album Pick of the Year—Honorable Mention	Won
2012	Playing With Lightning	2012 Album Pick of the Year—Honorable Mention	Won
2009	Take It To The Bridge	2009 Album Pick of the Year	Won

=== Selection for "best of" compilation albums ===
Best of College A Cappella (BOCA)

Year	Nominee / work	Award	Result
2018	"Until the Levee" by Joy Williams	BOCA 2018: Best of College A Cappella	Won
2016	"My Gun" by Tove Lo	BOCA 2016: Best of College A Cappella	Won
2014	"Idioteque" by Radiohead	Best of BOCA: The First 20 Years	Won
2012	"Idioteque" by Radiohead	BOCA 2012: Best of College A Cappella	Won
2011	"Telephone” by Lady Gaga ft. Beyoncé	BOCA 2011: Best of College A Cappella	Won
2010	"Say (All I Need)" by OneRepublic	BOCA 2010: Best of College A Cappella	Won
2008	"You'll Think of Me" by Keith Urban	BOCA 2008: Best of College A Cappella	Won
2005	"Where Would You Be" by Martina McBride	BOCA 2005: Best of College A Cappella	Won
2003	"Wrong Impression" by Natalie Imbruglia	BOCA 2003: Best of College A Cappella	Won

Contemporary A Cappella Music Organization (CAMO)

Year	Nominee / work	Award	Result
2005	"Devils and Angels" by Toby Lightman	Top Shelf A Cappella 2005	Won

sing

Year	Nominee / work	Award	Result
2014	"This Is What It Feels Like" by BANKS	sing 11: One Louder	Won
2012	"Around Us" by Jónsi	sing IX: Supernovem	Won
2009	"Wreckless Love" by Alicia Keys"	sing VI: sunny side up	Won

Voices Only

Year	Nominee / work	Award	Result
2017	"Black Water Lilies" by AURORA	Voices Only 2017	Won
2016	"Echo" by VÉRITÉ	Voices Only 2016	Won
2015	"This Is What It Feels Like" by BANKS	Voices Only 2015	Won
2013	"Starry Eyed" by Ellie Goulding	Voices Only 2013	Won
2012	"Around Us" by Jónsi	Voices Only 2012	Won
2011	"Beautiful Child" by Rufus Wainwright	Voices Only 2011	Won
2009	"1234 (Van She Tech Remix)" by Feist	Voices Only 2009	Won
2008	"Butterflies and Hurricanes" by Muse	Voices Only 2008	Won
2006	"Don't Cha Wanna Ride" by Joss Stone	Voices Only 2006	Won
2005	"When I Think About Angels" by Jamie O'Neal	Voices Only 2005	Won

Women's A Cappella Association

Year	Nominee / work	Award	Result
2016	"I Will Never Die" by Delta Rae	WACA Vol. 3	Won
2015	"This Is What It Feels Like" by BANKS	WACA Vol. 2	Won

=== A cappella competitions ===
International Championship of Collegiate A Cappella (ICCAs)

Year	Nominee / work	Award	Result
2003	Virginia Sil'hooettes	ICCA Semi-Finals—3rd Place	Won
2003	Virginia Sil'hooettes	ICCA Regionals—1st Place	Won

== Discography ==
- LYLAS: Love You Like A Sil (2023)
- Tiny Bras (2021)
- Silver Hour (2018)
- From The Depths (2017)
- Luster (2015)
- 1989 (2014)
- Playing with Lightning (2012)
- Blackout (2010)
- Take It To The Bridge (2009)
- Sauce (2008)
- To Homer and Back (2006)
- Tangled (2004)
- Aftershock (2002)
- Flair (2001)
- Delirious (1999)
- Shades of Silver (1998)

== Notable alumni ==
- Blaire Reinhard - musician, the Blaire Reinhard Band
