= Virginia Gentlemen =

American a cappella group

The Virginia Gentlemen
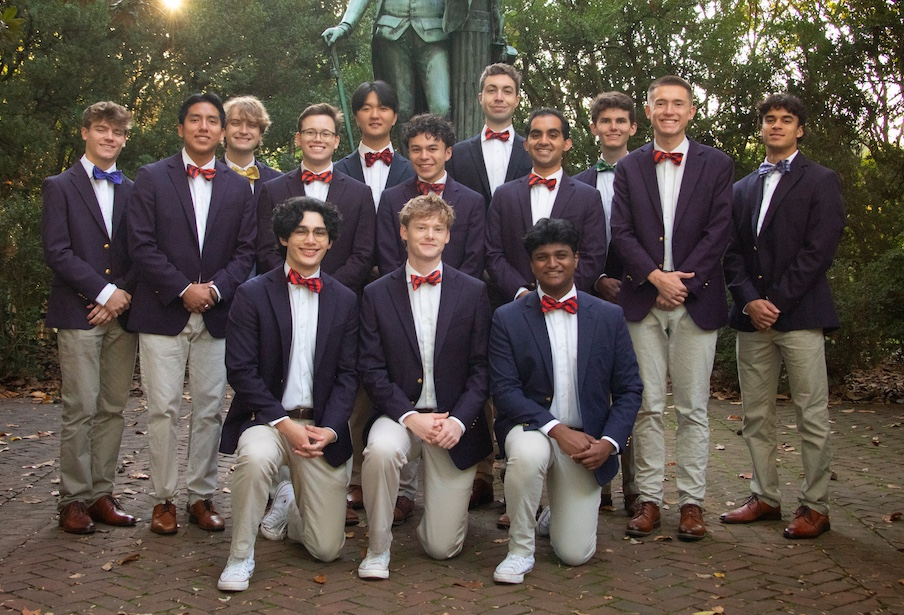
- Group Photo, 2025

Background information
- Also known as: The VGs
- Origin: University of Virginia
- Genre: A Cappella
- Years active: 1953–present
- Label: Collegiate
- Website: Official Site

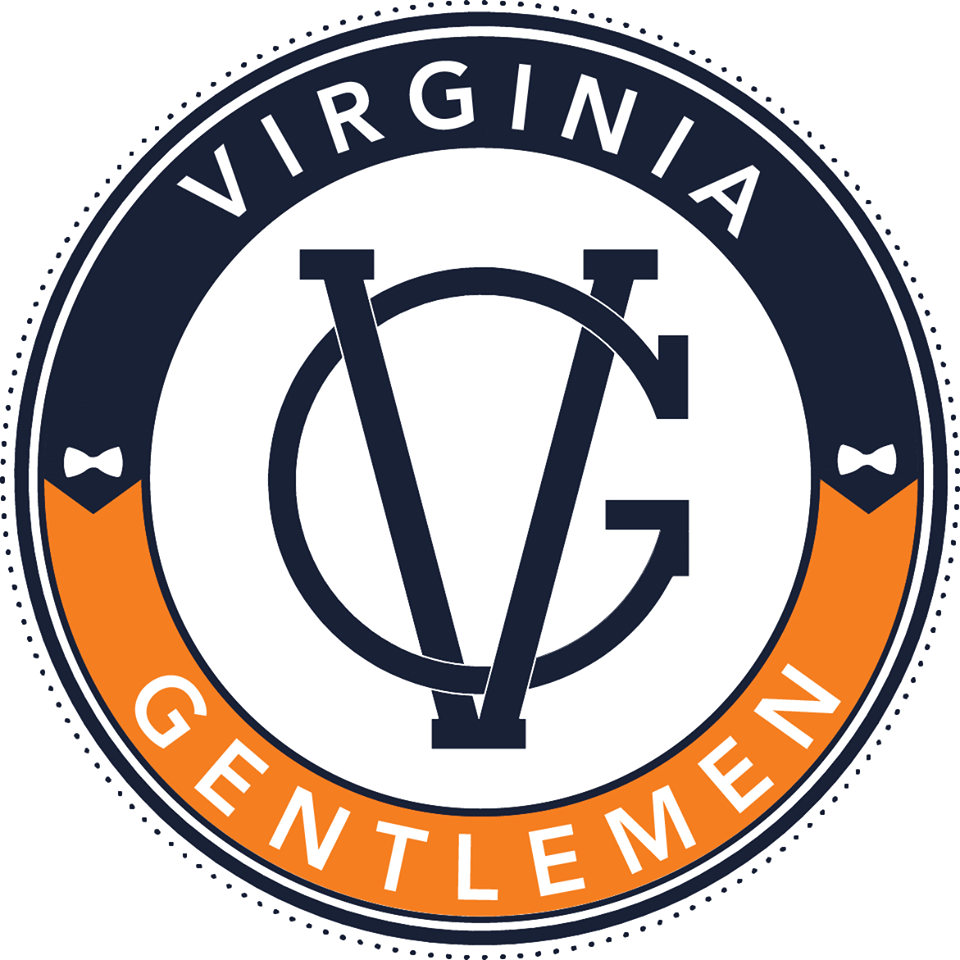
The Virginia Gentlemen logo.

The Virginia Gentlemen (VGs) is a lower voices collegiate a cappella group and the oldest a cappella group at the University of Virginia. The group was founded in 1953 as an elite octet of the Virginia Glee Club. Since establishing independence from the Virginia Glee Club in 1987, the group has continued to perform a mix of contemporary pop and classic vocal music.

Recognizable by the signature navy blue blazers and orange-and-blue bow ties worn during performances, the VGs offer regular performances across the Charlottesville area and the United States, and conduct annual international tours, having most recently traveled to San Miguel de Allende, London, and Paris. Additionally, the group has performed in recent years at the Sydney Opera House, the Forbidden City, the Grand Palace of Thailand, and at the White House for the Bush and Obama administrations.

== About ==
=== Glee Club era and independence ===
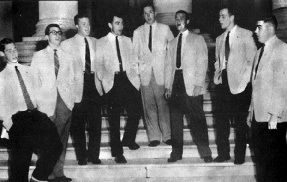
The original 1953 octet of the Virginia Gentlemen.

The Virginia Gentlemen were founded in 1953 and are the oldest a cappella group at the University of Virginia. The group was conceived as an elite octet of the Virginia Glee Club and would perform regularly at their concerts, eventually building enough of a reputation to attract its own audiences and perform its own shows. The group existed for over three decades as a subsidiary of the Glee Club until establishing itself as a contracted independent organization in 1987, under the leadership of then-music director Michael Butterman. Still, the Virginia Gentlemen feature at Glee Club events like their annual Christmas Concert, as a nod to their roots.

=== Modern group ===
Since the VGs' independence from the Virginia Glee Club, much changed with the group, the least of which being the group's membership size. From the Glee Club era size of 8 to 12 members, the group now stands regularly between 13 and 17 members per year. The group's musical tastes changed as well, diverging from the classical and barbershop chorus pieces of the Glee Club era to arrangements of modern pop singles and rock ballads that it performs and records today.

The VGs maintain a close relationship with the University of Virginia and the city of Charlottesville, performing regularly on campus in concerts and for special occasions and memorials, including the vigil for Yeardley Love after her death.

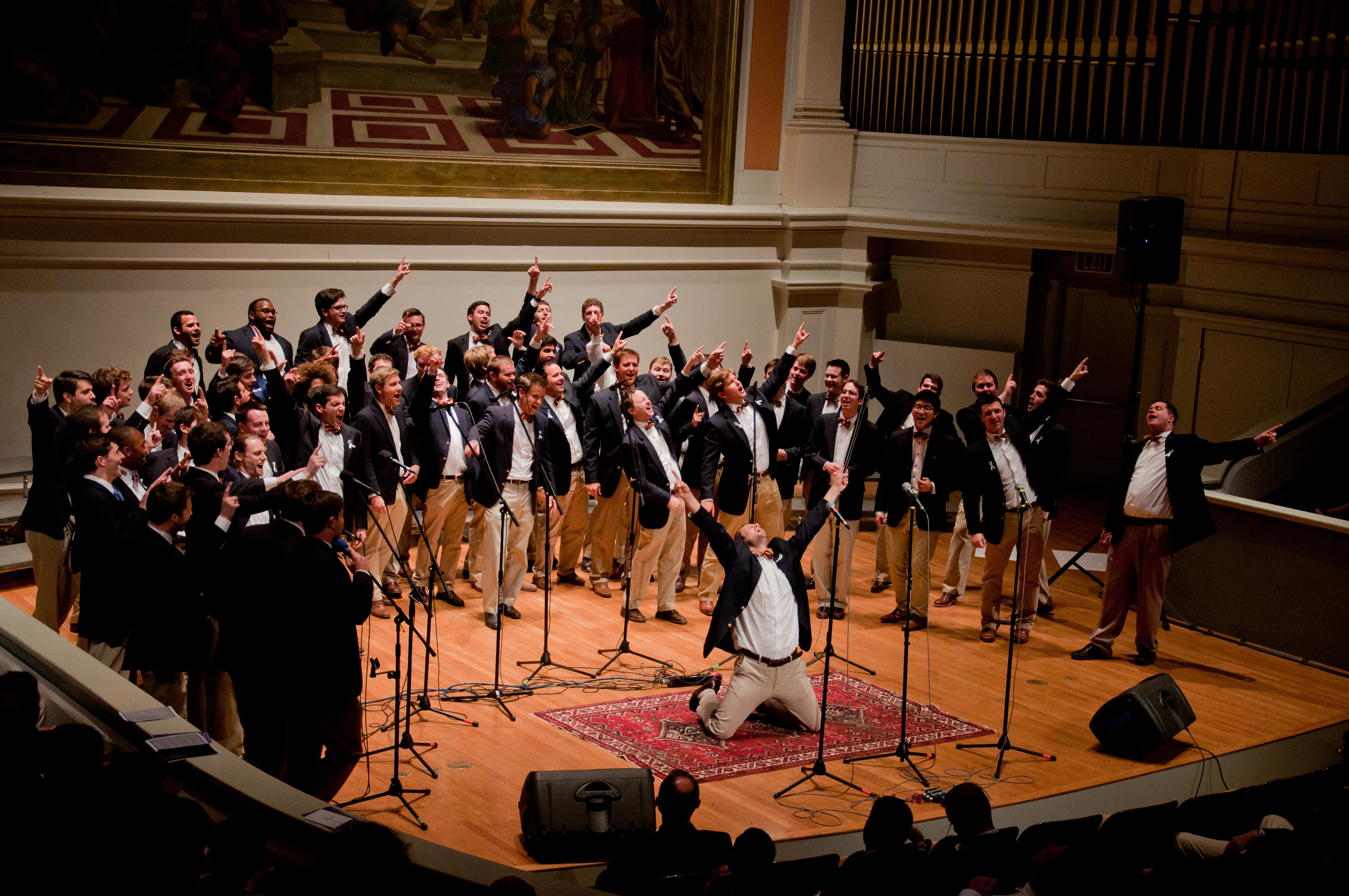
The VGs performing at their 60th Anniversary Concert in April 2013.

The group recorded its first album in 1988 with Live From the Studio and has since released 24 studio albums. The VGs most recent album release was in 2024 with Treehouse. Several Virginia Gentlemen arrangements have been featured on Best of College A Cappella compilations, including their renowned a cappella arrangement of the song "Insomniac" by Billy Pilgrim.

== Activities ==
=== Performances ===
==== Concerts ====
The Virginia Gentlemen annually perform three concerts throughout the year, typically in Old Cabell Hall. The first of these concerts is the Family Weekend Concert held as part of the events organized for the University's Family Weekend in the middle of the Fall semester. The second is the Holiday Concert held in conjunction with the Virginia Sil'hooettes in December, of which the proceeds are annually donated to charity. The third concert of the year is the Spring Concert, held in April.

The VGs also perform annually at the Annual Christmas Concert of the Virginia Glee Club in honor of the two groups' long-standing relationship. Traditionally, when the Glee Club performs "The Twelve Days of Christmas," the eighth day is sung by the VGs, an homage to the original octet which formed out of the Glee Club.

==== At the White House ====
The group has received requests to perform in several prestigious venues, including the White House, at which the group performed in 1991 for George H. W. Bush, in 2008 for George W. Bush, and in 2011, 2012, and 2013 for Barack Obama, including for the 2013 Presidential Inauguration.

=== Annual international tours ===
The group has traveled extensively since its independence, beginning with regular tours around the country and to the Caribbean in the early years of independence. For the last decade and a half, the group has traveled on an annual international tour, most recently visiting San Miguel De Allende, Mexico in January 2026, and London and Paris in March 2026. The Virginia Gentlemen have now traveled to all 7 continents, a feat that has been accomplished by very few performing groups. See their record of travel for more.

== Traditions ==
=== Image and attire ===
The Virginia Gentlemen's standard performance attire consists of khakis, blue blazers, and blue and orange bow ties (the UVA colors), for which members of the group are widely recognized around campus. Indeed, several of the a cappella groups founded at the University of Virginia after the Virginia Gentlemen established their identities in response to the formal look taken by the Virginia Gentlemen at concerts. However, the group does not perform exclusively in "VG attire" but has performed more informally as suited by the occasion.

=== Signature songs ===
Over six decades, the Virginia Gentlemen have arranged and performed hundreds of songs, several of which have become group classics. These songs, performed many times annually and recognized by students at the University of Virginia as VG signatures, include "Insomniac," by Billy Pilgrim, the group's most celebrated and acclaimed arrangement; "On the Turning Away," by Pink Floyd, performed during some of the University's most difficult times; and "Shenandoah," a Glee Club standard carried over from the groups' long history together.

==== "Lonesome Road" ====
The first and last song that each Virginia Gentleman sings during his time in the group is "Lonesome Road", by James Taylor. At the close of each concert, the Virginia Gentlemen invite all past VGs onstage to join in its singing, and it serves as the final song on Gold, the group's 50th Anniversary Album, released in 2003. Though the song is younger than the group, past members of the Virginia Gentlemen have since learned the arrangement and all members past and present perform the song together whenever the occasion arises.

==== "When We Were Young" ====
In 2016, the group debuted its rendition of the famous Adele track, "When We Were Young." The cover was the first of the group's to reach the one million view threshold on YouTube.

== Discography ==
Studio Albums

- Treehouse (2024)
- Pasta Nights (2023)
- Still Dancing (2019)
- Upside Down (2016)
- Full Attire (2014)
- Guys In Ties (2012)
- Rugby Road (2010)
- Holiday Album (2008)
- Poker Face (2006)
- Based On A True Story (2004)
- Gold: 50th Anniversary Compilation Album (2003)
- Turning (2002)
- Bizarro World (2000)
- Last Call (1999)
- Retrospective (1998)
- Out On The Street (1997)
- Void Where Prohibited (1996)
- Seven and Seven (1995)
- Undone (1994)
- XL (1993)
- High Tied (1992)
- Prairie Fire (1991)
- Stop, Drop, and Roll (1990)
- Live From The Studio (1988)

== Awards ==
Virginia Gentlemen awards and nominations
Awards and nominations
Award	Wins	Nominations
CARAs	4	7
BOCA	6	-
Voices Only	2	-

Totals (Note: Certain award groups do not simply award one winner. They acknowledge several different recipients, have runners-up, and have third place. Since this is a specific recognition and is different from losing an award, runner-up mentions are considered wins in this award tally. For simplification and to avoid errors, each award in this list has been presumed to have had a prior nomination.)
- Wins: 12
- Nominations: 7

=== Musical awards ===
Contemporary A Cappella Recording Awards (CARAs)

Year	Nominee / work	Award	Result
2024	"I Can't Make You Love Me" by Bonnie Raitt	Best Country Song	Nominated
2023	Pasta Nights	Best Lower Voices Collegiate Album or EP (Runner-up)	Won
2023	"Tennessee Whiskey" by Chris Stapleton	Best Country Song	Nominated
2023	"Human Nature" by Michael Jackson	Best Lower Voices Collegiate Lead Vocal (Runner-up)	Won
2023	"Human Nature" by Michael Jackson	Best Lower Voices Collegiate Song (Runner-up)	Won
2015	Full Attire	Best Male Collegiate Album	Nominated
2015	"Demons by Imagine Dragons	Best Male Collegiate Song	Nominated
2013	"Colder Weather" by Zac Brown Band	Best Male Collegiate Solo—Andrew Fish	Nominated
1996	Seven and Seven	Best Male Collegiate Album	Nominated
1996	"Insomniac" by Billy Pilgrim	Best Male Collegiate Song	Nominated
1992	Prairie Fire	Best Male Collegiate Album (Runner-Up)	Won

=== Selection for "Best of" compilation albums ===
Best of College A Cappella (BOCA) Archived 2014-12-11 at the Wayback Machine

Year	Nominee / work	Award	Result
2024	"Human Nature" by Michael Jackson	BOCA 2024: Best of Collegiate A Cappella	Won
2015	"Problem" by Ariana Grande	BOCA 2015: Best of College A Cappella	Won
2014	"Insomniac" by Billy Pilgrim	Best of BOCA: The First 20 Years	Won
2013	"Without You" by David Guetta ft. Usher	BOCA 2013: Best of College A Cappella	Won
1996	"Insomniac" by Billy Pilgrim	BOCA Vol. 2: Best of College A Cappella	Won
1995	"Ship of Fools" by Robert Plant	BOCA Vol. 1: Best of College A Cappella	Won

Voices Only

Year	Nominee / work	Award	Result
2025	"One Last Time" by Ariana Grande	Voices Only 2025	Won
2023	"Fire and Rain" by James Taylor	Voices Only 2023	Won
2013	"Holocene" by Bon Iver	Voices Only 2013	Won

=== Record of Travel ===
Year	Destinations
2020	Guatemala, Los Cabos, California
2019	New Zealand to Sydney
2018	San Juan, Portugal, Spain
2018	Newark for TJ Lubinsky’s Doo Wop Generations
2017	United Kingdom to Dublin
2016	Argentina, Antarctica, Falkland Islands, Uruguay
2015	Singapore, Thailand, Cambodia, Vietnam, China, Hong Kong
2014	Peru
2013	Singapore, Thailand, Vietnam, Hong Kong
2012	Hong Kong, Shanghai, Beijing, with President Sullivan
2011	Australia, Komodo Island, Bali, Singapore
2010	Panama, Costa Rica
2009	UAE, Oman, Egypt, Jordan, Turkey, Greece, Italy
2008	Egypt, Athens, Sicily, Spain, Portugal, France, England
2007	Istanbul, Ephesus, Greece, Croatia, Venice
2006	Italy, Croatia, Monaco
2005	Panama, Peru
2004	Singapore, Vietnam, Thailand, Myanmar
2003	Multiple Islands in the Caribbean
2002	Australia, Singapore, Vietnam, Hong Kong
2001	The Amazon
2000	Indonesia, Thailand, Singapore
1999	Panama, Costa Rica, Acapulco
1998	Southern Caribbean
1997	Eastern Caribbean
1996	Western Caribbean
1995	Southern Caribbean
1994	Western Caribbean
1993	Eastern Caribbean
1992	Mexico
1991	Bermuda

== Notable alumni ==
- Will Anderson, lead singer of Parachute (band)
- Bill Bruce, former majority leader of the Tennessee Senate and 1978 U.S. Senate candidate
- Michael Butterman, world-renowned conductor
- Micah Iverson, season 18 finalist on The Voice
- Nate McFarland, former guitarist of Parachute (band)
- Justin Rosolino, singer/songwriter
- Norman Vladimir, pop-soul artist
