= Will Anderson (singer) =

American singer-songwriter (born 1986)

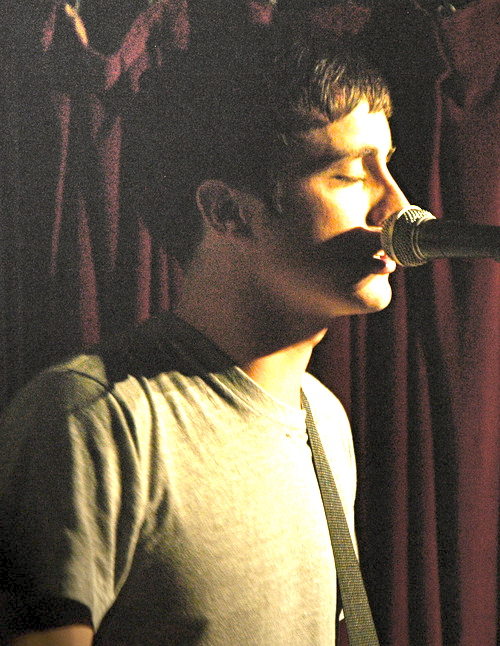
- Will Anderson performing live in Washington D.C., 2014.

Background information
- Born: William Charles Anderson; May 5, 1986 (age 39); Sacramento, California, United States
- Genres: Pop; pop rock
- Occupations: Singer; songwriter
- Instruments: Vocals; guitar; keyboards

William Charles Anderson (born May 5, 1986) is an American singer and songwriter who is best known as the lead vocalist of the American pop rock band Parachute.

== Early life ==
Anderson was born in Sacramento, California but his family later moved to Charlottesville, Virginia. His father, Mark, is a physician and a professor of radiology and orthopaedic surgery at the University of Virginia. He has two brothers, Charles and John, and a sister, Jane. He began taking piano lessons at a young age and his parents bought him his first guitar as a Christmas present when he was eleven years old. He worked as a lifeguard in both high school and college. Anderson graduated from the University of Virginia in 2008, having majored in music.

== Career ==
Anderson formed the band Sparky's Flaw in high school with his classmates Kit French, Johnny Stubblefield, and Alex Hargrave. He met Nate McFarland while studying at the University of Virginia; they were both members of The Virginia Gentlemen. McFarland joined the band as a lead guitarist and Sparky's Flaw released two independent EPs. They later changed their band name to Parachute. Parachute played many college shows and were signed to Mercury Records during Anderson's third year of college in 2007.

Parachute has released five albums since 2009, and has toured with artists including Switchfoot, Kelly Clarkson, NEEDTOBREATHE, Jon McLaughlin, The Script, Mat Kearney, and The Goo Goo Dolls.

On January 22, 2025, Will announced on his Instagram page that he is recording and will be releasing a solo album.

== Influences ==
In his teenage years, Anderson was a fan of Ben Folds Five, John Mayer and Dave Matthews Band: "Honestly, I think Dave Matthews Band is pretty much the reason we all wanted to be in a band. They were huge at the time we were coming together." Tragic Kingdom by No Doubt and Motorcade of Generosity by Cake were the first albums he ever bought. He has named Billy Joel, Paul Simon, Elton John, and Stevie Wonder as his top four songwriting influences, characterizing them as "classic singer-songwriters". He describes Sam Cooke as his favorite singer "of all time".

== Personal life ==
Anderson lived in Nashville, Tennessee in from 2010 to 2016. "Everything here is about music, at least amongst my friends and I. It's fun to be in a place where everybody is thinking about writing ... and just loves talking about it." He owns a Maltese Chihuahua mix named Eddie. In 2017, Anderson married American poet Courtney Kampa. On November 14, 2022, Kampa died in her sleep, at the age of 35. Her cause of death has not been revealed to the public.
