= Fifty-Five Vault =

Compilation album by Ben Folds and Ben Folds Five
- Released: October 11, 2011
- Recorded: 1992–2011
- Genre: Alternative rock
- Length: 3:08:54

Ben Folds and Ben Folds Five chronology
The Best Imitation of Myself: A Retrospective (2011)	Fifty-Five Vault (2011)	The Sound of the Life of the Mind (2012)

Fifty-Five Vault is a Ben Folds compilation album featuring 56 tracks, mostly unreleased live recordings and demos. It was released jointly with The Best Imitation of Myself: A Retrospective as a digital-only album available via Folds' website.

== Track listing ==
+ denotes previously unreleased.

All tracks are written by Ben Folds, unless otherwise noted; all tracks performed by Folds, unless otherwise noted.

No.	Title	Writer(s)	Artist	Length
1.	"Adelaide" (Live in Adelaide 2011+)			3:11
2.	"Air" (from Godzilla: The Album)	Folds, Darren Jessee, Robert Sledge	Ben Folds Five	3:21
3.	"All Shook Up" (Elvis Presley cover) (B-side of "Kate")	Otis Blackwell	Ben Folds Five	1:55
4.	"Ascent of Stan" (Live in New York City 2002+)			4:16
5.	"Birds" (B-side of "Army")		Ben Folds Five	2:09
6.	"Bitch Went Nutz" (Live in Amsterdam 2008+)			4:36
7.	"Bizarre Christmas Incident" (from Maybe This Christmas & 7" vinyl single)			2:23
8.	"Brick" (Live Acoustic Version 2003+)	Folds, Jessee	The Bens	4:50
9.	"Champagne Supernova" (Oasis cover) (Live in London 1996) (B-side of "Battle of Who Could Care Less")	Noel Gallagher	Ben Folds Five	1:34
10.	"Cologne" (Piano Orchestra Version 2008) (from Stems and Seeds)			6:08
11.	"Dr. Yang" (Live in Belgium 2008+)			2:35
12.	"Evaporated" (Demo 1992)		Ben Folds Five	4:11
13.	"Family of Me" (from Over the Hedge)			1:28
14.	"For All the Pretty People" (B-side of "Kate")		Ben Folds Five	3:22
15.	"Free Coffee" (Live in Germany 2008+)			4:05
16.	"Girl" (B-side of "Rockin' the Suburbs")			3:43
17.	"Golden Slumbers" (The Beatles cover) (Live in NYC 2001+)	John Lennon, Paul McCartney		2:13
18.	"Hava Nagila" (Live) (B-side of "Battle of Who Could Care Less")	Abraham Zevi Idelsohn	Ben Folds Five	1:35
19.	"Heist" (from Over the Hedge)			3:01
20.	"Hiro's Song" (Shaker Version) (Live in Melbourne 2011+)			3:02
21.	"Honey Don't" (Carl Perkins cover) (Alternate Take 2000+)	Carl Perkins	Ben Folds Five	2:40
22.	"Hospital Song" (Live in Philadelphia 1999+)		Ben Folds Five	2:22
23.	"House" (Original Mix 2011+)		Ben Folds Five	3:41
24.	"I Knew That Cha Could" (Demo 2000+)			2:50
25.	"In Between Days" (The Cure cover) (Live 2005)	Robert Smith		3:03
26.	"In Love" (Demo 1998+)		Fear of Pop	4:28
27.	"It's Alright with God" (Mitch Easter Sessions 2000+)		Ben Folds Five	7:59
28.	"Jesusland" (Live in Jakarta 2011+)			3:59
29.	"Jesusland" (Stadium Version) (Live in London 2005+)			2:35
30.	"Lonely" (Demo 1996+)		Ben Folds Five	3:18
31.	"Lost in the Supermarket" (The Clash cover) (from Over the Hedge)	Mick Jones, Joe Strummer		3:30
32.	"Make Me Mommy" (B-side of "Rockin' the Suburbs")			2:18
33.	"Mess" (Live in Boston 2007+)		Folds with Neil Hannon	4:03
34.	"Mitchell Lane" (Outtake from Whatever and Ever Amen)		Ben Folds Five	3:44
35.	"Narcolepsy" (Live+)		Ben Folds Five	5:35
36.	"One Down" (B-side of "Rockin' the Suburbs")			4:22
37.	"Prince Charming" (Mitch Easter Sessions 2000+)		Ben Folds Five	3:41
38.	"Prologue" (Outtake from Over the Hedge)			1:09
39.	"Protection" (Demo 1992+)			3:24
40.	"Radio Jingles for Tokyo's Inter-FM"			0:52
41.	"Rockin' the Suburbs" ('06 Remix) (Outtake from Over the Hedge)			3:21
42.	"Say Yes" (Elliott Smith cover) (Live at The A.V. Club 2010+)	Elliott Smith		2:08
43.	"She Don't Use Jelly" (The Flaming Lips cover) (Lounge-A-Palooza Version)	Wayne Coyne	Ben Folds Five	4:12
44.	"Side of the Road" (Lucinda Williams cover) (Alternate Cello Version+)	Lucinda Williams		3:01
45.	"Silver Street" (Demo 1994+)		Ben Folds Five	3:29
46.	"Smoke" (Demo 1994+)	Folds, Anna Goodman	Ben Folds Five	4:22
47.	"Song for the Dumped" (Demo 1996+)	Folds, Jessee	Ben Folds Five	3:51
48.	"Steven's Last Night in Town" (Demo 1996+)		Ben Folds Five	3:06
49.	"Theme from 'Dr. Pyser'" (Studio Version)		Ben Folds Five	3:14
50.	"Underground" (Demo 1992+)		Ben Folds Five	5:06
51.	"Video Killed the Radio Star" (The Buggles cover) (Outtake from Whatever and Ever Amen)	Geoff Downes, Trevor Horn, Bruce Woolley	Ben Folds Five	3:41
52.	"Where's Summer B.?" (Live at WNEW 1996+)	Folds, Jessee	Ben Folds Five	4:14
53.	"Wild Mountain Thyme" (Alternate Take 2010+)	Francis McPeake, Robert Tannahill		2:48
54.	"You to Thank" (Live in Adelaide 2011+)			3:44
55.	"Your Cheatin' Heart" (Hank Williams cover) (Live 1996+)	Hank Williams	Ben Folds Five	1:35
56.	"Your Redneck Past" (Live in London 1999+)		Ben Folds Five	4:16
