= The Best Imitation of Myself: A Retrospective =

Compilation album by Ben Folds and Ben Folds Five
- Released: October 11, 2011
- Genre: Alternative rock
- Label: Legacy Records

Ben Folds and Ben Folds Five chronology
Lonely Avenue (2010)	The Best Imitation of Myself: A Retrospective (2011)	Fifty-Five Vault (2011)

The Best Imitation of Myself: A Retrospective is a compilation album by American singer-songwriter Ben Folds and his alternative rock trio Ben Folds Five, released in the United States of America on October 11, 2011, by Legacy Records. The title comes from a song from their 1995 self-titled debut album.

The standard-edition album contains 17 popular songs from the band's discography and Folds' subsequent solo career, as well as the new Ben Folds Five single "House", which debuted on the website for the NBC competition show The Sing-Off, on which Folds was a judge.

An expanded edition includes 43 additional tracks over three discs, including two more new songs from Ben Folds Five recorded in 2011. Folds also made available through his website the additional album Fifty-Five Vault, a 56-track collection of rarities. A five-track sampler from this album, Free Folds Five, was included with digital copies of The Best Imitation of Myself.

== Track listing ==
=== Disc 1 ===
All tracks are written by Ben Folds, except where noted.

Standard Edition
No.	Title	Lyrics	Length
1.	"Brick (Radio Mix)" (with Ben Folds Five; from "Brick" single, 1998; original from Whatever and Ever Amen, 1997)	Folds, Darren Jessee	4:34
2.	"Annie Waits" (from Rockin' the Suburbs, 2001)		4:17
3.	"Philosophy" (with Ben Folds Five; from Ben Folds Five, 1995)		4:36
4.	"Underground" (with Ben Folds Five; from Ben Folds Five, 1995)		4:11
5.	"Landed (Strings Version)" (from "Landed" digital single, 2005; original from Songs for Silverman, 2005)		4:07
6.	"One Angry Dwarf and 200 Solemn Faces" (with Ben Folds Five; from Whatever and Ever Amen, 1997)		3:52
7.	"Don't Change Your Plans" (with Ben Folds Five; from The Unauthorized Biography of Reinhold Messner, 1999)		5:11
8.	"The Luckiest" (from Rockin' the Suburbs, 2001)		4:24
9.	"Smoke" (with the West Australian Symphony Orchestra, Perth, AU 2005; audio from Ben Folds and WASO Live in Perth DVD, 2005)	Folds, Anna Goodman	5:33
10.	"Rockin' the Suburbs" (from Rockin' the Suburbs, 2001)		5:00
11.	"Kate" (with Ben Folds Five; from Whatever and Ever Amen, 1997)	Folds, Jessee, Goodman	3:14
12.	"Gracie" (from Songs for Silverman, 2005)		2:40
13.	"Still Fighting It (Extended Version)" (original from Rockin' the Suburbs, 2001)		5:06
14.	"You Don't Know Me" (featuring Regina Spektor; from Way to Normal, 2008)		3:12
15.	"There's Always Someone Cooler Than You" (from Supersunnyspeedgraphic, the LP, 2006)		4:11
16.	"Still" (from Over the Hedge: Music from the Motion Picture, 2006)		2:38
17.	"From Above (with Nick Hornby)" (from Lonely Avenue, 2010)	Folds, Hornby	4:04
18.	"House" (with Ben Folds Five, new track – 2011)		3:43

=== Disc 2 ===
Live 1997–2011
No.	Title	Lyrics	Notes	Length
1.	"Julianne"		With Ben Folds Five, recorded at Studion in Stockholm, Sweden on March 12, 1997	2:43
2.	"Video"		With Ben Folds Five, recorded at Studion in Stockholm, Sweden on March 12, 1997	4:03
3.	"Song for The Dumped"	Folds, Jessee	With Ben Folds Five, recorded for Hard Rock Café Live television program on June 12, 1998	5:10
4.	"Missing the War"		With Ben Folds Five, recorded at Royal Albert Hall in London, UK on December 14, 1999	4:35
5.	"Mess"		With Ben Folds Five, recorded at Royal Albert Hall in London, UK on December 14, 1999	4:09
6.	"Magic"	Jessee	With Ben Folds Five, recorded at Royal Albert Hall in London, UK on December 14, 1999	4:11
7.	"Selfless, Cold and Composed"	Folds, Goodman	Recorded at Bowery Ballroom in New York, NY on December 9, 2001	5:07
8.	"Zak and Sara"		Recorded at Roseland Ballroom in New York, NY on June 13, 2002	3:37
9.	"Girl"		Recorded at Roseland Ballroom in New York, NY on June 13, 2002	2:07
10.	"Just Pretend"	Folds, Kweller, Lee	With The Bens, recorded at Palais Theatre in Melbourne, Australia on March 24, 2003	3:09
11.	"Fred Jones Part 2"		With the West Australian Symphony Orchestra, recorded at Kings Park in Perth, Australia on March 12 & 13, 2005; from Ben Folds and WASO Live in Perth DVD, 2005	3:54
12.	"Careless Whisper"	Michael, Ridgeley	George Michael cover, featuring Rufus Wainwright, recorded at Mountain Winery in Saratoga, CA on August 24, 2005	3:37
13.	"All U Can Eat"		Recorded at Ben's Studio in Nashville, TN on October 24, 2006; from Ben Folds Live at MySpace DVD, 2006	3:07
14.	"Long Tall Texan"	Henry Strzelecki	Recorded at the Warehouse in Houston, TX on October 24, 2008	2:11
15.	"Army"		With Ben Folds Five, recorded at UNC Memorial Hall, Chapel Hill on September 18, 2008 for the MySpace "Front to Back" series	3:26
16.	"Battle of Who Could Care Less"		With Ben Folds Five, recorded at UNC Memorial Hall, Chapel Hill on September 18, 2008 for the MySpace "Front to Back" series	3:23
17.	"Kylie from Connecticut"		Recorded at the State Theatre, Detroit, MI on October 9, 2008; from The Sound of Last Night... This Morning, 2009	5:02
18.	"Effington"		Recorded at Ax Hall, Seoul, South Korea on June 9, 2011	3:44
19.	"Picture Window"	Folds, Hornby	Recorded at HMV Hammersmith Apollo in London, UK on February 20, 2011	3:45
20.	"Sentimental Guy"		Recorded at A.E.C. Theatre in Adelaide, Australia on May 22, 2011	3:18
21.	"Not the Same"		Recorded at A.E.C. Theatre in Adelaide, Australia on May 22, 2011	5:38

=== Disc 3 ===
Rarities 1991–2011
No.	Title	Lyrics	Length
1.	"Unrelated" (Unfinished Song Demo – 1996)	Folds, Goodman	0:36
2.	"Best Imitation of Myself" (Demo – 1992)		2:50
3.	"Rocky" (4 Track Home Demo – 1993)		4:28
4.	"Boxing" (Demo – 1992)		4:06
5.	"Julianne" (with Ben Folds Five; unreleased first album – 1994)		3:17
6.	"Evaporated" (with Ben Folds Five; unreleased first album – 1994)		4:19
7.	"Alice Childress" (with Ben Folds Five; KCRW sessions – 1996)	Folds, Goodman	4:23
8.	"Barrytown" (Steely Dan cover, with Ben Folds Five; Me, Myself & Irene soundtrack – 2000)	Donald Fagen, Walter Becker	3:47
9.	"Amelia Bright" (with Ben Folds Five; Mitch Easter sessions – 2000)	Jessee	3:23
10.	"Tell Me What I Did" (with Ben Folds Five, new track – 2011)	Robert Sledge	2:50
11.	"Rock Star" (Demo – 2000)		3:23
12.	"Losing Lisa" (Demo – 2000)	Folds, Frally Hynes	3:38
13.	"Break Up at Food Court" (Demo – 2000)		2:53
14.	"Hiro's Song" (Demo – 2000)		3:37
15.	"Wandering" (Demo – 2000)	Folds, Jessee	4:27
16.	"The Secret Life of Morgan Davis" (Alternate Mix – 2001)		2:42
17.	"Such Great Heights" (The Postal Service cover; alternate mix from MySpace sessions – 2006)	Ben Gibbard, Jimmy Tamborello	4:38
18.	"Bitches Ain't Shit" (Dr. Dre cover)	Daz Dillinger, Dr. Dre, Jewell, Kurupt, Snoop Dogg, The D.O.C.	3:53
19.	"Time" (Alternate Version – 2004)		4:02
20.	"Sleazy" (Kesha cover; Download To Donate: Tsunami Relief – 2011)	Kesha Sebert, Lukasz Gottwald, Benjamin Levin, Shondrae Crawford, Klas Åhlund	3:20
21.	"Because the Origami" (with 8in8 – Ben Folds, Amanda Palmer, Neil Gaiman and Damian Kulash)	Folds, Amanda Palmer, Neil Gaiman, Damian Kulash	4:11
22.	"Stumblin’ Home Winter Blues" (with Ben Folds Five, new track – 2011)	Jessee	2:57

=== Free Folds Five ===
No.	Title	Lyrics	Length
1.	"Underground" (Demo, 1992)		5:05
2.	"Steven's Last Night in Town" (Demo, 1994)		3:06
3.	"Song for the Dumped" (Demo, 1994)	Folds, Jessee	3:51
4.	"Narcolepsy" (with Ben Folds Five; recorded live on 11/21/99, Brussels, Belgium)		5:34
5.	"Dr. Yang" (recorded live on 11/23/08, Leuven, Belgium)		2:35
