= Ben Folds Five – The Complete Sessions at West 54th =

2001 DVD by Ben Folds Five

Video by Ben Folds Five
- Released: November 20, 2001
- Recorded: June 1997
- Genre: Alternative rock
- Length: 1 hour 55 minutes
- Label: Sony
- Producer: Jeb Brien, Alan Wolmark

Ben Folds Five – The Complete Sessions at West 54th, also referred to as Ben Folds Five – Live at Sessions at West 54th, is a DVD containing musical performances by Ben Folds Five. On June 9, 1997 Ben Folds Five was one of the first guests to appear on a new series called Sessions at West 54th. Because of the 1/2 hour time constraint of the show, only a handful of the recorded tracks made it to air. The DVD contains the entire performance which, for the most part, includes tracks from their just released album, Whatever and Ever Amen.

The DVD includes Spare Reels, a 45-minute film which contains live performances and clips of the band in various and random situations. It also contains clips of Ben Folds Five during the studio sessions for their then upcoming album, The Unauthorized Biography of Reinhold Messner.

== Track listing ==
1. "Missing the War"
2. "Kate"
3. "Battle of Who Could Care Less"
4. "The Last Polka"
5. "Selfless, Cold and Composed"
6. "Brick"
7. "Steven's Last Night in Town"
8. "Smoke"
9. "Philosophy"
10. "Emaline"
11. "Theme from 'Dr. Pyser'"
12. "One Angry Dwarf and 200 Solemn Faces"
13. "Underground"
14. "She Don't Use Jelly"
15. "Song for the Dumped"

Bonus Feature: Spare Reels Footage

1. "Battle of Who Could Care Less"
2. "Philosophy"
3. "Missing the War"
4. "Brick"
5. "Jackson Cannery"
6. "Song for the Dumped"
7. "Don't Change Your Plans"
8. "Army"

== Personnel ==
Ben Folds Five

- Ben Folds – vocals, piano, melodica
- Robert Sledge – bass guitar, double bass, background vocals
- Darren Jessee – drums, background vocals

== Production ==
Sessions at West 54th

- Executive Producer: Jeb Brien
- Series Producer: Monica Hardiman
- Producer: Allen Kelman
- Director: Jim Gable

Spare Reels

- Produced and Compiled by [The Jack My Dog Corporation]
- Executive Producer: Alan Wolmark
- Mixed and Recorded by Caleb Southern, John Alagia, Doug Derryberry, Jeff Juliano, Leo Overtoom
