= Uncle Walter (song) =

- Cover of European single

Single by Ben Folds Five

from the album Ben Folds Five
- Released: August 8, 1995 (album); 1996 (single)
- Recorded: Wave Castle, Chapel Hill, North Carolina; February 1995
- Genre: Alternative rock
- Length: 3:49
- Label: Passenger/Caroline; Intercord Records (EU single); Virgin (Australia single)
- Songwriter(s): Benjamin Scott Folds
- Producer(s): Caleb Southern

Ben Folds Five singles chronology
"Philosophy" (1996)	"Uncle Walter" (1995)	"Battle of Who Could Care Less" (1997)

Music video
- "Uncle Walter" on YouTube

"Uncle Walter" is a song from Ben Folds Five's 1995 self-titled debut album. It was written by lead singer Ben Folds.

== History ==
Ben Folds has stated:

[Uncle Walter] was actually based on this woman, the mother of this guy I played in a garage band with, and she was a total absolute drunk. They'd leave to go get a cord or beer or something - I was 14 - and she'd trap me in the corner and just talk, talk, talk. [drunk voice] "If I was President, I would have done this..." She's dead now 'cause she was washing her hair in the bathtub and the bathtub was filling up, and she hit her head on the faucet and she passed out into the tub and drowned. The Uncle Walter I actually have is a nice guy.

Charles Leahy, first cousin of songwriter (and Folds' former wife) Anna Goodman, corroborates this in a June 2006 interview:

Uncle Walter was actually a real, genuine uncle (by marriage) of Anna's mom and my mom. (They're sisters). Uncle Walter had a great log cabin in the mountains of Virginia with an awesome large creek running beside it. He was a farmer from the depression days and a REAL character. Anna's mom and my mom were always telling stories about him and that's where the name comes from. Of course the character in the song is indeed a compilation of characters (including the woman you referenced), but I just wanted to give my great uncle some credit!

== Additional versions ==
This song appears on the Ben Folds Five Live album which was released on June 4, 2013. It was recorded at the Kool Haus, Toronto, Ontario, Canada, 10/5/12.

== Singles ==
=== U.S. promotional CD single ===
Released in 1996 to radio programmers in the United States to promote the song and the album Ben Folds Five. Features the album cut of the song.

1. Uncle Walter – 3:49

=== European commercial CD single ===
Released in 1996 in Europe by Intercord Records for Passenger/Caroline. Features the album cut of the song. The other tracks were recorded live on August 12, 1995, at Ziggy's in Winston-Salem, North Carolina, by John Alagia and Doug Derryberry. The tracks were mixed at Rutabaga Studios in May 1996. "Tom & Mary" also appears on the Japanese release of Ben Folds Five.

1. Uncle Walter – 3:49
2. Tom & Mary (Live) – 2:51
3. Emaline (Live) – 3:40

=== Australian commercial CD single ===
Released on 21 October 1996 in Australia by Virgin Records for Passenger/Caroline. Features the album cut of the song. The other tracks were recorded live on August 12, 1995, at Ziggy's in Winston-Salem, North Carolina, by John Alagia and Doug Derryberry. The tracks were mixed at Rutabaga Studios in May 1996. "Tom & Mary" also appears on the Japanese release of Ben Folds Five.

1. Uncle Walter – 3:49
2. Tom & Mary (Live) – 2:51
3. Emaline (Live) – 3:40

== Compilations and soundtracks ==
The song appears on the 1996 Caroline Records compilation album How Low Can A Punk Get.

== Personnel ==
- Ben Folds – piano, vocals
- Darren Jessee – drums, vocals
- Robert Sledge – bass, vocals

=== Production ===
- Producer: Caleb Southern
- Mixing: Marc Becker
