= Sports & Wine =

Song by Ben Folds Five

from the album Ben Folds Five
- Released: August 8, 1995
- Studio: Wave Castle, Chapel Hill, North Carolina
- Genre: Alternative rock
- Length: 2:58
- Label: Passenger/Caroline
- Songwriter(s): Benjamin Scott Folds
- Producer(s): Caleb Southern

"Sports & Wine" is a song from Ben Folds Five's 1995 self-titled debut album. It was written by Ben Folds. The song is a snide dismissal of a "man's man" who attempts to put up the pretense of being sensitive so that he can appeal more to the opposite sex.

The album version of "Sports & Wine" appears as an additional track on the commercial CD single and the "B" side of the commercial 7" vinyl single of the song "Underground". Both singles were released in the United Kingdom in April 1996 by Vital Distribution for Passenger/Caroline.

== Personnel ==
- Ben Folds – piano, vocals
- Darren Jessee – drums, vocals, sports shouts
- Robert Sledge – bass

=== Production ===
- Producer: Caleb Southern
- Mixing: Marc Becker
