= Ben Folds Live =

Live album by Ben Folds
- Released: October 8, 2002
- Recorded: March 2 – July 6, 2002
- Genre: Alternative rock
- Length: 71:10
- Label: Sony
- Producer: Marc Chevalier, Ben Folds

Ben Folds chronology
Rockin' the Suburbs (2001)	Ben Folds Live (2002)	Speed Graphic (2003)

Professional ratings
Review scores
Source	Rating
Allmusic	3/5 stars
Pitchfork Media	7.1/10
Rolling Stone	3/5 stars
Uncut	4/5 stars

Ben Folds Live is a live album by Ben Folds, released on October 8, 2002. This album marked the first official release of the improvisation, "Rock This Bitch". The song, which changes with every performance, is now a staple of his live performances, with recorded versions also appears on his later albums Songs for Goldfish (under the name "Weather Channel Music") and on the Live in Perth DVD (in which he "rocks this bitch orchestrally" with the West Australian Symphony Orchestra).

This album was made available for a limited time with a bonus DVD. It had 8 tracks, including a video of the audience shooting the front cover (during which they all gave him the finger and yelled "Ben Folds sucks!"). This was also the first appearance of the altered, minor-key version of the Ben Folds Five song "Song for the Dumped" on an official release. This version also includes Darren Jessee's "missing lyrics" ("You fucking whore" repeated a few times).

The Japanese release of the album included a live version of "Eddie Walker" and the studio recording of "Bizarre Christmas Incident". The 'L' in "Live" on the front cover is actually an upside-down 'F', as though it used to say "Ben Folds Five", the name of Ben's group before he began his solo career.

The cover of the album was taken June 8, 2002 by David Leyes at Avalon in Boston, MA during the "Ben Folds and a Piano" tour. The album cover depicts everyone in the crowd giving Ben the middle finger. However, in certain regions, the fingers are edited out of the photo.

== Track listing ==
All tracks are written by Ben Folds, unless otherwise noted.

No.	Title	Writer(s)	Length
1.	"One Angry Dwarf and 200 Solemn Faces"		4:17
2.	"Zak and Sara"		3:24
3.	"Silver Street"		3:41
4.	"Best Imitation of Myself"		3:13
5.	"Not the Same"		4:31
6.	"Jane"		2:34
7.	"One Down"		4:03
8.	"Fred Jones Part 2"		4:39
9.	"Brick"	Folds; Darren Jessee	4:45
10.	"Narcolepsy"		6:04
11.	"Army"		3:41
12.	"The Last Polka"	Folds; Anna Goodman	3:55
13.	"Tiny Dancer"	Elton John; Bernie Taupin	5:23
14.	"Rock This Bitch"		1:17
15.	"Philosophy" (Inc Misirlou)		7:16
16.	"The Luckiest"		4:39
17.	"Emaline"	Folds; Evan Olson	3:48
Total length:			71:10

Japanese bonus tracks
No.	Title	Length
18.	"Eddie Walker" (live)	3:25
19.	"Bizarre Christmas Incident" (studio)	2:25
Total length:		77:00

=== Limited Edition Bonus DVD ===
1. "Not the Same" (Same version as Track #5 on the CD)
2. "Philosophy (Inc Misirlou)"
3. "Army"
4. "Album Art Antics" (photographing the cover; see above)
5. "Eddie Walker"
6. "The Ascent of Stan"
7. "Tiny Dancer"
8. "Song for the Dumped" (in a minor key)

== Personnel ==
- Ben Folds – vocals, piano
- John McCrea – vocals on track 8 (of CD)

=== Production ===
- Producers: Marc Chevalier, Ben Folds
- Engineer: Marc Chevalier
- Mixing: Marc Chevalier
- Mastering: Ted Jensen
- A&R: Ben Goldman, James Hynes, Fleming McWilliams
- Project manager: Scott Carter
- Compilation: Marc Chevalier
- Crew: Marc Chevalier
- Photography: David Leyes, Steve Volpe, Ben Folds
- Package design: John Heiden

== Charts ==
Chart (2002)	Peak position
Canadian Alternative Albums (Nielsen Soundscan)	37
US Billboard 200	60
US Top Internet Albums (Billboard)	60
