= Where's Summer B.? =

Single by Ben Folds Five

from the album Ben Folds Five
- Released: August 8, 1995 (album); 1996 (single)
- Recorded: Wave Castle, Chapel Hill, North Carolina; February 1995
- Genre: Alternative rock
- Length: 4:07
- Label: Passenger/Caroline; Vital Distribution (single)
- Songwriters: Ben Folds; Darren Michael Jessee
- Producer: Caleb Southern

Ben Folds Five singles chronology
"Underground" (1995)	"Where's Summer B.?" (1995)	"Philosophy" (1996)

"Where's Summer B.?" is a song from Ben Folds Five's 1995 first album, Ben Folds Five. It was written by Ben Folds and Darren Jessee. The song, though up-tempo, deals with the disappointment of returning to a hometown after being away and seeing things much the same as before.

== History ==
The song is told from the point of view of a friend of Summer B.'s. Summer has returned to her hometown after being away for a significant period of time. The friend explains the various mundane events that have occurred in Summer's absence.

The title character of Summer B. is a reference to Summer Burke, a friend of the band. Burke is credited with designing the band's distinctive stick drawing piano logo. Other real-life friends of Jessee's are mentioned throughout the song.

== Additional versions ==
A censored version of the song appears with the original album recording on the Summer EP, a four song CD released by Passenger/Caroline to promote the band to radio programmers. The censored (or "clean") version fades out the word "shit".

== Singles ==
=== Commercial CD single ===
The song was released as a CD single on June 7, 1996, in the United Kingdom, distributed by Vital Distribution for Passenger/Caroline. The other tracks of the single were recorded live on August 12, 1995, at Ziggy's in Winston-Salem, North Carolina, by John Alagia and Doug Derryberry. These tracks were mixed at Rutabaga Studios in Arlington, Virginia, in May, 1996. "Tom and Mary" also appears on the Japanese release of Ben Folds Five.

1. Where's Summer B.? – 4:06
2. Tom & Mary (Live) – 2:51
3. Emaline (Live) – 3:40

=== Commercial 7" vinyl single ===
The song was released as a 7" vinyl single on June 7, 1996, in the United Kingdom, distributed by Vital Distribution for Passenger/Caroline. The track on the "B" side, "Tom and Mary", was recorded live on August 12, 1995, at Ziggy's in Winston-Salem, North Carolina, by John Alagia and Doug Derryberry. "Tom and Mary" was mixed at Rutabaga Studios in Arlington, Virginia, in May, 1996, and also appears on the Japanese release of Ben Folds Five.

- Side A: Where's Summer B.? – 4:06
- Side B: Tom & Mary – 2:51

=== Promotional CD single ===
A promotional CD single was released in 1996 for the United Kingdom by Passenger/Caroline that featured both the album cut and the censored version of the song.

== Compilations and soundtracks ==
The album version of the song appears as the lead-off track on the 2000 charity compilation album Songs for Summer. The album was released to benefit Free Arts for Abused Children in memory of Summer Brannin, who died of kidney cancer at the age of 21. The album is a collection of some of Brannin's favorite songs and features a 'Summer' theme.

== Personnel ==
- Ben Folds – piano, vocals
- Darren Jessee – drums, vocals, tambourine
- Robert Sledge – bass guitar, vocals

=== Production ===
- Producer: Caleb Southern
- Mixing: Marc Becker
