= Philosophy (Ben Folds Five song) =

Single by Ben Folds Five

from the album Ben Folds Five
- Released: August 8, 1995 (album); 1996 (single)
- Recorded: Wave Castle, Chapel Hill, North Carolina; February 1995
- Genre: Alternative rock
- Length: 4:36
- Label: Passenger/Caroline; Intercord (single)
- Songwriter(s): Benjamin Scott Folds
- Producer(s): Caleb Southern

Ben Folds Five singles chronology
"Where's Summer B.?" (1995)	"Philosophy" (1995)	"Uncle Walter" (1996)

"Philosophy" is a song from Ben Folds Five's 1995 self-titled debut album. It was written by Ben Folds. Folds continues to play the song on various tours as part of his solo career.

== History ==
The liner notes for the 1998 compilation and rarities album Naked Baby Photos claim sarcastically that the song is about Folds' penis, "if that's what you think it's about." In his 2019 book, A Dream About Lightning Bugs, Folds discusses his philosophy in the chapter “Creative Visualization or Useful Delusion” where he says, "There’s this mode I go into from time to time... It begins with visualizing a seemingly impossible accomplishment as if it had already come to be. A trance ensues, mountains are moved and soon it is so... Results fueled by temporary delusion... its that temporary state of craziness that pushes us to make the fantasy real, whether it is building a house, writing a movie or running a marathon."

The piano solo at the end of the track borrows a melody line from Rhapsody in Blue by George Gershwin.

== Additional versions ==
Three live audio versions and two live video versions of "Philosophy" have been released, as has a radio edit of the album cut for a commercial single. The first of the live audio versions appears on a 1996 promotional CD set from Sony called Modern Rock Live, Volume 1. The 2-disc set was only available with the purchase of a Sony CD player and also featured songs from the Dave Matthews Band, The Posies, Jewel, Blues Traveler, the Violent Femmes, and others. The second live audio version, recorded at de Melkweg in Amsterdam on March 18, 1997, appears on Naked Baby Photos. While the third version, recorded March 20, 2002, at the Moore Theatre in Seattle during Folds' solo "Ben Folds and a Piano" tour, appears on the 2003 album Ben Folds Live. This version incorporates the Dick Dale surf rock classic "Misirlou" into the song.

Of the two live video versions of the song, the first – set to a montage of footage filmed at Georgetown University's Gaston Hall in Washington, DC; Cabaret Metro in Chicago; and in Australia – appears on Spare Reels, a video packaged in a limited edition offering of the 1999 album The Unauthorized Biography of Reinhold Messner. The second live video version, filmed in New York on June 9, 1997, for the PBS program Sessions at West 54th, appears on the 2001 music concert DVD Ben Folds Five – The Complete Sessions at West 54th. Spare Reels also appears, in its entirety, as an extra feature on this DVD.

An in-studio performance of "Philosophy" was recorded for the 2005 download-only album iTunes Originals – Ben Folds.

== Singles ==
A radio edit of the album version of the song was released as a European single in 1996 by Intercord Records for Passenger/Caroline. The other tracks on the single were recorded live on August 12, 1995, at Ziggy's in Winston-Salem, North Carolina, by John Alagia and Doug Derryberry. These tracks were mixed at Rutabaga Studios in Arlington, Virginia, in May, 1996. "Tom and Mary" also appears on the Japanese release of Ben Folds Five.

1. Philosophy (Radio Edit) – 3:48
2. Tom & Mary (Live) – 2:51
3. Emaline (Live) – 3:40

== Personnel ==
- Ben Folds – piano, vocals
- Darren Jessee – drums, vocals, tambourine
- Robert Sledge – bass, vocals

=== Production ===
- Producer: Caleb Southern
- Mixing: Marc Becker
