= Alice Childress (song) =

Song by Ben Folds Five

from the album Ben Folds Five
- Released: August 8, 1995
- Studio: Wave Castle, Chapel Hill, North Carolina
- Genre: Alternative rock
- Length: 4:00
- Label: Passenger/Caroline
- Songwriters: Benjamin Scott Folds, Anna Goodman
- Producer: Caleb Southern

"Alice Childress" is a song from Ben Folds Five's 1995 self-titled debut album. It was written by Ben Folds and Anna Goodman. The song is a look from a distance at the breakup of a couple who have fundamental differences in their outlooks on life.

== History ==
Despite the name, the song has nothing to do with playwright and author Alice Childress.

Anna Goodman, at the time Ben Folds' wife, was inspired to write the lyrics to a song as a parody of Folds' style. Folds has referred to Goodman's lyrics as "bad Folds," a wink to the now-defunct "International Imitation Hemingway Competition" put on by Harry's Bar & Grill in Century City, California.

Because of her contributions to the song, Goodman retains a writing credit.

== Additional versions ==
A live version of the song, recorded October 16, 1995, at the Santa Monica, California public radio station KCRW during the program Morning Becomes Eclectic, appears on the 1998 compilation and rarities album Naked Baby Photos.

An in-studio performance of the song was recorded for the 2005 download-only album iTunes Originals - Ben Folds.

== Compilations and soundtracks ==
The album version of the song appears on the Summer EP, a four song CD released by Passenger/Caroline in 1995 to promote the band to radio programmers.

The live version of the song appears on the 1997 album KCRW: Rare On Air, Vol. 3, put out by the Santa Monica public radio station on Mammoth Records. The album also includes songs by Cowboy Junkies, Fiona Apple, Guided by Voices, Stereolab, and others.

== Personnel ==
- Ben Folds – piano, vocals
- Darren Jessee – drums
- Robert Sledge – bass

=== Production ===
- Producer: Caleb Southern
- Mixing: Marc Becker
