= Underground (Ben Folds Five song) =

1996 single by Ben Folds Five

Single by Ben Folds Five

from the album Ben Folds Five
- Released: 1996
- Recorded: Wave Castle, Chapel Hill, North Carolina; February 1995
- Genre: Alternative rock
- Length: 4:12
- Label: Passenger/Caroline; Vital Distribution (single)
- Songwriter: Benjamin Scott Folds
- Producer: Caleb Southern

Ben Folds Five singles chronology
"Jackson Cannery" (1994)	"Underground" (1996)	"Where's Summer B.?" (UK; 1996)

Music video
- "Underground" on YouTube

"Underground" is a song from Ben Folds Five's 1995 self-titled debut album. It was written by Ben Folds. It peaked at #37 on the UK Singles Chart. The track was #3 for the year of 1996 on Australia's Triple J Hottest 100.

== History ==
Ben Folds has spoken of feeling a social outcast at times and finding it hard to make friends as a child because his family was constantly moving. As he found initial success with the band Majosha and then forming Ben Folds Five with Darren Jessee and Robert Sledge, he began to recognize members of his audiences as similar types of outcasts. He noted that these types of people, who were in search of their own identities, would often find themselves gravitating towards the underground scenes (punk, ska, hardcore, etc.) of independent music. They would latch onto the scenes with particular fervor.

"Underground" is both an ode to and castigation of these types of people, as well as the perceived notions of the underground scene looking in from the outside. As Folds says:

It's just exercising artistic freedom to put some different things together that I think are funny. I think it's funny to make a very happy, cabaret-sounding song about the underground of the indie rock world. I think it's funny to take those people and make them dance around like puppets and sing Bee Gees. That's part of why you write. It's the freedom to do stuff like that. If there's a statement in it at all – and it's not the heaviest song obviously – it's that the underground or indie scene or whatever you wanna call it is just a social club. It's just fun. They're not planning the next revolution. People get so fucking serious about it, but it's just like if you've got all the credit to apply for a country club, they're going to ask you the same questions.

The track became the first international commercial single and first U.S. radio single from the album Ben Folds Five.

When performed live, the song features a degree of audience participation, including coordinated sound effects and retorts to various lines throughout the song. Folds continues to perform the song occasionally during his solo career.

== Additional versions ==
Two distinct edited versions of the song exist. A radio edit version appears with the original album cut on a 1995 promotional CD sent to radio programmers in the United States, as well as a CD sent to the United Kingdom for the same purpose. The radio edit version also appears on a second promotional CD for the United Kingdom released in 1996.

The second edited version, a shortened version of the album cut of the song, was released as a commercial CD single in the United Kingdom in April 1996 by Vital Distribution for Passenger/Caroline. This version was released on a 7" vinyl single in the U.K. at the same time. A second 7" vinyl single was released in the U.K. in September 1996.

A live audio version of the song was released in August, 1996, in the United Kingdom by Vital Distribution as part of a 2-disc CD single set. Recorded August 12, 1995, at Ziggy's in Winston-Salem, North Carolina, by John Alagia and Doug Derryberry, this live version appears with the album cut of the song on the second disc of the set. The first disc of the set features the second edited studio version of the song.

The live audio version also appears on the 1998 compilation and rarities album Naked Baby Photos.

A live video version, filmed in New York on June 9, 1997, for the PBS program Sessions at West 54th, appears on the 2001 music concert DVD Ben Folds Five – The Complete Sessions at West 54th.

== Music video ==
The music video was directed by David Hale. It depicts the band performing in an Old West saloon as Western fighting and other hijinks occur around them.

== Singles ==
=== U.S. promotional CD single ===
Released in 1995 to radio programmers in the United States to promote the song and the album Ben Folds Five. Features the album cut of the song and a radio edit version that differs from a second edit found on the commercial single releases.

1. Underground (Radio Edit) – 3:17
2. Underground (Album Version) – 4:20

=== UK promotional CD single ===
Released in 1995 to radio programmers in the United Kingdom to promote the song and the album Ben Folds Five. Features the album cut of the song and a radio edit version that differs from a second edit found on the commercial single releases.

1. Underground (Radio Edit) – 3:17
2. Underground (Album Version) – 4:20

=== UK commercial CD single ===
Released in April 1996 in the United Kingdom by Vital Distribution for Passenger/Caroline. Features a second edited version of the song that is shorter than the album cut but longer than the radio edit version.

1. Underground (Edit #2) – 3:36
2. Sports & Wine (Album Version) – 2:58
3. Boxing (Album Version) – 4:42

=== UK commercial 7" vinyl single ===
Released in April 1996 in the United Kingdom by Vital Distribution for Passenger/Caroline. Features a second edited version of the song that is shorter than the album cut but longer than the radio edit version.

- Side A: Underground (Edit #2) – 3:36
- Side B: Sports & Wine (Album Version) – 2:58

=== Second UK promotional CD single ===
Released in 1996 to radio programmers in the United Kingdom to promote the song and the album Ben Folds Five. Features the radio edit version that differs from the edit found on the commercial single releases. The other tracks on the single were recorded live on August 12, 1995, at Ziggy's in Winston-Salem, North Carolina, by John Alagia and Doug Derryberry. The tracks were mixed by Alagia, Derryberry, and John Altschiller at Bias Recording Studios in Springfield, Virginia, and were mastered by Dave Glasser at Airshow in Springfield. "Satan is My Master" also appears on Naked Baby Photos.

1. Underground (Radio Edit) – 3:36
2. Satan is My Master (Live) – 1:31
3. Video (Live) – 4:10

=== UK commercial 2-CD single set ===
Released in April 1996 in the United Kingdom by Vital Distribution for Passenger/Caroline. Features a second edited version of the song on the first disc that is shorter than the album cut but longer than the radio edit version. The album cut and a live version of the song appear on the second disc. The other tracks were recorded live on August 12, 1995, at Ziggy's in Winston-Salem, North Carolina, by John Alagia and Doug Derryberry. The tracks were mixed by Alagia, Derryberry, and John Altschiller at Bias Recording Studios in Springfield, Virginia, and were mastered by Dave Glasser at Airshow in Springfield. The live version of "Underground" and "Satan is My Master" both also appear on Naked Baby Photos.
Disc One

1. Underground (Radio Edit) – 3:36
2. Satan is My Master (Live) – 1:31
3. Video (Live) – 4:10

Disc Two

1. Underground (Album Version) – 4:12
2. Jackson Cannery (Live) – 4:05
3. Underground (Live) – 5:14

== Personnel ==
- Ben Folds – piano, vocals
- Darren Jessee – drums, vocals, percussion
- Robert Sledge – bass, vocals

=== Production ===
- Producer: Caleb Southern
- Mixing: Marc Becker
