= Naked Baby Photos =

Compilation album by Ben Folds Five
- Released: January 13, 1998
- Genre: Alternative rock
- Length: 55:18
- Label: Caroline Records
- Producer: John Alagía

Ben Folds Five chronology
| Whatever and Ever Amen (1997) | Naked Baby Photos (1998) | The Unauthorized Biography of Reinhold Messner (1999) |

Professional ratings
Review scores
| Source | Rating |
|---|---|
| Allmusic | 3/5 stars |
| Entertainment Weekly | C |
| Pitchfork Media | 5/10 |
| The Rolling Stone Album Guide | 2.5/5 stars |
| Select | 2/5 stars |
| Uncut | 2/5 stars |

Naked Baby Photos is a compilation album comprising outtake material from recordings of Ben Folds Five's first two studio albums and live performances. Most of the tracks are previously unreleased rarities.

Caroline Records' webpage for Naked Baby Photos features explanations of each track's origins from Ben Folds.

== Track listing ==
All lyrics are written by Ben Folds, except where noted.

| No. | Title | Lyrics | Length |
|---|---|---|---|
| 1. | "Eddie Walker" | | 3:20 |
| 2. | "Jackson Cannery" (original 7" version) | | 4:01 |
| 3. | "Emaline" | Folds; Evan Olson | 3:23 |
| 4. | "Alice Childress" (live, 10/16/95, on KCRW, Los Angeles, CA) | Folds; Anna Goodman | 4:21 |
| 5. | "Dick Holster" | | 0:28 |
| 6. | "Tom & Mary" | | 2:35 |
| 7. | "For Those of Y'all Who Wear Fannie Packs" | Folds; Darren Jessee; Robert Sledge | 6:06 |
| 8. | "Bad Idea" | Folds; Jessee; Sledge | 2:07 |
| 9. | "Underground" (live, 8/12/95, at Ziggy's, Winston Salem, NC) | | 4:43 |
| 10. | "The Ultimate Sacrifice" (live, 5/28/97, at Lupo's, Providence, RI) | Folds; Jessee; Sledge | 3:28 |
| 11. | "Satan Is My Master" (live, 8/12/95, at Ziggy's, Winston Salem, NC) | Folds; Jessee; Sledge | 1:33 |
| 12. | "Julianne" (live, 11/26/96, at LA2, London, England) | | 2:35 |
| 13. | "Song for the Dumped" (live, 11/26/96, at LA2, London, England) | Folds; Jessee | 4:42 |
| 14. | "Philosophy" (live, 3/18/97, at De Melkweg, Amsterdam, the Netherlands) | | 4:52 |
| 15. | "Twin Falls" (live, 2/26/96, at Club Quattro, Tokyo) | Doug Martsch | 2:25 |
| 16. | "Boxing" (live, 2/26/96, at Club Quattro, Tokyo) | | 4:38 |

== Personnel ==
Ben Folds Five

- Ben Folds – vocals, piano
- Robert Sledge – bass, background vocals
- Darren Jessee – drums, background vocals

Production

- Mastered by Howie Weinberg
- Scott MacLeod - Live Sound Engineer
- Leo Overtoom - Live Sound Engineer
- Alan Wolmark - Management
- Peter Felstead - Management
- Wendi Horowitz - Sleeve design
- Robert Sledge - Sleeve design
- John Falls - Outer booklet photos
