= Do It Anyway (Ben Folds Five song) =

2012 single by Ben Folds Five

- Cover art by Luther Mosher

Single by Ben Folds Five

from the album The Sound of the Life of the Mind
- Released: May 4, 2012
- Genre: Alternative rock
- Length: 3:54
- Label: IMA Vee Pee Records
- Songwriter: Ben Folds
- Producer: Joe Pisapia

Ben Folds Five singles chronology
"Don't Change Your Plans" (1999)	"Do It Anyway" (2012)	"Draw a Crowd / Sky High" (2013)

Music video
- "Do It Anyway" on YouTube

"Do It Anyway" is an alternative rock song by the band Ben Folds Five, from their 2012 album The Sound of the Life of the Mind. It was the first song released by the band in over a decade.

== Video ==
The video for the song features the Fraggles of 80's children's show fame. Uncle Traveling Matt is exploring the Silly Creatures' (humans') musical ritual (recording). The band's playing causes an earthquake in Fraggle Rock, which is under the recording studio. The Fraggles cautiously join the band to perform the song. Mokey joins Ben Folds on piano. Gobo pairs with bassist Robert Sledge. Wembley pops up behind the drums with Darren Jessee

Chris Hardwick plays a studio gate guard smitten with a cool receptionist (Anna Kendrick). After bumping into Hardwick's character in the hallway, Kendrick's character discovers that he has a tattoo of an artist she loves ("Boy Gorg", a humorous Boy George-styled Junior Gorg). The story ends with recording engineer (Rob Corddry) saying, "Wow. Guys, that was.. ok. I mean, I think we can do better. Let's actually record this one."

The video closes with Folds, Kendrick, Hardwick, and Corddry singing the Fraggle Rock Theme: "Dance your cares away. Worries for another day. Let the music play – down at Fraggle Rock (down at Fraggle Rock)." Boober pops up to deliver the traditional closing line, "down at Fraggle Rock."

The music video was accompanied by a behind-the-scenes video, featuring interviews with Folds, Sledge, Jessee, Hardwick, and Red Fraggle. The executive producers were Hardwick and Lisa Henson.

== Cover art ==
The single was originally released with artwork by Luther Mosher until the full album was released. Afterwards the album art was attached to the single, but the Mosher art was still being used in some places for promotion.

== Personnel ==
- Ben Folds – piano, vocals
- Darren Jessee – drums
- Robert Sledge – bass

=== Production ===
- Producer: Joe Pisapia
- Recording & Mixing: Joe Costa
