= The Sound of the Life of the Mind =

Studio album by Ben Folds Five
- Released: September 18, 2012
- Recorded: January – February 2012
- Genres: Alternative rock, power pop
- Length: 44:34
- Label: ImaVeePee Records
- Producer: Joe Pisapia

Ben Folds Five chronology
The Unauthorized Biography of Reinhold Messner (1999)	The Sound of the Life of the Mind (2012)	Live (2013)

Singles from The Sound of the Life of the Mind
- 1. "Do It Anyway" Released: 2012

Professional ratings
Aggregate scores
Source	Rating
Metacritic	(61/100)
Review scores
Source	Rating
Allmusic	3.5/5 stars
Alternative Press	3/5 stars
American Songwriter	3.5/5 stars
The A.V. Club	B
Consequence of Sound	3.5/5 stars
Drowned in Sound	(6/10)
musicOMH	3.5/5 stars
Pitchfork Media	(3.5/10)
PopMatters	7/10 stars
Slant Magazine	2.5/5 stars
Spin	(7/10)
Under the Radar	4.5/10 stars

The Sound of the Life of the Mind is the fourth studio album by Ben Folds Five, released on September 18, 2012. It is the group's first release since 1999's The Unauthorized Biography of Reinhold Messner.

The album debuted at No. 10 on the Billboard 200, which is Ben Folds' first top ten album on the chart, selling 30,000 copies. It sold 67,000 copies as of August 2015.

== Production ==
In 2011, Ben Folds Five reunited to record three tracks for Ben Folds' The Best Imitation of Myself: A Retrospective. Bolstered by the experience, the band reconvened in Folds' Nashville studio and recorded the bulk of the album over a six-week period between January and February 2012. Following the main tracking session, the band met for a separate two-week session to record main vocals and a final one-week session for background vocals in the week prior to their Bonnaroo Music Festival appearance in June 2012. All but two of the songs on the album are written by Folds. Darren Jessee wrote the song "Sky High" and author Nick Hornby provided unused lyrics from his 2011 collaboration with Folds on the album's title track.

The band considered using producer Caleb Southern, who had produced their first three albums, but he was unavailable. In his place, they turned to producer Joe Pisapia, a multi-instrumentalist and former member of the band Guster.

Of the sessions together, Folds noted that they have enough material for at least two more records.

== Crowdfunding and release ==
An unmastered version of the album's first single, "Do It Anyway", was released by Ben Folds on his official Facebook page on May 4, 2012, to kick off a grassroots effort to market and promote the album. Though Folds was signed to Sony Music Entertainment's Epic Records for his solo work and Jessee was signed to independent label Bar/None Records with his band Hotel Lights, the reformed Ben Folds Five was unsigned. With no label to distribute their new album, on May 7, 2012, the group launched an interactive pre-sale campaign for the press and release of the album on PledgeMusic. The crowdfunding campaign reached 200% in its first week.

The resulting initiative, ImaVeePee Records, partnered with Sony Music Entertainment to release the album worldwide. A portion of the funds generated by the campaign, by the total album sales, and by purchases of other Ben Folds Five items through PledgeMusic will be donated to Music Education and Music Therapy, a charity selected by the band.

The fully mixed and mastered album version of "Do It Anyway" was released for digital download on August 6, 2012. In the two weeks leading up to the commercial release of the album, the band hosted full previews of each track via exclusive releases through various music media outlets, including Spin, Conan O'Brien's TeamCoco.com, AOL's Spinner.com, Fuse, Idolator, Rolling Stone, Paste, Yahoo! Music, and MSN's Reverb music blog.

The video to "Do It Anyway", which premiered mid-September 2012, featured the puppets of Fraggle Rock, Chris Hardwick, Rob Corddry, and Anna Kendrick.

== Album art ==
The album cover features an exclusive piece entitled "Submerged" by artist Eric Joyner, noted for the focus on "robots and donuts" as the main subjects of his work. An adaptation of his 2007 work, "The Collator", "Submerged" is a somber yet whimsical piece showcasing a toy robot sitting thoughtfully on a mossy undersea rock as fish swim about it. The image evokes Auguste Rodin's The Thinker (Le Penseur).

More of Joyner's artwork is featured throughout the physical packaging of the album.

The single for "Do It Anyway" was originally released with artwork by Luther Mosher until the full album was released. Afterwards the album art was attached to the single. It is still being used in some places for promotion.

== Track listing ==
All lyrics are written by Ben Folds, except where noted; all music is composed by Folds, except where noted.

No.	Title	Lyrics	Music	Length
1.	"Erase Me"			5:15
2.	"Michael Praytor, Five Years Later"			4:32
3.	"Sky High"	Darren Jessee	Jessee	4:42
4.	"The Sound of the Life of the Mind"	Nick Hornby		4:10
5.	"On Being Frank"			4:33
6.	"Draw a Crowd"			4:14
7.	"Do It Anyway"			4:23
8.	"Hold That Thought"			4:14
9.	"Away When You Were Here"			3:30
10.	"Thank You for Breaking My Heart"			4:50

== Personnel ==
Ben Folds Five

- Ben Folds – lead vocals, piano, keyboards
- Darren Jessee – drums, percussion, vocals
- Robert Sledge – bass guitar, synthesizer, double bass, vocals

The Love Sponge Strings (on "On Being Frank" and "Away When You Were Here")

- Sari Reist – cello
- Kristin Wilkinson – viola
- David Angell and David Davidson – violin

Production

- Ben Folds – production, string arrangement on "Away When You Were Here"
- Joe Pisapia – production
- Paul Buckmaster – string arrangement on "On Being Frank"
- Joe Costa – recording, mixing
- Sorrel Brigman, Tom Freitag and Christopher Wilkinson – assistant engineers
- Leslie Richter – additional engineering
- Stephen Marcussen – mastering

== Charts ==
Chart (2012)	Peak position
Australian Albums (ARIA)	24
UK Albums (Official Charts)	40
US Billboard 200	10
US Top Alternative Albums (Billboard)	3
US Indie Store Album Sales (Billboard)	9
US Top Rock Albums (Billboard)	6
