= Silver Street (disambiguation) =

Silver Street may be:

- Silver Street, a radio soap opera
- Silver Street, Cambridge, England
- Silver Street, London
- Silver Street railway station, Edmonton, London, England
- Silver Street, Bath, a Local Nature Reserve in England
- "Silver Street", a song by Ben Folds released on Ben Folds Live and Fifty-Five Vault
- Some hamlets in England:
  - Silver Street, Gloucestershire, in Coaley parish
  - Silver Street, Kent, in Bredgar parish
  - Silver Street, Somerset, in Barton St David parish
  - Silver Street, Somerset, in West Buckland parish
  - Silver Street, Worcestershire, in Wythall parish
