= Live (Ben Folds Five album) =

Live album by Ben Folds Five
- Released: June 4, 2013
- Recorded: Various Locations, 2012–2013
- Genre: Alternative rock
- Length: 73:33
- Label: Sony Music Entertainment / ImaVeePee
- Producer: Ben Folds Five

Ben Folds Five chronology
The Sound of the Life of the Mind (2012)	Live (2013)	Playlist: The Very Best of Ben Folds Five (2015)

Live is the first official compilation of live material by the band Ben Folds Five. It was released on June 4, 2013, via Ben Folds' own ImaVeePee Records and distributed by Sony Music Entertainment.

The album is a compilation of live recordings taken during the band's world tour in support of their reunion record, The Sound of the Life of the Mind.

== Reception ==
Professional ratings
Review scores
Source	Rating
AllMusic	3/5 stars
Paste Magazine	7.1 stars on a 10-point scale
American Songwriter	3.5/5 stars
Diffuser.fm	9/10 stars
Consequence of Sound	C

The album received positive reviews from AllMusic, Paste Magazine, and American Songwriter. Allmusic gave Ben Folds Five: Live 3 out of 5 stars, saying "...while the trio may not enjoy the same levels of athleticism that they did in their twenties, they've certainly lost nothing in the chops department."

== Track listing ==
No.	Title	Length
1.	"Jackson Cannery (The Warfield, San Francisco CA, 1/31/13)"	3:48
2.	"Erase Me (The Warfield, San Francisco CA, 1/31/13)"	5:18
3.	"Selfless, Cold and Composed (House of Blues, Boston MA, 10/13/12)"	6:06
4.	"Uncle Walter (Kool Haus, Toronto, Ontario, Canada, 10/5/12"	4:02
5.	"Landed (The Warfield, San Francisco CA, 1/31/13)"	4:27
6.	"Sky High (Thebarton Theatre, Adelaide AU, 11/16/12)"	4:56
7.	"One Chord Blues/Billie's Bounce (The Wiltern, Los Angeles CA 1/26/13)"	3:48
8.	"Do It Anyway/Overture-Heaven on Their Minds (O2 Academy, Brixton UK, 12/4/12)"	5:12
9.	"Brick (The Warfield, San Francisco CA, 1/31/13)"	4:41
10.	"Draw A Crowd (Capitol, Port Chester NY, 10/9/12)"	4:54
11.	"Narcolepsy (Hitomi Kinen Hall, Tokyo JP, 2/16/13)"	9:33
12.	"Underground (Mielparque Hall, Osaka JP, 2/22/13)"	4:36
13.	"Tom and Mary (O2 Academy, Bristol UK, 11/23/12)"	3:02
14.	"One Angry Dwarf and 200 Solemn Faces (The Warfield, San Francisco CA, 1/31/13)"	4:16
15.	"Song for the Dumped (Thebarton Theatre, Adelaide AU, 11/16/12)"	5:03

== Personnel ==
- Ben Folds – piano, vocals
- Darren Jessee – drums, vocals
- Robert Sledge – bass, vocals

=== Production ===
- Recording: Leo Overtoom
- Mixing: Joe Costa
- Mastering: Steve Marcussen
- Monitor Engineer: Michael Praytor
- Photography: Clay Lancaster and Ben Folds
