= Eric Joyner =

American painter

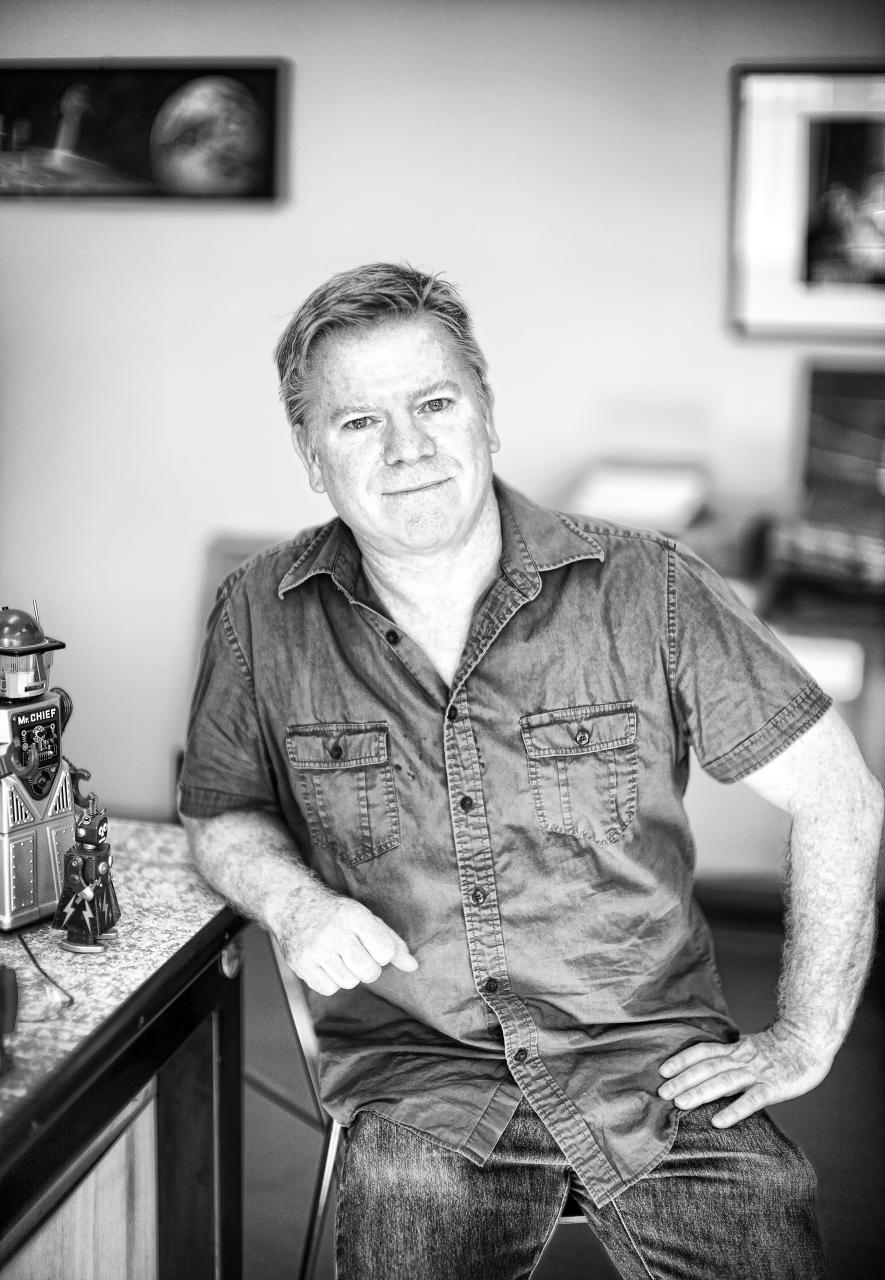
- Joyner in 2013
- Born: 1959 or 1960 (age 65–66); San Mateo, California
- Occupation: Artist

Eric Joyner (born c. 1960) is a contemporary American artist whose body of work has focused on robots and donuts.

== Early life and career ==
Joyner grew up in San Mateo, California, and spent some time in Medford, Oregon, after his family moved there. He was always interested in art and attended the Academy of Art University in San Francisco. He began working as a commercial illustrator in 1984 and created the cover art for several video games, such as Tales of the Unknown, Volume I: The Bard's Tale, Realm of Impossibility, and Archon II: Adept.

== Robots and donuts ==
In 1999, he chose to focus only on topics that he likes. He started painting with four different elements: Mexican masks, San Francisco city life, old newspaper cartoons and Japanese robots. He found that the robots were the most popular feature with his friends. He had been collecting toy robots for about 20 years and wanted to bring them to life. In 2002, he felt that he needed another element to work off of. Inspired by the film Pleasantville, in which Jeff Daniels paints donuts, Joyner added donuts. The donuts have been featured as both objects of desire and adversaries to the robots.

== Sales and reach ==
Joyner paints approximately 20 paintings a year with his original works selling from anywhere from $3000 a piece to $75,000. George Lucas is one of his most famous buyers. Several of his paintings are used as set pieces in the TV show The Big Bang Theory. An adaptation of his 2007 work "The Collator", "Submerged", is featured on the album cover for the Ben Folds Five album The Sound of the Life of the Mind. His painting "Malfunction" is used on the cover of Robot Law, a scholarly volume on robotics law and policy edited by Ryan Calo, A. Michael Froomkin, and Ian Kerr.

== Books ==
Joyner has two books about his paintings including Robots and Donuts (2008) and Robotic Existentialism: The Art of Eric Joyner (2018).
