= Army (Ben Folds Five song) =

Single by Ben Folds Five

from the album The Unauthorized Biography of Reinhold Messner
- Released: 1999
- Genre: Rock
- Label: 550
- Songwriter: Ben Folds
- Producer: Caleb Southern

Ben Folds Five singles chronology
"Song for the Dumped" (1998)	"Army" (1999)	"Don't Change Your Plans" (1999)

Music video
- "Army" on YouTube

"Army" is an alternative rock song by the band Ben Folds Five from their 1999 album The Unauthorized Biography of Reinhold Messner. It reached number 28 on the charts in the UK.

== Lyrics, composition, and popularity ==
The song deals with indecision, independence, conflict, and freedom in describing the narrator's struggles to find his way in life as he contemplates joining the military, enrolls in college, drops out, and joins a band ("Well I thought about the army / dad said 'Son, you're fucking high!'"). The song is popular among fans, and has remained part of Folds's concerts in his solo career.

Folds has explained at live performances that the entire song is based on personal experiences, with a few exceptions. He never grew a mullet, though the song's lyrics say "Grew a mustache and a mullet / Got a job at Chick-fil-A."

Here is Folds's explanation from a recording at Enmore:

This one's about my really horrible experience trying to get through college. And I got a scholarship and then I lost a scholarship... after a semester cause I flunked a class because I flunked one test. The class was based on one test. The one I flunked. I flunked the test because I got delivered to the test in a police car at six o'clock in the morning with stitches in my nose and stitches in my mouth. And I was still drunk. And I had a broken hand, presumably because I had clocked that ass. I hit the wall.

So I threw my drum set, which is the instrument that I flunked on, into Lake Osceola in the middle of University of Miami and I took a Greyhound bus, I don't shit you, it was a Greyhound bus back home and I worked with a bunch of old ladies in a grocery store for about 18 months. It was at that time that I decided in my bedroom I decided while listening to Elvis Costello in 1986 that maybe I shouldn't wait tables and do this old lady job anymore, maybe... I should join the Army.

And umm, for those of you who know the lyrics from the song I derived them, except for the rhyming part which I setup myself, I derived it from the way it actually went down.

My father knocked on the door. I'll just be dad for a second:
[Knock, knock, knock] "Benjamin, what are you doing in there?"
"Well I was thinking about joining the army..."

"You're fucking high"

The clean version is sometimes referred to as the "We Got the 'Fuck' Out edit".

== Live performances ==
=== Sessions at West 54th, 1997/2001 ===
The DVD Ben Folds Five - The Complete Sessions at West 54th, released in 2001, captured the taping of a June 9, 1997 performance for a TV broadcast of Sessions at West 54th on November 9, 1997, and released as a DVD in 2001. It included a bonus segment, Spare Reels of footage capturing the band recording the song as part of The Unauthorized Biography of Reinhold Messner album between November 1997 and January 1998. In the bonus video, the lyrics were slightly different, and the horn parts were scat sung by Folds or omitted.

=== Freaking Out (DVD), 1999 ===
In the bootleg Freaking Out broadcast DVD shot in Tokyo in 1999, Robert Sledge changes the line "God, please spare me more rejection!" to "God I've got a HUGE erection!"

=== Conan O'Brien's The Legally Prohibited from Being Funny on Television Tour, 2010 ===
The song was performed by the Legally Prohibited Band as Conan O'Brien's introduction music on his Legally Prohibited from Being Funny on Television Tour.

=== Ben Folds Live, 2002 ===
On the live album Ben Folds Live, Folds introduces the song to the audience by saying: "This one goes out to anyone who actually signed up and is in—is gone into the armed forces. Thanks a lot. I tried, I went down to the recruiting center and I talked to them, and I thought about it, but at the end of the day, I think I was genetically inclined to be a musician." He then goes on to instruct the audience in singing the horn parts: "We've got enough people in here to get a bitchin' horn section, so let's cut the audience down the middle. This side, saxophones, this side's trumpets." Later live audiences were split into "bitch and whore sections" by Ben, an auditory spin off of the phrase "bitchin' horn section" heard on Ben Folds Live. The ensemble parts are often performed by the crowds during concerts in an audience participation bit which Folds "conducts". In addition, the audience customarily sings the line, "God please spare me more rejection." Folds also frequently changes the last line from "the army" to "your mommy" or, on occasion, "all y'all's mommies".

=== Prairie Home Companion, 2016 ===
Folds performed a "clean version" of the song live on January 30, 2016, on the nationally-broadcast radio show Prairie Home Companion, with guest host Chris Thile accompanying in singing and playing mandolin.

== In popular culture ==
The song is featured in the Viceland comedy series Nirvanna the Band the Show as the end credits theme song, as well as in its web series predecessor Nirvana the Band the Show. The song was later used during the opening credits to Nirvanna the Band the Show the Movie, released in 2026.

== Track listing ==
=== CD single I ===
No.	Title	Length
1.	"Army"	3:25
2.	"Air"	3:20
3.	"(Theme from) Dr. Pyser"	3:15

=== CD single II ===
No.	Title	Length
1.	"Army (clean version)"	3:25
2.	"Leather Jacket"	3:20
3.	"Birds"	3:15

=== 45 RPM single ===
Side one
No.	Title	Length
1.	"Army"	3:25

Side two
No.	Title	Length
1.	"Leather Jacket"	2:15
2.	"Birds"	2:08

== Charts ==
Weekly chart performance for "Army"
Chart (1999)	Peak position
UK Singles (OCC)	28
