= Gaijin à Go-Go =

American J-pop band

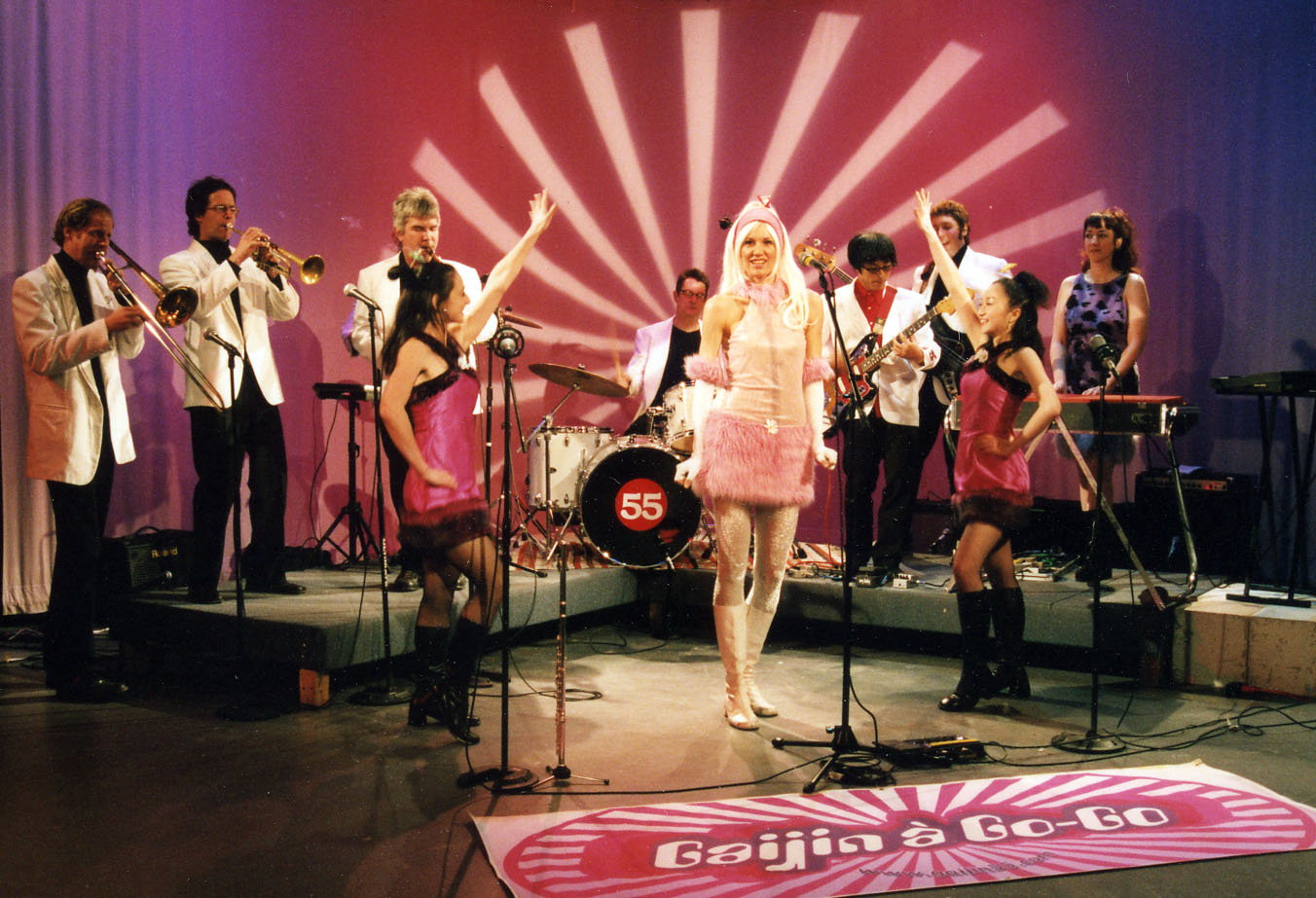
- Gaijin à Go-Go, 2005

Background information
- Origin: New York City, New York, United States
- Genres: J-pop, electronic
- Years active: 1999–present
- Labels: Columbia, Sony Music
- Past members: Kiku Kimonolisa (Petra Hanson); Saiko Mikan (Sanford Santacroce); Tatami Matt (Jon Young); Mikasa S. Tsucasa (Catherine Carney); Kinki Pajamamoto (Yuji Horibe); Akira Sweetensawa (Jamey Evans); Wink Lady (Jasmine Moran, Eri Hanyu, Cindy Tomm, Cindy Yang, Jaygee Macapugay); Lick Shakuhachi (Rick Pierce); Oh Sosumi (Winston Rice) "Beat" Up "Takeshi" (Gavin Smith); Ryuichi Sakagogo III (Jaesun Celebre); Zen Stephani (Peter Gingerich); Gamera Obscura (Andy Schoengold)
- Website: gaijin.us

Gaijin à Go-Go is an American J-pop band from New York.

== History ==
In 1999, former model and fashion designer Petra Hanson placed a newspaper ad looking for members for the "fun, fantasy, not fame" band she hoped to form. Bassist Sanford Santacroce, drummer Jon Young, keyboardist Catherine Carney and guitarist Yuji Horibe joined Hanson to form Gaijin à Go-Go. The number of band members varied throughout the years the band was active from the beginning five up to twelve members. Originally, the band planned to draw from multiple influences including French, Italian, Brazilian and 1960s Japanese music. It soon realized a scope that broad was not fitting, and settled on a 1960s Japanese pop culture for its inspiration.

In 2002, the band self-released its first EP, Hello Copycat, which garnered it attention from Sony Music International, with whom Go-Go signed a record deal. While performing a gig at Don Hill's in Manhattan, Gaijin à Go-Go was noticed by Sony Music executives, who signed them two days later. Sony hired Joe Blaney to produce the band's debut album. Go-Go released two full-length albums, Happy-55-Lucky and Merry-55-Round with Sony in 2003. The latter featured remixes of Go-Go's songs by Yasuharu Konishi, King Britt and Ursula 1000, and an original track recorded for Fuji-TV's broadcasts of New York Yankees baseball games. That same year, the band also contributed on Konishi's Atom is Born album. In 2006, the band's final album, Go-Go Boot Camp premiered at Brooklyn Botanic Garden's annual Cherry Blossom Festival. Gaijin à Go-Go was featured in the independent film Stanley Cuba, which released in 2007.

Gaijin à Go-Go tracks have appeared on the soundtracks of the television programs Travel Channel's Extreme Restaurants, MTV's The Hills and Fox's Touch. They also have songs featured in compilation albums Atom is Born: The Remixes, released in 2003 by EMI Music Japan; Wild Sazanami Beat Vol. 2, released in 2004 by Sanznami Records and Ursadelica, released in 2004 by ESL Records.

== Discography ==
- Hello Copycat (2002) self-released EP
- Happy-55-Lucky (2003) released by Columbia and Sony Music International
- Merry-55-Round (2003) released by Columbia and Sony Music International
- Go-Go Boot Camp (2006) self-released album
