= No Boundaries: A Benefit for the Kosovar Refugees =

No Boundaries: A Benefit For The Kosovar Refugees

Compilation album by Various artists
- Released: June 15, 1999
- Genre: Various
- Length: 67:40
- Label: Epic

No Boundaries: A Benefit For The Kosovar Refugees is a benefit album released on June 15, 1999, by Epic Records featuring a handful of artists raising money for Kosovars sent by aeroplane to Australia during the Kosovo War. It was released in Australia on June 21, 1999, and has music from Australian band Jebediah and New Zealand singer Bic Runga. Three organizations received $1 million from Epic as well as future revenues from the album. Those organizations Médecins Sans Frontières, OXFAM, and Cooperative for Assistance and Relief Everywhere.

Professional ratings
Review scores
Source	Rating
AllMusic	link
Entertainment Weekly	(B) link
Robert Christgau	link

== Track listing ==
1. "Last Kiss" – Pearl Jam (B-side of their 1998 Fan Club Christmas Single)
2. "Baba" – Alanis Morissette (live)
3. "Ghost of Tom Joad" – Rage Against the Machine (bonus CD single from "Rage Against the Machine" home video)
4. "War of Man" – Neil Young (live)
5. "Freak on a Leash" – Korn (Butch Vig Mix)
6. "Psycho Man" – Black Sabbath (Danny Saber remix)
7. "Comedown" – Bush (acoustic version)
8. "Leather Jacket" – Ben Folds Five (unreleased studio track)
9. "Take Me Away" – Oasis (B-side of British "Supersonic" single)
10. "Mary" – Sarah McLachlan (live)
11. "Go" – Indigo Girls (live)
12. "Used to Be Lucky" – The Wallflowers (B-side to "6th Avenue Heartache" single, also on the Japanese version of "Bringing Down the Horse" album)
13. "Wolf in Sheep's Clothing" – Jamiroquai (B-side to British "Canned Heat" single)
14. "Merman" – Tori Amos (unreleased studio track)
15. "Fourteen Black Paintings" – Peter Gabriel (from his album "Us")
16. "Soldier of Love (Lay Down Your Arms)" – Pearl Jam (A-Side of their 1998 Fan Club Christmas Single)

The European edition included the following bonus tracks:

1. "She Is Suffering" – Manic Street Preachers (US remix)
2. "He's Gone" – Suede (demo version)

They appeared as tracks 16 and 17 respectively, while Pearl Jam still had the final track.

The Brazilian edition, named Sem Fronteiras: Em Beneficio dos Refugiados do Kosovo, included the following bonus tracks from Brazilian artists as tracks 17 and 18:

1. "Esperança (Na Mata Eu Tenho)" – Mestre Ambrósio
2. "Por Que Não Paz?" – Dread Lion

The Australian / New Zealand version has a different track list. Australian band Jebediah and New Zealand singer Bic Runga are added while Suede and Manic Street Preachers are omitted. However the song "Trapdoor" by Jebidiah becomes track 4 and the remaining tracks shift one position down with Bic Runga's "Lonely Lola Cherry Cola Girl" entering the list as track 14.
