= Ben Folds and WASO Live in Perth =

2005 Ben Folds live DVD

Video by Ben Folds and West Australian Symphony Orchestra
- Released: December 6, 2005
- Recorded: March 12 & 13, 2005
- Genre: Alternative rock
- Length: 1 hour 20 minutes
- Label: Epic (Sony BMG)
- Director: Ray Black
- Producers: John Minor, Calvin Aurand

Ben Folds and WASO Live in Perth is a DVD featuring performances by singer-songwriter and pianist Ben Folds, backed by the West Australian Symphony Orchestra. Filmed over two nights on March 12 and 13, 2005, at Kings Park and Botanical Gardens in Perth, Australia - a venue Folds jokingly refers to as a "luminous green petri dish" - the DVD offers 14 songs from the three major Ben Folds Five albums and Folds' debut solo album Rockin' the Suburbs.

Played to over 9000 fans, the two concerts featured on the DVD represent the first time Folds' music was set to an orchestra; this is a trend Folds has since continued with performances with various orchestras around the United States and the world, including Cleveland's Contemporary Youth Orchestra, the Sydney Symphony Orchestra, the Baltimore Symphony Orchestra, members of the Chamber Orchestra of Philadelphia, and the Boston Pops. Folds' music was rewritten and arranged specifically for symphonic performance by members of the West Australian Symphony Orchestra, conducted by Simon Kenway.

== Track listing ==
1. "Zak and Sara" (arranged by Iain Grandage)
2. "Smoke" (arranged by Michael Pigneguy)
3. "Fred Jones Part 2" (arranged by Iain Grandage)
4. "Steven's Last Night in Town" (arranged by Graeme Lyall)
5. "Boxing" (arranged by Stephen Newcomb)
6. "Annie Waits" (arranged by James Ledger)
7. "Brick" (arranged by James Ledger)
8. "Evaporated" (arranged by Stephen Newcomb)
9. "Not the Same"
10. "The Ascent of Stan" (arranged by James Ledger)
11. "Lullabye" (arranged by Graeme Lyall)
12. "Narcolepsy" (arranged by James Ledger)

Encore

1. "Rock This Bitch (Perth Version)"
2. "The Luckiest" (arranged by James Ledger)

== Personnel ==
- Ben Folds - vocals and piano
- West Australian Symphony Orchestra - 83 pieces
- Simon Kenway - conductor
- Graeme Lyall - saxophone and arrangements
- Stuart Haycock - tenor

== Production ==
Produced and presented by the West Australian Symphony Orchestra
Assisted by the Botanic Gardens and Parks Authority, Perth, Australia

- Producer: John Minor
- Director: Ray Black
