= Brick (song) =

1997 single by Ben Folds Five

Single by Ben Folds Five

from the album Whatever and Ever Amen
- B-side: "Smoke" (Live); "Kate (Ska remix)"; "Mitchell Lane"
- Released: 1997
- Genre: Alternative rock
- Length: 4:31
- Label: Epic
- Songwriters: Ben Folds; Darren Jessee
- Producers: Ben Folds; Caleb Southern

Ben Folds Five singles chronology
"One Angry Dwarf & 200 Solemn Faces" (1997)	"Brick" (1997)	"Song for the Dumped" (1998)

Music video
- "Brick" on YouTube

"Brick" is a song by American alternative rock group Ben Folds Five. It was released in November 1997 as a single from their album Whatever and Ever Amen and later on Ben Folds Live. The verses were written by Ben Folds based on the true story of taking his high school girlfriend to get an abortion and the impact this had on their relationship. The chorus was written by the band's drummer, Darren Jessee. "Brick" was one of Ben Folds Five's biggest hits, gaining much mainstream radio play in the US, the UK, and Australia.

== Background ==
On the album Ben Folds Live, Folds explained:

"People ask me what this song's about... I was asked about it a lot, and I didn't really wanna make a big hairy deal out of it, because I just wanted the song to speak for itself. But the song is about when I was in high school, me and my girlfriend had to get an abortion, and it was a very sad thing. And, I didn't really want to write this song from any kind of political standpoint, or make a statement. I just wanted to reflect what it feels like. So, anyone who's gone through that before, then you'll know what the song's about."

Folds wrote the song on guitar rather than piano, and performed it as such on tour with The Bens in 2003.

== Fan response ==
In his iTunes Originals interviews, Folds addresses his fanbase's disapproval: "When you have a hit song, much of your fanbase and people that listen to your music... their opinion is gonna be loud and clear that they feel that you've abandoned the fanbase; you've written something that's not for them, it's for everybody else, you've 'sold out', all kinds of things like that... That was the overwhelming vibe... 'What is that crap?'... because we'd been playing silly, up-tempo... we were the piano band that rocks... We couldn't even fit the song into a show."

He goes on to explain in the same interview that he was not put off by the fans: "When I look back on it, I think that the fact that that song was a hit gives me some confidence in pop music because the song is completely honest, what it is, it's crafted well, it's relaxed, it's recorded in a way that we'd never recorded a song before, which was absolutely live, three or four microphones in a bedroom. The song cannot have more integrity than it had."

"Brick" was voted in at number 12 in the Triple J Hottest 100 for 1998. In the Hottest 100 songs of all time poll conducted by Australian radio station Triple J in July 2009, Brick placed in at #67. More than half a million votes were cast in the poll.

== Music video ==
The music video features the band performing in front of a film projected on a screen on a wall, with several inches of water covering the floor.

Actress and artist Ariana Richards appears as a pregnant teen in the video.

== Track listing ==
1. "Brick" – 4:43
2. "Smoke" – 4:52
3. "Kate" – 3:14
4. "Fair" – 4:43
5. "Mitchell Lane" – 3:40

== Personnel ==
- Ben Folds – vocals, piano, producer, engineer, songwriting
- Darren Jessee – drums, songwriting
- Robert Sledge – double bass
- Caleb Southern – Hammond organ, producer, engineer
- Andy Wallace – mixing

== Charts ==
Chart performance for "Brick"
Chart (1997–1998)	Peak position
Australia (ARIA)	13
Canada Alternative 30 (RPM)	15
Canada Top Singles (RPM)	12
UK Singles (Official Charts)	26
US Adult Pop Airplay (Billboard)	11
US Alternative Airplay (Billboard)	6
US Pop Airplay (Billboard)	17
US Radio Songs (Billboard)	19
