= The Unauthorized Biography of Reinhold Messner =

Studio album by Ben Folds Five
- Released: April 27, 1999
- Recorded: November 1998 – January 1999
- Studio: Sound City (Los Angeles); Grandmaster (Los Angeles); Water Music (Hoboken); RPM (New York City)
- Genre: Alternative rock; art rock; chamber pop
- Length: 40:30
- Label: 550, Caroline
- Producer: Caleb Southern

Ben Folds Five chronology
Naked Baby Photos (1998)	The Unauthorized Biography of Reinhold Messner (1999)	The Sound of the Life of the Mind (2012)

Singles from The Unauthorized Biography of Reinhold Messner
- 1. "Army" Released: April 12, 1999; 2. "Don't Change Your Plans" Released: 1999

The Unauthorized Biography of Reinhold Messner is the third studio album by Ben Folds Five, released on April 27, 1999. Produced by the band's usual collaborator, Caleb Southern, it represented a departure for the band from their usual pop-rock sound to material influenced by classical and chamber music, with darker, introspective lyrics on subjects such as regret, death, and loss of innocence. The band broke up shortly after the touring period of the album, and as a result the record was considered the final release from the trio until they reunited in 2011 and released The Sound of the Life of the Mind the following year.

== Title and packaging ==
The booklet included in the CD packaging includes a section about the title, where the band states they were "unaware of the existence of a living, breathing, and famous Reinhold Messner." During an interview with DJ Bruce Warren of WXPN radio shortly before the album's release, it was revealed to the band that he was real and that he was the first person to climb Mount Everest alone, as well as one member of the first two-man team to reach the summit without the use of bottled oxygen. They further stated in the booklet that "the credit goes to our cosmic collaborator on this album; coincidence."

The title of the album actually refers to a name used by the band's drummer Darren Jessee and his friends on fake IDs as teenagers—"Allegedly there were many 27 year old Reinholds who looked suspiciously adolescent, inhabiting the bars of Charlotte, North Carolina, in the late eighties." This is even referenced in the lyrics of the song "Regrets": "Seems the police had made a computer mistake; said there must be thousands like me with the same name."

Jessee was also the source of the visual identity of the album and its singles, with photography being credited to "The Jessee Archive". The album's packaging is styled after a biography, with the cover featuring a minimalist design of a man in sunglasses and a white suit and the booklet emulating yellow, tattered pages. Combined with the title, this has led to fans and reviewers viewing the album as a fictional biography about a character named Reinhold Messner, which is supported by the very introspective lyrics featured on the album.

== Music and lyrics ==
=== Writing and recording ===
The writing style of the album has been described by the band as a reactionary process, a result of the fatigue from playing in a bombastic rock band. Bassist Robert Sledge stated in an interview with MySpace's Front to Back that this fatigue naturally led to the band playing lighter material.

Lead singer and songwriter Ben Folds recalls being "tired of writing pop songs" and it led to changes in his writing style. As the new material was being written, Folds was "really into" chord progressions and voice leadings that he says kept finding their way into what he was writing. Naturally, the original demo for the album did not have traditional songs but rather was one long track containing all the musical ideas as a cohesive narrative. After some concerns from the label, Folds says, "Everyone took me out to lunch and asked me to split it up into separate songs instead of being one, and I remember Caleb saying – kind of implying that we were sort of in trouble pretty soon because nobody was hearing anything that sounded like real songs on the record."

While split into three separate tracks on the album, the songs "Hospital Song," "Army," and "Regrets" were originally written as a multi-part suite. The ending of "Hospital Song" leads directly into the beginning of "Army," whose final chords and lyrics are in turn used as the basis of the melody and chord progression in the verses of "Regrets." In addition, the final minute of "Regrets" reprises the solo in "Hospital Song."

The album also featured the first track where the songwriting was solely credited to the band's drummer, Darren Jessee, in the song "Magic". He contributed a demo of the song to a compilation album the year prior under the title "The Magic That Holds the Sky Up from the Ground" before the song was reworked into the piano trio format for the album.

The album was recorded in a three-month span. Unlike its predecessor, Whatever and Ever Amen, which was recorded at Folds's house in Chapel Hill, Reinhold Messner was recorded at several recording studios. It features a notable amount of overdubs on nearly every song, such as a heavy use of string sections, french horns, and a dual horn section in the lead single "Army". The album's tracklist was nearly final, but the label requested that the album have at least one 'fun song', so the band recorded "Your Redneck Past" to fulfill the label's request.

Due to the more considered approach of recording and arranging the album, the band left many songs on the cutting room floor. These songs included "Break Up at Food Court" and "Carrying Cathy". They also recorded an unfinished, Jessee-penned song entitled "Leather Jacket", which would later be contributed to a benefit album for Kosovar Refugees. Originally, "Don't Change Your Plans" was preceded by a long instrumental passage; Folds credits the album's late producer, Caleb Southern for helping edit down the song to its final product. He told an interviewer that Southern, "just cut it away and then all of a sudden it was this pop song . . . I didn't hear it like that at all, I just heard it as this little masterpiece thing.” In a Reddit AMA, he claimed Southern "cut the parts he didn't like and literally left the unwanted bits on the floor. I imagine the floor was cleaned and the recording went into the trash."

=== Lyrics ===
Both critics and the band members themselves have described The Unauthorized Biography of Reinhold Messner as, at least in part, a loose concept album, following the Reinhold Messner character through his life, heartache, hospitalization, and childhood memories.

In an interview with WXPN, Ben described how the album originally followed a more direct concept centered around sleep. Several sleep-related songs were cut off the final tracklist, but a few remained on the final album. During the WASO Live in Perth concert, Folds describes the song "Narcolepsy" as "about going to sleep, but it's about the kind of going to sleep that you can't help. I always related it to – there's a kind of narcolepsy where you're overstimulated in any kind of way, if you get really happy or excited or sad or whatever, you just go right to sleep; I realized that there are lots of guys out there that do this emotionally, including myself." The vocal portion of "Your Most Valuable Possession" consists of a message left on Folds' answering machine by his father, Dean Folds, while he was partially asleep. The album's final song "Lullabye" also describes the narrator's childhood experiences through the framing device of a lullaby, book-ending the album with songs about sleep.

On the Ben Folds iTunes Originals album, Folds explains that the song "Mess" is a "loss of innocence song" about having so much baggage that now you are unable to completely explain your history; "you've made a mess." The song follows a breakup, possibly the one that occurs in the previous track on the album, "Don't Change Your Plans", as the narrator refers to his ex's new partner, saying "he'll never care for you more than I do". Darren Jessee described his lyrics for the song "Magic" as a love song written to either a good friend or a composite of several people he knew who died.

"Your Redneck Past" is an entire song that was spun off from a throwaway lyric in Army about the narrator's redneck past. "Regrets" then follows up both tracks with the narrator spiraling further down into recalling memories and regrets all the way back to childhood. "Hospital Song", which refers to a real hospital: Forsyth Medical Center, located on Silas Creek Parkway in Winston-Salem; features the narrator lying awake in a hospital bed, depressed at the news that the doctor just gave him, crying "I don't believe that it's true." In the context of the album having a loose concept, this re-contextualizes many other songs on the album as the narrator simply revisiting memories from his past before an unspecified illness takes his life.

== Reception ==
Professional ratings
Review scores
Source	Rating
AllMusic	4/5 stars
Entertainment Weekly	B−
The Guardian	4/5 stars
Melody Maker	4/5 stars
NME	7/10
Pitchfork	3.3/10
Q	4/5 stars
Rolling Stone	3.5/5 stars
Spin	8/10
The Village Voice	B

The record was given generally positive reviews, with Allmusic saying that it's the band's willingness "to forge a unique sound that makes The Unauthorized Biography of Reinhold Messner such an interesting album to listen to. There is care to these songs and, what's even more significant and fresh, there is also intelligence." Robert Christgau gave the album a B in his Consumer Guide, while cautioning: "What jerks melody inflicts on us. With no connection to any human virtue of substance, the catchy tune ushers all manner of unpleasant personality traits into our lives. And if this smart aleck is less dangerous than Fred Durst, he also does less with what he was given. ... [H]is basic program remains revenge-of-the-nerd. He always knew he was smarter than whoever and ever amen. He always knew there were people who'd admire him just because he was clever. And unfortunately, he was right." Brent DiCrescenzo of Pitchfork notably gave the album a significantly more negative review than other publications, rating it a 3.3/10 and saying "this trio has run out of ideas."

== Legacy ==
Speaking in 2005, six years after its release, Folds partially attributed the album to the initial break-up of Ben Folds Five, stating: "We were having a really hard time before we split, the Reinhold Messner period was financially and career-wise a disaster." Folds stated in the iTunes Originals interview about the album: "The 'Reinhold Messner' record was – I think in a way it shows how naïve we were, and idealistic we were as a band to think that the music business would care about us extending ourselves and developing and being something different; because that record was a failure – in almost every way that you can fail. As a commercial release it didn't sell up to anybody’s expectations, critically it got sort of lukewarm reviews; and yet, I think that was our best work. I think it's a great record."

The band reunited to play the album in its entirety at the UNC Memorial Hall in Chapel Hill, North Carolina on September 18, 2008. This one-off concert appearance was part of the MySpace "Front to Back" series, in which artists play an entire album live. The band were briefly joined on stage by Ben's father, Dean Folds, who read a transcript of his voice mail message that is used in the album song "Your Most Valuable Possession". A concert film of the show was later released on the Front to Back website, which spliced in new interviews from both the band and colleagues, discussing the album and their experience with MySpace.

The lead single, "Army", was featured in the Viceland comedy series Nirvanna the Band the Show as the end credits theme song.

In 2017, the album was reissued on a 180-gram vinyl. The reissue was sourced from the original mix reels and sported a new master by Kevin Gray.

== Track listing ==
All tracks are written by Ben Folds, except where noted.

The Unauthorized Biography of Reinhold Messner track listing
No.	Title	Writer(s)	Length
1.	"Narcolepsy"		5:24
2.	"Don't Change Your Plans"		5:11
3.	"Mess"		4:03
4.	"Magic"	Darren Jessee	4:02
5.	"Hospital Song"		2:05
6.	"Army"		3:25
7.	"Your Redneck Past"		3:43
8.	"Your Most Valuable Possession"	Folds; Jessee; Robert Sledge; Dean Folds; Caleb Southern	1:55
9.	"Regrets"		4:07
10.	"Jane"		2:42
11.	"Lullabye"	Folds; Anna Goodman	3:53
Total length:			40:30

The Unauthorized Biography of Reinhold Messner – Japanese edition (bonus track)
No.	Title	Writer(s)	Length
12.	"Birds"	Sledge	2:09
Total length:			42:39

The Unauthorized Biography of Reinhold Messner – Australian edition (bonus track)
No.	Title	Length
12.	"(Theme From) Dr. Pyser"	3:14
Total length:		43:44

== Personnel ==
Ben Folds Five

- Ben Folds - vocals, piano, keyboards
- Robert Sledge - bass guitar, synthesizer, double bass, background vocals
- Darren Jessee - drums, percussion, background vocals

Additional personnel

- Antoine Silverman - violin (tracks 1, 2, 3, 4, 9, 11)
- Mark Feldman - violin (tracks 1, 2, 3, 4, 9, 11)
- Lorenza Ponce - violin (tracks 1, 2, 3, 4, 9, 11)
- Jane Scarpantoni - cello (tracks 1, 2, 3, 4, 9, 11)
- Ken Mosher - alto & baritone saxophone (tracks 6, 11)
- Tom Maxwell - tenor saxophone (tracks 6, 11)
- Paul Shapiro - tenor saxophone (track 6)
- Frank London - trumpet (track 6)
- John Mark Painter - flugelhorn (tracks 1, 2, 6), valve trombone (track 6)
- Dean Folds - answering machine message on "Your Most Valuable Possession"

== Production ==
- Producer: Caleb Southern
- Mixing: Andy Wallace
- Additional Editing: Roger Lian

== Charts ==
Album - Billboard (United States)

Year	Chart	Position
1999	The Billboard 200	35
1999	Top Internet Albums	3

Singles - Billboard (United States)

Year	Single	Chart	Position
1999	"Army"	Modern Rock Tracks	17
