= Ben Folds Five (album) =

Studio album by Ben Folds Five
- Released: July 25, 1995
- Recorded: February 1995
- Studios: Wave Castle, North Carolina
- Genres: Rock; power pop; alternative rock; cabaret
- Length: 46:14
- Label: Passenger
- Producer: Caleb Southern

Ben Folds Five chronology
Ben Folds Five (1995)	Whatever and Ever Amen (1997)

Singles from Ben Folds Five
- 1. "Jackson Cannery" Released: 1994; 2. "Underground" Released: April 8, 1996; 3. "Where's Summer B.?" Released: June 7, 1996; 4. "Philosophy" Released: 1996; 5. "Uncle Walter" Released: 1996

Ben Folds Five is the debut studio album by American alternative rock band Ben Folds Five, released on July 25, 1995. A non-traditional rock album, it featured a sound that excluded lead guitars completely. The album was released on the small independent label Passenger Records, owned by Caroline Records, a subsidiary of Virgin/EMI. Ben Folds Five received positive reviews, and spawned five singles. Although it failed to chart, it sparked a bidding war that was eventually won by Sony Music. Several live versions of songs originally released on Ben Folds Five reappeared later as b-sides or on compilations.

In September 2026, a 30th anniversary edition of the album was released including a bonus disc, Shelved First Attempt, featuring the band's original demo recording of the album with an alternate track listing.

== Reception ==
Professional ratings
Review scores
Source	Rating
AllMusic	4.5/5 stars
Chicago Tribune	3.5/4 stars
Drowned in Sound	9/10
The Encyclopedia of Popular Music	4/5 stars
Entertainment Weekly	B+
Houston Chronicle	4/5 stars
NME	9/10
Pitchfork	9.6/10
Rolling Stone	3/5 stars
The Rolling Stone Album Guide	4/5 stars

Ben Folds Five received positive reviews from NME, Rolling Stone, Pitchfork, and Entertainment Weekly. Michael Gallucci praised the album as "a potent, and extremely fun collection of postmodern rock ditties that comes off as a pleasantly workable combination of Tin Pan Alley showmanship, Todd Rundgren-style power pop, and myriad alt-rock sensibilities." Robert Christgau of The Village Voice selected "Boxing" as a "choice cut". The Record concluded that the "performances are often mannered, the arrangements busy and tiring, and Folds's Joe Jackson Redux isn't anything close to the Bold New Sound it has been trumpeted as."

== Track listing ==
All lyrics are written by Ben Folds, with additional lyricists noted.

No.	Title	Lyrics	Length
1.	"Jackson Cannery"		3:23
2.	"Philosophy"		4:36
3.	"Julianne"		2:30
4.	"Where's Summer B.?"	Darren Jessee	4:07
5.	"Alice Childress"	Anna Goodman	4:34
6.	"Underground"		4:11
7.	"Sports & Wine"		2:58
8.	"Uncle Walter"		3:51
9.	"Best Imitation of Myself"		2:38
10.	"Video"		4:07
11.	"The Last Polka"	Goodman	4:34
12.	"Boxing"		4:45

== Personnel ==
- Ben Folds – piano, vocals
- Darren Jessee – drums, vocals, percussion
- Robert Sledge – bass, vocals
- Ted Ehrhard – violin, viola on "Boxing"
- Chris Eubank – cello on "Boxing"

=== Production ===
- Producer: Caleb Southern
- Mixing: Marc Becker
- Photography: Alexandria Searls

== Charts ==
=== Weekly charts ===
Chart	Position
Australian ARIA Albums Chart	37
Japanese Oricon Albums Chart	72

=== Certifications ===
Region	Certification
Japan (RIAJ)	Gold
