= Lounge-A-Palooza =

Compilation album
- Released: October 7, 1997
- Genres: Jazz, lounge
- Length: 45:48
- Label: Hollywood

Lounge-A-Palooza is a compilation album issued in 1997 by Hollywood Records. Released to capitalize on the 1990s lounge music revival, it features cover versions of songs, including classic lounge hits performed by contemporary artists and 1990s hits covered by lounge singers.

== Critical reception ==
Professional ratings
Review scores
Source	Rating
Uncut	2/5 stars

The album received mixed reviews, as various critics identified different tracks as standouts and disappointments. Salon said it made "a grand attempt to attract both trendies and true believers," and Weekly Wire said it was "all over the map." The A.V. Club called it "a pleasant surprise", while AllMusic said it was "a mixed bag," and Entertainment Weekly concluded it "avoids lounge's smarmy irony while retaining its sense of fun."

== Track listing ==
No.	Title	Artist(s)	Writer(s)	Original artist	Length
1.	"Mini Skirt"	Combustible Edison / Esquivel	Esquivel	Esquivel	2:32
2.	"This Guy's in Love with You"	Fastball	Burt Bacharach / Hal David	Herb Alpert	3:31
3.	"She Don't Use Jelly"	Ben Folds Five	The Flaming Lips	The Flaming Lips	4:13
4.	"A Rose Is a Rose"	Poe	Mark Z. Danielewski	—	4:01
5.	"Black Hole Sun"	Steve and Eydie	Chris Cornell	Soundgarden	4:33
6.	"The Girl from Ipanema"	Pizzicato Five	Norman Gimbel / Antônio Carlos Jobim / Vinícius de Moraes	Astrud Gilberto	3:47
7.	"Zaz Turned Blue"	PJ Harvey / Eric Drew Feldman	David Was / Don Was	Was (Not Was)	5:23
8.	"I'm Not in Love"	Fun Lovin' Criminals	Graham Gouldman / Eric Stewart	10cc	4:36
9.	"Wichita Lineman"	Glen Campbell & Michelle Shocked with Texas Tornados	Jimmy Webb	Glen Campbell	4:04
10.	"Witchcraft"	Edwyn Collins	Cy Coleman / Carolyn Leigh	Frank Sinatra	4:58
11.	"Love Will Keep Us Together"	Flea / Jimmy Scott	Howard Greenfield / Neil Sedaka	Captain & Tennille	4:14
12.	"Music to Watch Girls By"	James Taylor Quartet	Sid Ramin / Tony Velona	Bob Crewe	3:39
13.	"The Good Life"	Cassandra Wilson	Sacha Distel / Jack Reardon	Tony Bennett	5:12
14.	"Robert Goulet (On the River Nile)"	Chris Ballew	Chris Ballew / David Thiele	—	2:05

== See also ==
- 1997 in music
