= Lonely Avenue (Ben Folds and Nick Hornby album) =

Studio album by Ben Folds and Nick Hornby
- Released: September 28, 2010
- Genre: Alternative rock
- Length: 43:37
- Label: Nonesuch
- Producer: Ben Folds

Ben Folds chronology
| Ben Folds Presents: University A Cappella! (2009) | Lonely Avenue (2010) | The Best Imitation of Myself: A Retrospective (2011) |

Professional ratings
Aggregate scores
| Source | Rating |
|---|---|
| Metacritic | 63/100 |
Review scores
| Source | Rating |
| AllMusic | 3.5/5 stars |
| The A.V. Club | B |
| Chicago Tribune | 2/4 stars |
| The Independent | 4/5 stars |
| musicOMH | 4/5 stars |
| PopMatters | 7/10 stars |
| Rolling Stone | 2/5 stars |
| Slant Magazine | 4/5 stars |
| Spin | 7/10 |
| Uncut | 2/5 stars |

Lonely Avenue is a collaboration album by American singer-songwriter Ben Folds and English novelist Nick Hornby, and was released in the United States of America on September 28, 2010 by Nonesuch Records.

The album contains eleven songs featuring music by Folds with lyrics by Hornby. "From Above", the first single, was released on August 6. Some of the songs are named after Levi Johnston, Doc Pomus, and Saskia Hamilton. "Your Dogs" was used as the opening theme for the CBS sitcom $#*! My Dad Says.

== Release ==
The album was promoted by the single "From Above" released in 2010. The song features guest vocals from Australian singer-songwriter Kate Miller-Heidke.

The music video for the single is animated, with the characters from the song being drawn in a book and the characters move around on the page, acting out the story of the song. The video was directed by Julius Pretite of The Simpsons.

== Track listing ==
All lyrics are written by Nick Hornby; all music is composed by Ben Folds.

Lonely Avenue
| No. | Title | Length |
|---|---|---|
| 1. | "A Working Day" | 1:51 |
| 2. | "Picture Window" | 3:42 |
| 3. | "Levi Johnston's Blues" | 5:16 |
| 4. | "Doc Pomus" | 4:14 |
| 5. | "Your Dogs" | 3:23 |
| 6. | "Practical Amanda" | 3:52 |
| 7. | "Claire's Ninth" | 3:50 |
| 8. | "Password" | 5:21 |
| 9. | "From Above" | 4:04 |
| 10. | "Saskia Hamilton" | 3:06 |
| 11. | "Belinda" | 6:13 |

Amazon bonus track
| No. | Title | Length |
|---|---|---|
| 1. | "Christian Life" | 3:34 |

iTunes bonus tracks
| No. | Title | Length |
|---|---|---|
| 1. | "Picture Window" (Pop version) | 4:04 |
| 2. | "Things You Think" (featuring Pomplamoose) | 3:14 |
| 3. | "Lonely Avenue Trailer" (music video) | 7:15 |

== Personnel ==
- Ben Folds – vocals, piano, bass, drums, Roland Juno, Moog, Hammond, clav, acoustic guitars, wind chimes, ARP string ensemble, percussion, handclaps
- Joe Costa – handclaps
- Kate Miller-Heidke – vocals
- Keir Nuttall – primal screams
- Jared Reynolds – bass, backing vocals
- Jack Jezioro, Joel Reist – bass
- Sam Smith – drums, backing vocals
- Chad Chapin – acoustic guitar, primal percussion, percussion, glockenspiel, backing vocals
- Andrew Higley – Wurlitzer, Fender Rhodes, Roland Jupiter, Roland Juno, Moog, French horn, backing vocals
- Paul Buckmaster – string arrangement, conductor
- David Davidson, David Angell, Carolyn Bailey, Christian Teal, Conni Ellisor, Connie Heard, Elisabeth Small, Karen Winkelmann, Kristina Siemer, Mary Kathryn Vanosdale, Stefan Petrescu, Wei Tsun Chang – violin
- Kristin Wilkinson – viola, contractor
- Chris Farrell, Kathryn Plummer, Monisa Angell – viola
- John Catchings, Anthony LaMarchina, Kirsten Greer, Sarighani Reist – cello
- Beth Beeson, Jennifer Kummer – French horn
- Jeff Bailey, Steve Patrick – trumpet
- Prentiss Hobbs, Roy Agee – trombone
- David Loucky – bass trombone
