= Battle of Who Could Care Less =

Single by Ben Folds Five

from the album Whatever and Ever Amen
- Released: February 27, 1997
- Genre: Piano rock
- Label: Epic
- Songwriter: Ben Folds

Ben Folds Five singles chronology
"Uncle Walter" (1996)	"Battle of Who Could Care Less" (1997)	"Kate" (1997)

Music video
- "Battle of Who Could Care Less" on YouTube

"Battle of Who Could Care Less" is a song performed by Ben Folds Five, released as part of their 1997 album Whatever and Ever Amen, written by Ben Folds. It peaked at #26 in the UK Singles Chart, and enjoyed widespread radio airplay in the summer of 1997 in the UK, with the music video being regularly shown on both MTV and VH1.

== Track listing ==
1. "Battle of Who Could Care Less" - 3:17
2. "Hava Nagila" - 1:33
3. "For Those of Y'all Who Wear Fanny Packs" - 6:05
