= Anna Goodman (musician) =

American songwriter

Anna Harris Goodman is an American songwriter who was married to Ben Folds from 1987 to 1992. She was best friends with Folds since they were schoolchildren, and encouraged him to play piano at a young age. She was the manager of his band Majosha in the late 1980s and early 1990s. They were married at a young age in their early 20s, and often collaborated on songwriting. She co-wrote several Ben Folds Five songs including:

- "Alice Childress" (Ben Folds Five)
- "The Last Polka" (Ben Folds Five)
- "Kate" (Whatever and Ever Amen)
- "Smoke" (Whatever and Ever Amen)
- "Lullabye" (The Unauthorized Biography of Reinhold Messner)

Goodman was also a long-time member of Sin-é Cafe's resident band Porkchop, which was composed of Beavis and Butt-Head directors and producers, Mike de Sève and Brian Mulroney; Ryan Adams guitarist J. P. Bowersock; Dale Burleyson; Gaijin a Go-Go's Phil Maynes; Brad Brown and Chris LaFrenz.
