= PIAS UK Distribution =

British record label

[PIAS] UK Distribution
- Company type: Music Record Distribution
- Industry: Music
- Founded: 1993 (as Vital)
- Headquarters: London, United Kingdom
- Parent: [PIAS] Entertainment Group
- Subsidiaries: PIAS Digital Distribution; Integral
- Website: PIAS UK Distribution

[PIAS] UK Distribution is the distribution arm of the [PIAS] Entertainment Group and is the United Kingdom's largest independent sales, marketing and distribution company. Founded in March 1994 as Vital Distribution, Ltd., and renamed in January 2008, [PIAS] UK represents over 100 record labels from around the world. With offices in London and Dublin, Ireland, [PIAS] UK has played a significant role in the European and worldwide successes of some of the most well-known independent artists, including Oasis, The White Stripes, The Strokes, Moby, and others.

To aid in the distribution and management of various smaller labels, [PIAS] UK created two distinct units. Established in 2004 as Vital-PIAS Digital, the [PIAS] Digital unit manages over 200 labels from the U.K. through widespread digital distribution. In 2006, [PIAS] UK developed and launched Integral, a label development company that provides the marketing structure and backing for smaller labels and rights holders to introduce, establish and promote acts on their own.

== Labels ==
- INVADA Records
- Beggars Group/XL Recordings
- Big Brother Recordings
- Brownswood Recordings
- Defected Records
- Domino Records
- Ninja Tune Records
- Wall of Sound
- Warp Records
