= Kate (Ben Folds Five song) =

Single by Ben Folds Five

from the album Whatever and Ever Amen
- Released: 1997
- Genre: Piano rock
- Label: Epic
- Songwriter(s): Ben Folds, Darren Jessee, Anna Goodman

Ben Folds Five singles chronology
"Battle of Who Could Care Less" (1997)	"Kate" (1997)	"One Angry Dwarf & 200 Solemn Faces" (1997)

"Kate" is a song performed by Ben Folds Five released on their 1997 album Whatever and Ever Amen. Written by Ben Folds, Darren Jessee, and Folds's first wife, Anna Goodman, the song follows a love-struck man who is infatuated with a girl named "Kate". It peaked at #39 on the UK Singles Chart.

== Music video ==
The video features the three band members in a bed. The entire video was shot in one take, from a camera over the bed, facing straight down.
