= Ziggy's =

American music venue & bar in North Carolina

Coordinates: 36.1048°N 80.2461°W

Ziggy's was a live music venue and bar in Winston-Salem, North Carolina. The venue in Baity Street closed after Thanksgiving in 2007. On August 5, 2011, Ziggy's reopened in Winston-Salem, in a 14,000 sq ft space on the corner of 8th and Trade St. in the Downtown Arts District. That venue closed down on February 21, 2016. It reopened in 2022, where it relocated to High Point.

A former residence, Ziggy's became one of the premier club venues in the South. A wide variety of bands were hosted, with styles including Reggae, Rock, Blues, Hip Hop, and Country. Artists who have performed at Ziggy's include Thirty Seconds to Mars, Phish, Dave Matthews Band, The Black Crowes, Keller Williams, Slipknot, Deftones The Wailers, Andrew W.K., Perpetual Groove, Steel Pulse, Rusted Root, Jump Little Children, Ben Folds Five, Vertical Horizon, Hawthorne Heights, Emery, Anberlin, Mutemath, Insane Clown Posse, Twiztid, Lamb of God, Axe Murder Boyz, Blaze Ya Dead Homie, Mat Kearney, Turbonegro, and Saliva. In February 2003, Great White played at Ziggy's with their full pyrotechnic stage show mere days before the same effects would ignite the deadly fire that killed over 100 people at The Station nightclub in West Warwick, Rhode Island. In December 2004, Athenaeum played their final show on Ziggy's stage. Many great Misfit shows, Megadeth, Drain STH, and Danzig performed in the early years at the older location.

== History ==
Ziggy's was rumored to have been founded by Ziggy Marley, though it was actually named after Wake Forest alumnus John 'Ziggy' Ziglinski after a stint as 'The White Horse Tavern' in the early 1970s. There has been an urban legend that Ziggy Marley helped to keep the venue open with a generous monetary donation in the early 90s. Marley has regularly performed at the venue, openly praising and identifying with the "Roots-Rock-Reggae" philosophy displayed on the seven-foot square Ziggy's logo at the rear of the main stage. Most employees claimed that the big tabby that called the place home was the club's namesake, not the other way around. Jay Stephens, a former Wake Forest athlete himself, bought Ziggy's in the mid-1990s and owned it until it closed.

== Ziggy's By The Sea ==
A sister club, Ziggy's by the Sea, operated in Atlantic Beach, North Carolina until 2005.

On July, 3rd, 2013, after an 8-year hiatus, a new version and operation took on the same name, Ziggy's by the Sea, and reopened on the corner of 2nd & Market in Wilmington, North Carolina. It had a capacity of 750 and closed in 2016.
