= Passenger Records =

American record label

- Parent company: Virgin Records
- Founded: 1994
- Genre: Adult alternative
- Country of origin: United States

Passenger Records was a New York City-based boutique record label that released music by adult album alternative (or Triple-A) artists. A subsidiary of Caroline Records, it was owned by Virgin Records/EMI. Its albums were distributed by Caroline Distribution in the US and Virgin or a variety of smaller labels throughout Europe, Australia, Japan and other markets. Passenger most notably represented Ben Folds Five for Caroline, releasing the band's 1995 self-titled debut album. Other artists represented by the label include the defunct Philadelphia band The Low Road.

In a 1997 interview, after his band had signed with Sony's Epic/550 label and released their second album Whatever and Ever Amen, Ben Folds spoke about both Passenger and The Low Road:

A curious angle to some of Ben Folds' success actually might have to do with our own ex-local band The Low Road. Both bands were signed to Caroline Records' new, Adult Alternative subsidiary, Passenger.

Folds was sorry to hear of the Low Road's break-up.

"That's really a shame... It's always arguable whether someone got the best treatment when it comes to a record company. To be fair, Passenger signed them and put records out for them. With a band like The Low Road — they're not a rock band, or very mainstream — they're not going to get that chance very often."

According to Folds, Ben Folds Five was signed because of The Low Road, and ironically might have been part of the reason The Low Road was ultimately dropped.

"The Low Road was the blueprint of what Passenger Records was. [Caroline Records'] Chaz Molins' idea was, 'I'd like to sign a band like The Low Road and make it for like an older Triple A [Adult Album Alternative] crowd... and they signed us...Really quickly, we picked up with younger people and modern-rock stations — the sort of thing Caroline was used to marketing. That could have screwed up The Low Road to a certain extent because Passenger just kind of abandoned all their ideas about being Triple A. So, I don't think we did them any favors."

The Passenger Records label was dissolved in the mid-to-late 1990s. Artists either continued their contracts on with Caroline Records or signed with other labels.
