= Whatever and Ever Amen =

Studio album by Ben Folds Five
- Released: March 18, 1997
- Recorded: September–October 1996, Chapel Hill, North Carolina
- Genre: Alternative rock
- Length: 49:20
- Labels: 550; Caroline; Epic
- Producers: Ben Folds; Caleb Southern

Ben Folds Five chronology
Ben Folds Five (1995)	Whatever and Ever Amen (1997)	Naked Baby Photos (1998)

Singles from Whatever and Ever Amen
- 1. "Battle of Who Could Care Less" Released: February 27, 1997; 2. "Kate" Released: 1997; 3. "One Angry Dwarf and 200 Solemn Faces" Released: 1997; 4. "Brick" Released: November 21, 1997; 5. "Song for the Dumped" Released: 1998

Professional ratings
Review scores
Source	Rating
AllMusic	4/5 stars
Chicago Tribune	3/4 stars
The Encyclopedia of Popular Music	5/5 stars
Entertainment Weekly	A
Los Angeles Times	3/4 stars
NME	6/10
Pitchfork	7.6/10
Q	4/5 stars
Rolling Stone	3.5/5 stars
Spin	9/10

Whatever and Ever Amen is the second album by Ben Folds Five, released on March 18, 1997. Three singles were released from the album, including the lead single, "Battle of Who Could Care Less", which received significant airplay on alternative radio and on MTV, and peaked at number 26 on the UK Singles Chart and number 22 on the Billboard Modern Rock Tracks chart, and the band's biggest hit, "Brick", which was a top-40 song in numerous countries.

A remaster was made available on March 22, 2005. All of the extra tracks had been previously released (as b-sides, soundtrack contributions, etc.) except for a cover of the Buggles song "Video Killed the Radio Star", which is a staple of Ben Folds Five's live show.

== Title, recording and cover ==
=== Title ===
While recording the album, Folds told the Sheffield Electronic Press in November 1996 that the album would likely either be titled Cigarette or The Little Girl With Teeth. The title Whatever and Ever Amen comes from a line in the song "Battle of Who Could Care Less".

=== Cover ===
The album's original cover featured individual photos of Folds, Sledge, and Jessee, along with a hand-drawn Ben Folds Five logo, and hand-drawn "Whatever and Ever Amen" text with two hands pointing away from each other forming the W, all in front of a blue background with a pattern. The cover of the 2005 remastered version moved their band logo and album title from the top left corner to the center and added a fourth photo of all three bandmates sitting together, lifted from the front cover for Japanese issues of the original album.

=== Recording ===
The album was recorded in the front room of a house in Chapel Hill, North Carolina. Folds said, "You can't go for perfection in a house. The spiritual comet of the song comes by every so often and lots of technical things are going to be going wrong when that happens. Our producer, Caleb is very good at knowing when the ghost blew through the house. People don't buy records for the accuracy." The first release for their new label, Epic, Folds said the record company did not get to hear the recording until it was finished, saying, "they knew what they were getting into."

== Track notes ==
Near the end of the Nerdist podcast #132, Folds mentioned that the lyrics for "Cigarette" were taken from a newspaper article he claimed was about a man, Fred Jones, who "felt conflicted" after finding his wife had a changed personality due to a brain tumor, on the basis that she was not the same person he had married. (The article, from a 1991 edition of The Tennessean, is actually about the implanted epidural catheter procedure that brought Jones and his wife renewed peace after her years of pain.) The "sequel" track, "Fred Jones Part 2", is on Folds' first solo album, Rockin' the Suburbs.

The track "Steven's Last Night in Town" was written about Ben Folds' friend Stephen Short, a Grammy-Award-winning record producer and manager.

An early mix of "Song for the Dumped" appeared on the soundtrack album for the movie Mr. Wrong, but the song did not actually appear in the movie. The soundtrack was released on February 6, 1996, a full year before the release of "Whatever and Ever Amen".

=== Hidden tracks ===
The first pressing of Whatever and Ever Amen features a clip of an actual argument in the studio between Folds, Sledge and Jessee, inserted between "Brick" and "Song for the Dumped". Speaking to The Shrubbery in 1999, Folds said that the clip "was a painfully documented real argument that kept bringing up bad feelings. We decided to get rid of it and let the first pressings be collectors ... Better to keep the band together. It was ugly."

The first pressing featured another hidden track, on the album's last track, "Evaporated", and in the negative space of track 1 on the Digitally Remastered version. The clip is at a live concert, where band roadie Leo Overtoom yells out, "I've got your hidden track right here: Ben Folds is a fuckin' asshole!" A short video clip of this is featured in the video "A Video Portrait" released alongside the album.

== Legacy ==
Nick Hornby writes one of his essays in the book 31 Songs about "Smoke".

== Track listing ==
Original release
No.	Title	Writer(s)	Length
1.	"One Angry Dwarf and 200 Solemn Faces"	Ben Folds	3:52
2.	"Fair"	Folds	5:55
3.	"Brick"	Folds, Darren Jessee	4:43
4.	"Song for the Dumped"	Folds, Jessee	3:41
5.	"Selfless, Cold, and Composed"	Folds	6:10
6.	"Kate"	Folds, Jessee, Anna Goodman	3:14
7.	"Smoke"	Folds, Goodman	4:52
8.	"Cigarette"	Folds	1:38
9.	"Steven's Last Night in Town"	Folds	3:27
10.	"Battle of Who Could Care Less"	Folds	3:16
11.	"Missing the War"	Folds	4:19
12.	"Evaporated"	Folds	4:28

Bonus tracks on remastered version
No.	Title	Writer(s)	Length
13.	"Video Killed the Radio Star"	Geoff Downes, Trevor Horn, Bruce Woolley	3:40
14.	"For All the Pretty People"	Robert Sledge	3:21
15.	"Mitchell Lane"	Folds, Jessee	3:40
16.	"Theme from 'Dr. Pyser'" (Brendan O'Brien Studio version)	Folds	3:14
17.	"Air"	Folds, Jessee, Sledge	3:20
18.	"She Don't Use Jelly" (Lounge-A-Palooza version)	Wayne Coyne	4:11
19.	"Song for the Dumped (金返せ)" (Japanese version, translates to 'Give me back my money')	Folds, Jessee	5:03

== Personnel ==
=== The band ===
- Ben Folds – piano, lead vocals, electric piano, melodica
- Darren Jessee – drums, percussion, backing vocals
- Robert Sledge – bass guitar, double bass, backing vocals

=== Additional musicians ===
- John Catchings – cello on 5 and 12
- Alicia Svigals – violin on 9
- Matt Darriau – clarinet on 9
- Frank London – trumpet on 9
- Caleb Southern – Hammond organ on 3
- Norwood Cheek – synthesizer space sound on 1

=== Production ===
- Caleb Southern – producer, engineer
- Ben Folds – producer, engineer
- Andy Wallace – mixing
- Steve Sisco – mixing assistant
- Howie Weinberg – mastering
- John Mark Painter – string arrangements
- Leigh Smiler – cover design
- Chris Stamey – Pro-Tools
- The Klezmatics – special contributor

== Charts ==
=== Weekly charts ===
Weekly chart performance for Whatever and Ever Amen
Chart (1997–1998)	Peak position
Australian ARIA Albums Chart	8
Canadian RPM Albums Chart	48
Japanese Oricon Albums Chart	6
UK Albums Chart	30
US Billboard 200	42

=== Year-end charts ===
Year-end chart performance for Whatever and Ever Amen
Chart (1997)	Position
Japanese Albums Chart	156
Chart (1998)	Position
Australian Albums Chart	48
US Billboard 200	138

== Certifications ==
Certifications for Whatever and Ever Amen
Region	Certification	Certified units/sales
Australia (ARIA)	Platinum	70,000^{^}
Canada (Music Canada)	Gold	50,000^{^}
Japan (RIAJ)	Platinum	200,000^{^}
United States (RIAA)	Platinum	1,000,000^{^}
^{^} Shipments figures based on certification alone.
