= Ben Folds Five =

American alternative rock band

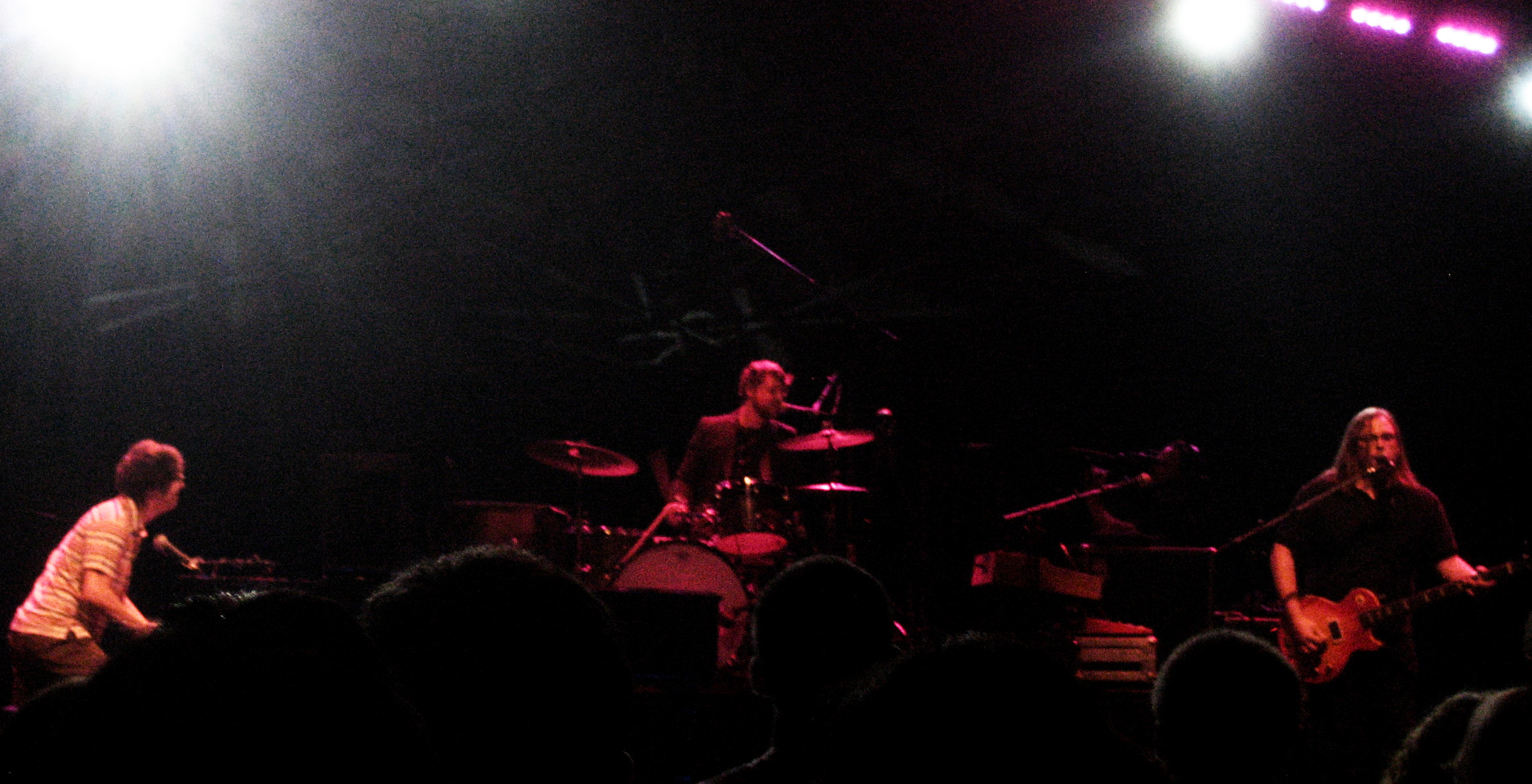
- Ben Folds Five performing at Chapel Hill, NC in September 2008

Background information
- Origin: Chapel Hill, North Carolina, U.S.
- Genres: Alternative rock; power pop
- Years active: 1993–2000; 2008; 2011–2013; 2023; 2026–present
- Labels: Passenger; Caroline; Virgin; 550; Epic; Sony; Imaveepee
- Members: Ben Folds; Robert Sledge; Darren Jessee

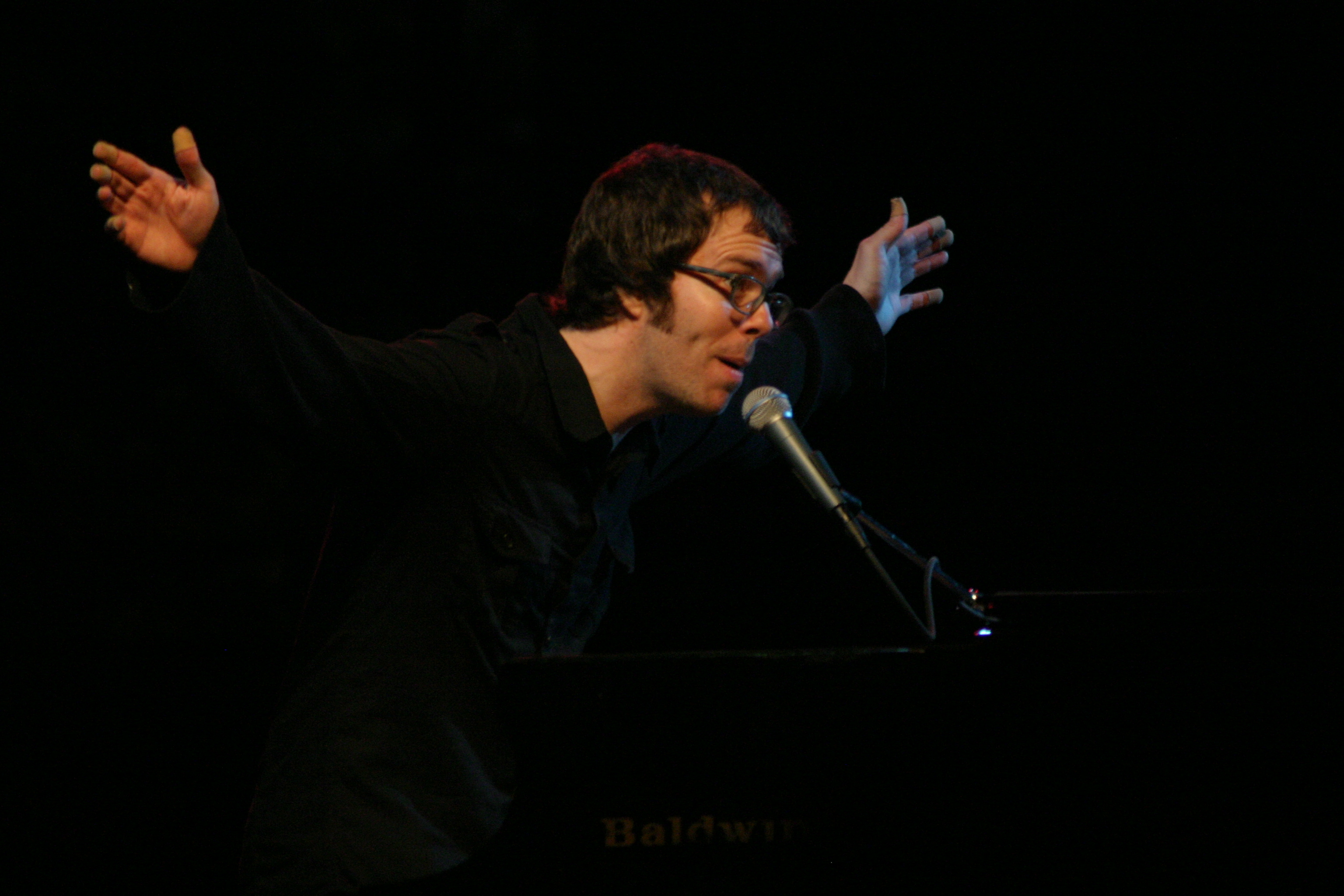
Ben Folds performing, Knoxville, Tennessee, 2006

Ben Folds Five is an American alternative rock trio formed in 1993 in Chapel Hill, North Carolina. The group is composed of Ben Folds (lead vocals, piano), Robert Sledge (bass guitar, backing vocals) and Darren Jessee (drums, backing vocals). Known for their distinct piano-driven sound with no lead or rhythm guitars, the group achieved success in the alternative, indie and pop music scenes. Their single "Brick" from the second album, Whatever and Ever Amen (1997), gained airplay on many mainstream radio stations.

During their first seven years, the band released three studio records, a compilation of B-sides and outtakes, and eight singles. They also contributed to a number of soundtracks and compilations. Ben Folds Five disbanded in October 2000, but reunited in 2011, and released their fourth album, The Sound of the Life of the Mind, in 2012, before disbanding again in 2013.

On July 7, 2026, they announced their plan to tour in support a 30th anniversary edition of their debut album.

== History ==
=== 1993–2000 ===
Ben Folds Five was formed in 1993 in Chapel Hill by Ben Folds. They were a trio in spite of their name, which was chosen for a joke, and because Folds thought it sounded better than Ben Folds Three. Folds once described their music as "punk rock for sissies," a reaction to the angst prevalent in '90s rock.

Their first radio single was "Underground" from their self-titled debut album, released in 1995 on Caroline Records. The band's biggest success was the single "Brick" from their second album, Whatever and Ever Amen, released in 1997. It was followed by the more somber and jazz-based 1999 album, The Unauthorized Biography of Reinhold Messner. The group contributed an outtake from the Reinhold Messner sessions, titled "Leather Jacket", to the 1999 benefit album, No Boundaries: A Benefit for the Kosovar Refugees.

The band's final released recording was a cover of Steely Dan's "Barrytown" for the Me, Myself & Irene soundtrack. The band had begun work on a fourth studio album, but following the worldwide tour in support of The Unauthorized Biography of Reinhold Messner, the band "amicably" broke up in October 2000. Tracks from the sessions later emerged in solo projects.

=== After the break-up (2001–2011) ===
Folds went on to pursue a successful solo career, releasing his debut album Rockin' the Suburbs in 2001, followed by Songs for Silverman in 2005, Way to Normal in 2008, and Lonely Avenue in collaboration with novelist Nick Hornby in 2010. Unlike his work in Ben Folds Five, Folds sometimes included guitars in his solo work. He produced and arranged actor William Shatner's second album Has Been, co-writing the majority of the songs with Shatner. Folds also contributed songs to the soundtracks for the animated movies Hoodwinked! and Over the Hedge, as well as forming the one-off side project The Bens (with Ben Lee and Ben Kweller) in 2003.

Jessee formed the indie band Hotel Lights in 2004, with his songs featured in television and film. Jessee released three studio albums for Bar/None Records in this time – including Hotel Lights in 2006, Firecracker People in 2008, and Girl Graffiti in 2011.

Sledge played with International Orange until the group disbanded in 2005. He later became the bass player in the three-piece Chapel Hill band Surrender Human, with Matt McMichaels from the Mayflies USA.

=== Reunions (2008–present) ===
Ben Folds Five made a one-off concert appearance in September 2008 at the UNC Memorial Hall in Chapel Hill as part of the MySpace "Front to Back" series, in which artists play an entire album live. The band played its then-final album, The Unauthorized Biography of Reinhold Messner, and were briefly joined on stage by Ben's father, Dean Folds, who read a transcript of his voice mail message that is used in the album song "Your Most Valuable Possession", encoring with some of the songs from their first two albums.

In 2011, Ben Folds Five reunited to record three tracks for Ben Folds' The Best Imitation of Myself: A Retrospective. They made their first live appearance in four years as one of the headliners of the 2012 Mountain Jam festival. They made further appearances at that year's 2012 Bonnaroo and Summerfest festivals.

The band's fourth studio album, The Sound of the Life of the Mind was released in September 2012, supported by the single "Do It Anyway", with a video featuring Anna Kendrick, Rob Corddry, and the cast of Fraggle Rock. A tour of the US, the UK, Australia and Ireland followed across the remainder of 2012.

In June 2013, the trio released their first live album, titled Live. During that year, Ben Folds Five toured with the Barenaked Ladies and Guster, before entering a hiatus that ultimately became permanent. Folds resumed his solo career, releasing the yMusic collaboration So There in 2015, the album What Matters Most in 2023, the Christmas-themed album Sleigher in 2024, music for two Peanuts specials for Apple TV (Snoopy Presents: It's the Small Things, Charlie Brown in 2022 and Snoopy Presents: A Summer Musical in 2024), and continuing to tour extensively. Folds also served as the first Artistic Advisor for the National Symphony Orchestra from May 2017 through his resignation in February 2025. Jessee, meanwhile, released a new album with Hotel Lights in 2016, entitled Get Your Hand in My Hand, before releasing three solo albums: 2018's The Jane, Room 217, 2020's Remover, and 2023's Central Bridge.

Caleb Southern – the producer of the band's first three albums and considered the "fourth member" of the band by Folds – died on July 6, 2023. The band briefly reunited for a concert in tribute to Southern on August 28, 2023, at the Cat's Cradle in Chapel Hill, performing five songs.

In July 2026, alongside the announcement of the 30th anniversary special edition of their debut album Ben Folds Five, it was also revealed that the band would reunite for their first tour in more than 13 years, though Folds stated the band would not be releasing new music. The 30th anniversary box set was released on September 4, along with a bonus disc containing Original Shelved Attempt, the early version of their debut that was scrapped.

== Discography ==
Ben Folds Five discography
- Studio albums: 4
- Live albums: 1
- Compilation albums: 2
- Singles: 9
- Video albums: 1

=== Studio albums ===
List of studio albums, with selected details, chart positions and certifications
Title	Album details	Peak chart positions						Sales	Certifications
Title	Album details	US	AUS	CAN	JPN	SCO	UK	Sales	Certifications
Ben Folds Five	Released: August 8, 1995; Label: Passenger, Caroline	—	37	—	72	—	—	US: 195,000	RIAJ: Gold; BPI: Silver
Whatever and Ever Amen	Released: March 18, 1997; Label: 550, Caroline, Epic	42	8	48	6	38	30	US: 1,100,000	RIAA: Platinum; ARIA: Platinum; MC: Gold; RIAJ: Platinum; BPI: Gold
The Unauthorized Biography of Reinhold Messner	Released: April 27, 1999; Label: 550, Caroline, Epic	35	5	35	17	32	22	US: 299,000	
The Sound of the Life of the Mind	Released: September 18, 2012; Label: ImaVeePee	10	24	—	72	48	40	US: 67,000	

=== Live albums ===
List of live albums, with selected details
Title	Album details
Live	Released: May 31, 2013; Label:
The Complete Sessions at West 54th	Released: July 10, 2018; Label: Real Gone, Epic

=== Compilation albums ===
List of compilation albums, with selected details
Title	Album details
Naked Baby Photos	Released: January 13, 1998; Label: Caroline
Playlist: The Very Best of Ben Folds Five	Released: April 10, 2015; Label: Epic

=== Singles ===
List of singles, with selected chart positions
Title	Year	Peak chart positions						Album
Title	Year	US Radio	US Alt	AUS	CAN	JPN	UK	Album
"Jackson Cannery"	1994	—	—	—	—	—	—	Ben Folds Five
"Underground"	1996	—	—	—	—	—	37	Ben Folds Five
"Where's Summer B.?"	1996	—	—	—	—	—	76	Ben Folds Five
"Philosophy"	1996	—	—	—	—	—	—	Ben Folds Five
"Uncle Walter"	1996	—	—	—	—	—	—	Ben Folds Five
"Battle of Who Could Care Less"	1997	—	22	149	—	—	26	Whatever and Ever Amen
"One Angry Dwarf and 200 Solemn Faces"	1997	—	—	134	—	—	—	Whatever and Ever Amen
"Kate"	1997	—	—	—	—	—	39	Whatever and Ever Amen
"Brick"	1997	19	6	13	12	—	26	Whatever and Ever Amen
"Song for the Dumped"	1998	—	23	73	—	—	—	Whatever and Ever Amen
"Army"	1999	—	17	65	—	—	28	The Unauthorized Biography of Reinhold Messner
"Don't Change Your Plans"	1999	—	—	—	—	—	—	The Unauthorized Biography of Reinhold Messner
"Do It Anyway"	2012	—	—	—	—	88	—	The Sound of the Life of the Mind
"—" denotes singles that did not chart.

=== DVDs ===
- Ben Folds Five – The Complete Sessions at West 54th (1999) – Epic Music Video

=== Other appearances ===
- Mr. Wrong soundtrack (1996) – Contributed "Song for the Dumped"
- The Truth About Cats & Dogs soundtrack (1996) – Contributed "Bad Idea"
- KCRW Rare On Air, Volume 3 (1997) – Contributed "Alice Childress"
- Lounge-A-Palooza (1997) – Contributed cover of "She Don't Use Jelly" by The Flaming Lips
- MegaHits Dance Party, Volume 2 (1998) – Contributed "Brick (3AM Dance Remix)"
- Triple J Hottest 100, Volume 5 (1998) – Contributed "One Angry Dwarf & 200 Solemn Faces"
- Sabrina, the Teenage Witch – The Album soundtrack (1998) – Contributed "Kate"
- Godzilla soundtrack (1998) – Contributed "Air"
- Burt Bacharach: One Amazing Night (1998) – Contributed "Raindrops Keep Fallin' On My Head"
- Teleconned, Volume 1: We Want The Airwaves (1998) – Contributed "Theme From Dr. Pyser"
- No Boundaries: A Benefit for the Kosovar Refugees benefit album (1999) – Contributed "Leather Jacket"
- Me, Myself & Irene soundtrack (2000) – Contributed a cover of "Barrytown" by Steely Dan from their third studio album Pretzel Logic
- Songs for Summer benefit album (2000) – Contributed "Where's Summer B.?"
- Non Stop '90s Rock (2001) – Contributed "Brick"
- Songbook (2002) – Contributed "Smoke"
