= Caleb Southern =

American musician, record producer and computer science lecturer

- Born: Caleb August Southern; December 26, 1969; Chapel Hill, North Carolina, USA
- Died: July 6, 2023 (aged 53); Atlanta, Georgia, USA
- Education: University of North Carolina at Chapel Hill (BMath and BCS)
- Occupations: Record producer; arranger; musician
- Known for: Working with: Ben Folds Five; Archers of Loaf
- Spouse: Josephine "Jo" Worthington (m. 2014)

Caleb August Southern (December 26, 1969 – July 6, 2023) was an American musician, record producer and computer science lecturer at the Georgia Institute of Technology. He was referred to as the "fourth member" of Ben Folds Five.

== Early life ==
Caleb August Southern was born on December 26, 1969, in Chapel Hill, North Carolina, to David Southern and Susan Naumoff. He attended Jordan High School, where he formed a band called "The Ledbetters". They played a gig at Cat's Cradle in 1988.

Southern completed his bachelor's in mathematics and computer science at the University of North Carolina at Chapel Hill in 1996, having paused his education while touring with Ben Folds Five.

== Career ==
In the early 1990s, Caleb founded Kraptone Studios, where he produced for Ben Folds Five and Archers of Loaf. As of 2002, he was a member of Partners Against Crime, District 5. Ben Folds has called him the "fourth member" of Ben Folds Five. He collaborated with Ben Folds on their album Fear of Pop, as well.

Southern began a PhD at Georgia Tech in 2010, focusing on human–computer interaction for mobile devices. He was awarded a National Science Foundation Graduate Fellowship in 2012.

== Personal life and death ==
Southern was married to Josephine Worthington. They lived together in Atlanta, Georgia, where he died on July 6, 2023, at the age of 53.

== Select production credits ==
- Archers of Loaf, Icky Mettle (1993)
- Ben Folds Five, Ben Folds Five (1995)
- Ben Folds Five, Whatever and Ever Amen (1997)
- Ben Folds Five, The Unauthorized Biography of Reinhold Messner (1999)

== Select publications ==
- Southern, Caleb; Clawson, James; Frey, Brian; Abowd, Gregory; Romero, Mario (2012-09-21). "An evaluation of BrailleTouch". Proceedings of the 14th international conference on Human-computer interaction with mobile devices and services. MobileHCI '12. New York, NY, USA: Association for Computing Machinery. pp. 317–326. doi:10.1145/2371574.2371623. ISBN 978-1-4503-1105-2. S2CID 7090994.
- Frey, Brian; Southern, Caleb; Romero, Mario (2011). "BrailleTouch: Mobile Texting for the Visually Impaired". In Stephanidis, Constantine (ed.). Universal Access in Human-Computer Interaction. Context Diversity. Lecture Notes in Computer Science. Vol. 6767. Berlin, Heidelberg: Springer. pp. 19–25. doi:10.1007/978-3-642-21666-4_3. ISBN 978-3-642-21666-4. S2CID 1437801.
- Romero, Mario; Frey, Brian; Southern, Caleb; Abowd, Gregory D. (2011-08-30). "BrailleTouch". Proceedings of the 13th International Conference on Human Computer Interaction with Mobile Devices and Services. MobileHCI '11. New York, NY, USA: Association for Computing Machinery. pp. 707–709. doi:10.1145/2037373.2037491. ISBN 978-1-4503-0541-9. S2CID 41547754.
- Zhang, Cheng; Yang, Junrui; Southern, Caleb; Starner, Thad E.; Abowd, Gregory D. (2016-09-12). "WatchOut". Proceedings of the 2016 ACM International Symposium on Wearable Computers. ISWC '16. New York, NY, USA: Association for Computing Machinery. pp. 136–143. doi:10.1145/2971763.2971775. ISBN 978-1-4503-4460-9. S2CID 15096573.
