= Darren Jessee =

American musician (born 1971)

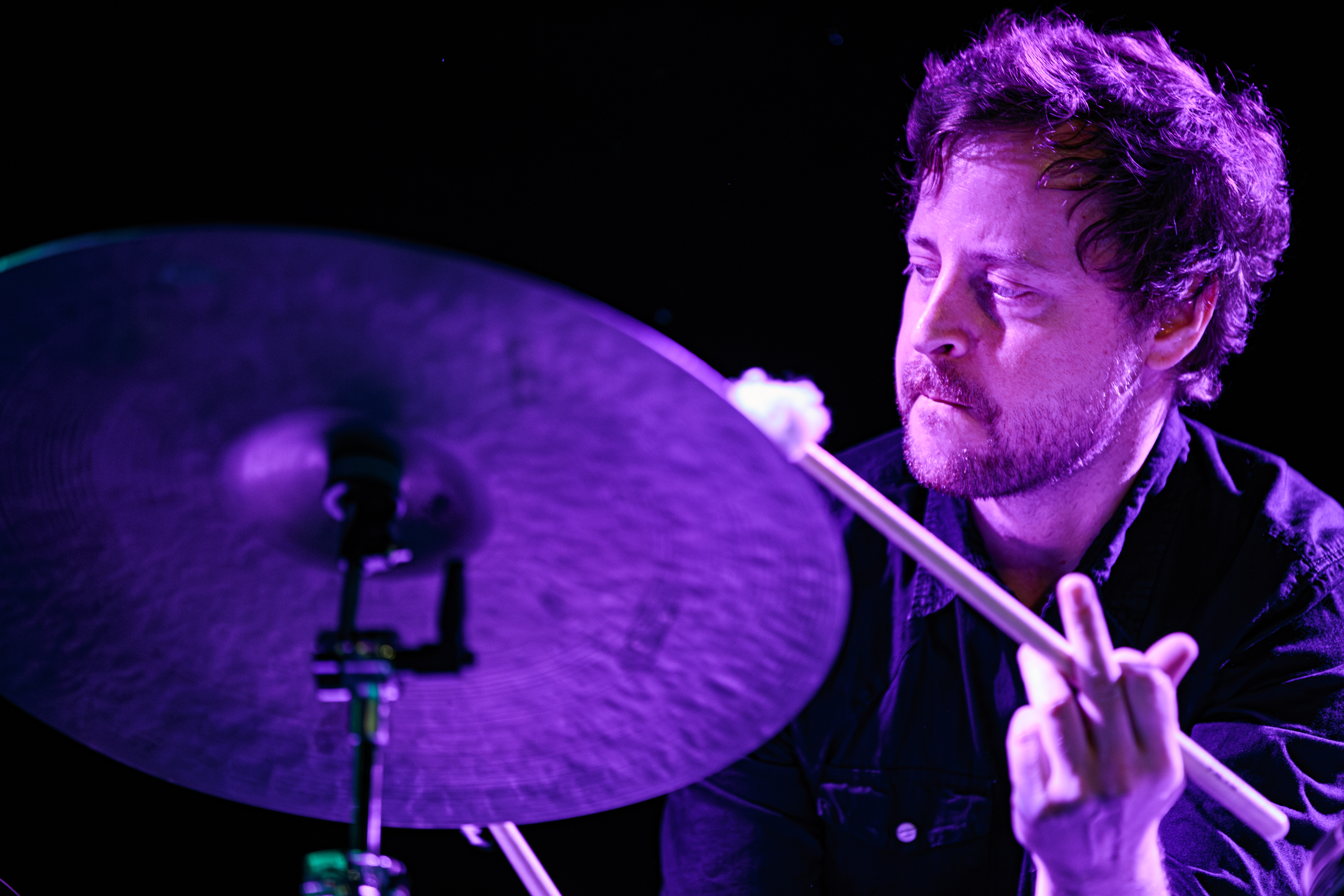
- Jessee performing in 2014

Background information
- Born: Darren Michael Jessee; April 8, 1971 (age 55); Houston, Texas
- Genres: Folk; alternative rock; acoustic
- Occupation: Musician
- Instruments: Drums; vocals; guitar; piano
- Years active: 1994–present
- Labels: Sony; Bar/None
- Member of: Hotel Lights; Ben Folds Five
- Website: darrenjessee.com

Darren Michael Jessee (born April 8, 1971) is an American drummer and singer-songwriter who is the drummer in the alternative rock trio Ben Folds Five. He has also worked as an instrumentalist for Sharon Van Etten and Hiss Golden Messenger and released three solo albums and four albums as singer and songwriter for indie band Hotel Lights. His first solo album, The Jane, Room 217, was released on August 24, 2018, to near-universal acclaim from critics.

Jessee formed indie band Hotel Lights in 2004, with whom he has recorded four studio albums and an extended play. Ben Folds has credited the Jessee-penned chorus for "Brick" as the missing element to a song that he had tried to compose for a long time.

Jessee can also be heard drumming on the song "Strangest Thing" from The War on Drugs' 2017 album A Deeper Understanding, Hiss Golden Messenger's Hallelujah Anyhow (2017), and Josh Rouse's album Under Cold Blue Stars, released in 2002.

== Discography ==
Darren Jessee

- The Jane, Room 217 (2018)
- Remover (2020)
- Central Bridge (2023)

Ben Folds Five

- Ben Folds Five (1995)
- Whatever and Ever Amen (1997)
- Naked Baby Photos (1998)
- The Unauthorized Biography of Reinhold Messner (1999)
- The Sound of the Life of the Mind (2012)

Hotel Lights

- Hotel Lights (2004/2006)
- Goodnightgoodmorning (2005)
- Firecracker People (2008)
- Girl Graffiti (2011)
- Get Your Hand in My Hand (2016)

== Songwriter ==
Hotel Lights is the project name for singer-songwriter Darren Jessee. Notable Jessee songwriting contributions for Ben Folds Five include:

- "Magic" (Jessee) – The Unauthorized Biography of Reinhold Messner
- "Sky High" (Jessee) – The Sound of the Life of the Mind
- "Brick" (Folds / Jessee) – Whatever and Ever Amen
- "Song for the Dumped" (Folds / Jessee) – Whatever and Ever Amen
- "Kate" (Folds / Jessee /Anna Goodman) – Whatever and Ever Amen
- "Amelia Bright" (Jessee) – unreleased track performed live by the band 1999–2000; later featured on the Hotel Lights album Firecracker People. A 2000 studio version of the track by Ben Folds Five was included on Folds' retrospective album The Best Imitation of Myself: A Retrospective (2011)
- "Leather Jacket" (Jessee) – No Boundaries: A Benefit for the Kosovar Refugees
- "Wandering" (Folds / Jessee) – Speed Graphic (Note: this is a Ben Folds solo EP)
- "Stumblin' Home Winter Blues" (Jessee) – originally released on Hotel Lights' self-titled debut album in 2006; later recorded by Ben Folds Five for The Best Imitation of Myself
