= Robert Sledge =

American musician

- Born: Robert Ewell Sledge; March 9, 1968 (age 58)
- Genres: Rock, alternative rock
- Occupation: Musician
- Instruments: Vocals, bass guitar, synthesizer, double bass
- Years active: 1992–present
- Member of: Ben Folds Five

Robert Ewell Sledge (born March 9, 1968) is an American musician. He played bass guitar in the alternative rock trio Ben Folds Five.

== Biography ==
Robert Sledge began playing bass guitar at the age of eleven. His brother was playing guitar at his house so he also learned how to play the guitar at the same time. Before playing with Ben Folds Five he was bassist for bands Toxic Popsickle and Lexx Luthor (with Godsmack's Sully Erna).

== Ben Folds Five ==
Sledge was a founding member of the piano-rock trio Ben Folds Five. He was the bass player for the group as well a backing vocalist. During the tour in support of their album The Unauthorized Biography of Reinhold Messner, Sledge began to use several synthesizers on stage, as well as his typical electric and acoustic basses.

Sledge uses a Big Muff pedal to provide a layer of fuzz distortion on top of his typical bass tone. He played a Hamer Blitz Bass during the early years of Ben Folds Five. He later switched to a Fender Jazz Bass to record Whatever and Ever Amen, while playing his Gibson and Epiphone Les Paul basses in live shows from that time to the present. Sledge had a sponsorship from Epiphone for his use of the Les Paul Bass, which can be seen in the Ben Folds Five performance on Sessions at West 54th. He also plays an upright double bass for several songs, including "Brick".

== Post-Ben Folds Five ==
After Ben Folds Five broke up, Sledge performed with the short-lived rock group Brother Seeker, a band he formed with former Squirrel Nut Zippers members Tom Maxwell and Ken Mosher. According to John D. Luerssen's Rivers' Edge: The Weezer Story, Sledge was considered to replace Mikey Welsh as the new Weezer bassist in 2001 but instead Scott Shriner took the job.

He later joined the band International Orange, as a songwriter, bassist and vocalist. International Orange broke up in 2005.

Sledge currently lives in Chapel Hill, North Carolina, where he gives music lessons and plays in local rock bands "Organ Failure", and "Surrender Human."

== Personal life ==
Sledge lives in Chapel Hill with his wife and son.
