= Ben Folds discography =

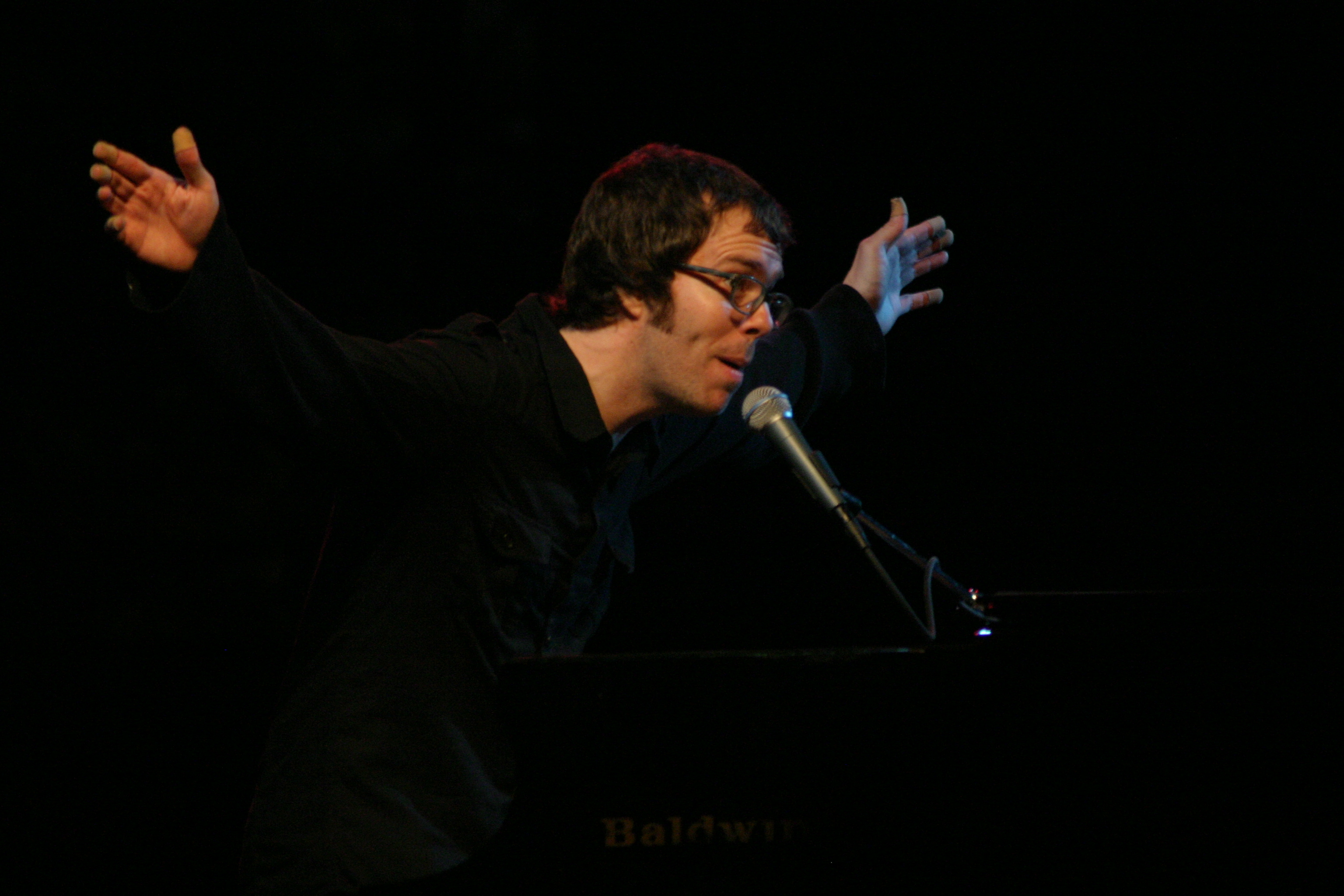
- Folds performing in Knoxville, Tennessee in 2006
- Studio albums: 8
- Extended plays: 3
- Live albums: 6
- Compilation albums: 10
- Singles: 22
- Video albums: 2

The discography of Ben Folds, an American singer-songwriter, consists of eight studio albums (including three collaborative albums), six live albums, 10 compilation albums, two video albums, eight extended plays, and 22 singles. See also Ben Folds Five discography.

== Albums ==
=== Studio albums ===
List of albums, with selected chart positions
| Title | Album details | Peak chart positions | | | |
| Title | Album details | US | AUS | JPN | UK |
|---|---|---|---|---|---|
| Rockin' the Suburbs | Released: September 11, 2001; Label: Epic; Formats: CD, LP | 42 | 18 | 28 | 73 |
| Songs for Silverman | Released: April 26, 2005; Label: Epic, Sony; Formats: CD, LP, digital download | 13 | 9 | 20 | 65 |
| Way to Normal | Released: September 30, 2008; Label: Epic; Formats: CD, LP, digital download | 11 | 25 | 30 | 70 |
| What Matters Most | Released: June 2, 2023; Label: New West; Formats: CD, LP, digital download | — (Note: What Matters Most did not enter the US Billboard 200, but did peak at number 13 on the Top Album Sales chart.) | — | — | — |
| Sleigher | Released: October 25, 2024; Label: New West; Formats: CD, LP, digital download | — | — | — | — |

==== Collaborative albums ====
List of collaborative albums, with selected chart positions
| Title | Album details | Peak chart positions | |
| Title | Album details | JPN | UK |
|---|---|---|---|
| Ben Folds Presents: University A Cappella! (with various artists) | Released: April 28, 2009; Label: Sony; Formats: CD, digital download | — | — |
| Lonely Avenue (with Nick Hornby) | Released: September 24, 2010; Label: Nonesuch; Formats: CD, digital download | 95 | 89 |
| So There (with yMusic) | Released: September 11, 2015; Label: New West; Formats: CD, digital download | — | 63 |
"—" denotes a recording that did not chart or was not released in that territory.

=== Live albums ===
List of live albums, with selected chart positions
| Title | Album details | Peak chart positions | |
| Title | Album details | US | UK |
|---|---|---|---|
| Ben Folds Live | Released: October 8, 2002; Label: Sony; Formats: CD | 60 | 109 |
| Live at Tower Records | Released: June 7, 2005; Label: Epic; Formats: CD, digital download | — | — |
| Motor City (Live at Detroit, MI 10/9/08) | Released: October 9, 2008; Label: Sony; Formats: Digital download | — | — |
| Live in Dallas (10/23/08) | Released: October 23, 2008; Label: Sony; Formats: Digital download | — | — |
| The Sound of Last Night... This Morning | Released: March 31, 2009; Label: Sony; Formats: Digital download | — | — |
| Ben Folds Live with The National Symphony Orchestra | Released: July 4, 2025; Label: John F. Kennedy Center for the Performing Arts; Formats: Digital download | — | — |
"—" denotes a recording that did not chart or was not released in that territory.

=== Compilation albums ===
List of compilation albums, with selected chart positions
| Title | Album details | Peak chart positions | | |
| Title | Album details | US | JPN | UK |
|---|---|---|---|---|
| Songs for Goldfish | Released: May 3, 2005; Label: Epic; Formats: CD, digital download | — | 146 | — |
| iTunes Originals – Ben Folds | Released: August 30, 2005; Label: Sony BMG; Formats: Digital download | — | — | — |
| Supersunnyspeedgraphic, the LP | Released: October 24, 2006; Label: Epic; Formats: CD, digital download | 114 | — | 174 |
| Stems and Seeds | Released: February 10, 2009; Label: Epic; Formats: CD, digital download [Disc 2 only, as "Way to Normal (Expanded Edition)" with 8 additional live tracks] | — | — | — |
| Ben Folds File: Complete Best of Ben Folds Five and Ben Folds | Released: February 25, 2009; Label: Sony; Formats: CD | — | 38 | — |
| The Best Imitation of Myself: A Retrospective | Released: October 11, 2011; Label: Legacy; Formats: CD, digital download | — | 179 | 100 |
| Fifty-Five Vault | Released: October 11, 2011; Label: Epic; Formats: Digital download | — | — | — |
| Vault, Vol. 1 (1992–1997) | Released: December 23, 2011; Label: Sony; Formats: Digital download | — | — | — |
| Vault, Vol. 2 (1998–2003) | Released: December 23, 2011; Label: Sony; Formats: Digital download | — | — | — |
| Vault, Vol. 3 (2004–2011) | Released: December 23, 2011; Label: Sony; Formats: Digital download | — | — | — |
"—" denotes a recording that did not chart or was not released in that territory.

=== Video albums ===
List of video albums
| Title | Album details |
|---|---|
| Ben Folds and WASO Live in Perth (with the West Australian Symphony Orchestra) | Released: December 6, 2005; Label: Sony; Formats: DVD |
| Ben Folds Live at MySpace | Released: February 20, 2007; Label: Sony; Formats: DVD |

=== Extended plays ===
List of extended plays
| Title | EP details | Peak chart positions |
| Title | EP details | JPN |
|---|---|---|
| Speed Graphic | Released: July 22, 2003; Label: Attacked by Plastic; Formats: CD, digital download | 84 |
| Sunny 16 | Released: September 30, 2003; Label: Attacked by Plastic; Formats: CD, digital download | 52 |
| Super D | Released: August 24, 2004; Label: Attacked by Plastic; Formats: CD, digital download | 53 |
"—" denotes a recording that did not chart or was not released in that territory.

== Singles ==
=== As lead artist ===
List of singles, with selected chart positions, showing year released and album name
| Title | Year | Peak chart positions | | | | | | | Album |
| Title | Year | US | US AAA | US Adult | US Alt. | AUS | JPN | UK | Album |
|---|---|---|---|---|---|---|---|---|---|
| "Rockin' the Suburbs" | 2001 | — | — | — | 28 | 58 | — | 53 | Rockin' the Suburbs |
| "Still Fighting It" | 2002 | — | — | — | — | 70 | — | — | Rockin' the Suburbs |
| "Tiny Dancer" | 2002 | — | — | — | — | — | — | — | Ben Folds Live |
| "Eddie Walker" | 2002 | — | — | — | — | — | — | — | Ben Folds Live |
| "Bizarre Christmas Incident" | 2002 | — | — | — | — | — | — | — | Ben Folds Live (Japanese Version Only) |
| "Adelaide" | 2005 | — | — | — | — | — | — | — | Super D |
| "Bitches Ain't Shit" | 2005 | 71 | — | — | — | — | — | — | Supersunnyspeedgraphic, The LP |
| "Landed" | 2005 | 77 | — | 40 | — | 55 | — | — | Songs for Silverman |
| "Jesusland" | 2005 | — | — | — | — | — | — | — | Songs for Silverman |
| "Bastard" | 2005 | — | — | — | — | — | — | — | Songs for Silverman |
| "Hiroshima (B B B Benny Hit His Head)" | 2008 | — | — | — | — | — | 41 | — | Way to Normal |
| "You Don't Know Me" (featuring Regina Spektor) | 2008 | — | 28 | — | — | 84 | — | — | Way to Normal |
| "From Above" (with Nick Hornby) | 2010 | — | — | — | — | — | — | — | Lonely Avenue |
| "Phone in a Pool" (with yMusic) | 2015 | — | 28 | — | — | — | — | — | So There |
| "Mister Peepers" | 2018 | — | — | — | — | — | — | — | Non-album singles |
| "2020" | 2020 | — | — | — | — | — | — | — | Non-album singles |
| "It's the Small Things, Charlie Brown" (for Snoopy Presents: It's the Small Things, Charlie Brown) | 2022 | — | — | — | — | — | — | — | Non-album singles |
| "Winslow Gardens" | 2023 | — | — | — | — | — | — | — | What Matters Most |
| "Exhausting Lover" | 2023 | — | 20 | — | — | — | — | — | What Matters Most |
| "Back to Anonymous" | 2023 | — | — | — | — | — | — | — | What Matters Most |
| "The Christmas Song" | 2024 | — | — | — | — | — | — | — | Sleigher |
| "We Could Have This" (featuring Lindsey Kraft) | 2024 | — | — | — | — | — | — | — | Sleigher |
"—" denotes a recording that did not chart or was not released in that territory.

== Guest appearances ==
List of guest appearances, with other performing artists, showing year released and album name
| Title | Year | Other artist(s) | Album |
|---|---|---|---|
| "Lonely Christmas Eve" | 2000 | —N/a | How the Grinch Stole Christmas soundtrack |
| "Golden Slumbers" | 2002 | —N/a | I Am Sam soundtrack |
| "Rockin' the Suburbs" (Live on The Panel version) | 2002 | —N/a | The Latest Collection: Music Live from the Panel |
| "Doctor My Eyes" | 2002 | —N/a | The Banger Sisters soundtrack |
| "Red Is Blue" | 2005 | —N/a | Hoodwinked! soundtrack |
| "Family of Me" | 2006 | —N/a | Over the Hedge soundtrack |
| "Heist" | 2006 | —N/a | Over the Hedge soundtrack |
| "Lost in the Supermarket" | 2006 | —N/a | Over the Hedge soundtrack |
| "Still" | 2006 | —N/a | Over the Hedge soundtrack |
| "Rockin' the Suburbs (Over the Hedge Version)" | 2006 | William Shatner | Over the Hedge soundtrack |
| "Still (Reprise)" | 2006 | —N/a | Over the Hedge soundtrack |
| "Such Great Heights" | 2007 | —N/a | Like a Version: Volume Three |
| "Astronaut: A Short History of Nearly Nothing" | 2008 | Amanda Palmer, Zoë Keating | Who Killed Amanda Palmer |
| "Blake Says" | 2008 | Amanda Palmer, Zoë Keating | Who Killed Amanda Palmer |
| "Strength Through Music" | 2008 | Amanda Palmer, Strindberg | Who Killed Amanda Palmer |
| "Guitar Hero" | 2008 | Amanda Palmer, East Bay Ray | Who Killed Amanda Palmer |
| "Oasis" | 2008 | Amanda Palmer, Jared Reynolds | Who Killed Amanda Palmer |
| "Runs in the Family" | 2008 | Amanda Palmer | Who Killed Amanda Palmer |
| "Sleazy" | 2011 | —N/a | Download to Donate: Tsunami Relief |
| "Ass Crack Bandit" | 2014 | —N/a | Basic Intergluteal Numismatics, an episode of Community |
| "Kevin" | 2016 | Gracie Folds | Pink Elephant |
| "Dear Theodosia" | 2016 | Regina Spektor | The Hamilton Mixtape |
| "It's the Small Things, Charlie Brown" | 2022 | —N/a | Snoopy Presents: It's the Small Things, Charlie Brown |
| So Fragile, So Blue | 2024 | William Shatner, National Symphony Orchestra, and Steven Reineke | So Fragile, So Blue |
| "When We Were Light" | 2025 | —N/a | Snoopy Presents: A Summer Musical |
| "Look Up, Charlie Brown" | 2025 | —N/a | Snoopy Presents: A Summer Musical |
| "Leave it Better" | 2025 | —N/a | Snoopy Presents: A Summer Musical |

== See also ==
- Shut Up and Listen to Majosha
- Fear of Pop: Volume 1
- The Bens (EP)
