= Supersunnyspeedgraphic, the LP =

Compilation album by Ben Folds
- Released: October 24, 2006
- Genre: Alternative rock
- Length: 51 minutes
- Label: Epic
- Producers: John Mark Painter & Ben Folds

Ben Folds chronology
iTunes Originals (2005)	Supersunnyspeedgraphic, the LP (2006)	Way to Normal (2008)

Professional ratings
Review scores
Source	Rating
Allmusic	3/5 stars
Drowned in Sound	(7/10)
Melodic.net	3/5 stars
musicOMH	4/5 stars
Punknews.org	3.5/5 stars
The Skinny	3/5 stars

Supersunnyspeedgraphic, the LP is a remixed compilation album by Ben Folds which was released on 24 October 2006, by Epic Records in the United States. The album's name is taken from Folds' EPs Speed Graphic, Sunny 16, and Super D. Music from those EPs make up the majority of the album, alongside other tracks released since Folds' last album: a cover of the Dr. Dre track "Bitches Ain't Shit", the song "Bruised" from The Bens, and the reprise version of "Still" from the Over the Hedge soundtrack.

Due to an outcry on many sites (including Folds' own MySpace webpage) that Folds was releasing this "LP" of previously released material as a marketing ploy, he released a statement concerning the new release. He clarified that, while they are the same songs from the EP collection, almost every track would utilize added overlays and instrumentation (strings, for instance) or different takes of the song. From an email to his mailing list: "the new LP would be boasting remastering and tweaking that was completed at Ben's own studio in Nashville, TN'".

The second U.S. single "Bitches Ain't Shit" made it onto the Hot 100 as well as the Hot Digital Tracks chart.

== Track listing ==
All tracks are written by Ben Folds, except where noted.

No.	Title	Lyrics	Length
1.	"In Between Days"	The Cure	2:54
2.	"All U Can Eat"		3:04
3.	"Songs of Love"	The Divine Comedy	3:38
4.	"There's Always Someone Cooler Than You"		4:11
5.	"Learn to Live With What You Are"		4:27
6.	"Bitches Ain't Shit" (featuring Mr. Reynolds and Lin-Z)	Dr. Dre	4:10
7.	"Adelaide"		3:12
8.	"Rent a Cop"		5:08
9.	"Get Your Hands Off My Woman" (featuring Corn Mo)	The Darkness	3:35
10.	"Bruised" (featuring Ben Lee and Ben Kweller)		4:34
11.	"Dog"		4:27
12.	"Still" (Ends at 6:09, includes "Bitches Ain't Shit (Reprise)" as a hidden track (begins after 10 seconds of silence).)		7:46
