= Ben Folds Live at MySpace =

2007 DVD by Ben Folds Five

Video by Ben Folds
- Released: February 20, 2007
- Recorded: October 24, 2006
- Genre: Rock, Alternative rock, Piano rock, Power pop, Indie rock
- Length: 60 Minutes
- Label: Sony/MySpace
- Producer: Ben Folds

Ben Folds Live at MySpace is a DVD featuring a live performance by singer-songwriter and pianist Ben Folds. Filmed on October 24, 2006, at Folds' personal studio in Nashville, Tennessee, this event was the social network MySpace.com's first ever live webcast. It launched "Hey, Play This", an exclusive series of in-studio all-request concerts webcast for free through the MySpace website.

The hour-long performance kicked off promotional touring for the release of the 2006 album Supersunnyspeedgraphic, the LP. It features a cross-section of songs from the breadth of Folds' career, from his time fronting the band Ben Folds Five to his solo career, as well as covers of songs by The Postal Service and Dr. Dre.

A highlight of the show is an appearance by comedian Greg Roman in the persona of Titler, a cross-dressing version of Adolf Hitler, singing "Cross the Line," a parody of the Johnny Cash hit "Walk the Line".

== Track listing ==
1. It's Alright With God (Instrumental)
2. There's Always Someone Cooler Than You
3. Learn to Live With What You Are
4. Kate
5. Bastard
6. Jesusland
7. All U Can Eat
8. I Cross the Line (performed by Titler, aka Greg Roman)
9. Such Great Heights (The Postal Service Cover)
10. Army
11. Rockin' the Suburbs
12. Bitches Ain't Shit (Dr. Dre Cover)

== Personnel ==
- Ben Folds - vocals, piano and other keyboards
- Jared Reynolds - bass, background vocals
- Lindsay Jamieson - drums, background vocals
