= Gracie Folds =

Australian-American musician

- Born: Gracie Scott Folds; 23 July 1999 (age 27); Adelaide, South Australia
- Genres: Indie; piano pop
- Occupation: Singer-songwriter
- Instruments: Vocals; piano; guitar
- Years active: 2016–present
- Website: therealgraciefolds.bandcamp.com

Gracie Scott Folds (born 23 July 1999) is an Australian and American singer-songwriter. Folds is the daughter of musician Ben Folds. She released her first two EPs, demos and Pink Elephant in 2016.

== Early life and career ==
Folds was born in Adelaide, South Australia, to musician Ben Folds and Frally Hynes on July 23, 1999, almost three hours after her twin brother, Louis. She was the namesake for her father's song "Gracie", off of the album Songs for Silverman (2005).

In her late teens, Gracie made some music with her father. She performed an a cappella version of his song "Effington" with Ben and her brother for the album University A Cappella! (2009). She also provided harmony vocals for his 2015 song "So There".

In adulthood, she moved to Los Angeles, California, and began making music in 2016, touring with her father and yMusic. In August, she released her debut EP, Pink Elephant, which featured her father performing hand claps. In September, she released demos, featuring demos of two more songs.

In 2018, she was featured on Unstabile's song "Balloons", off the album Steep.

In July 2020, she performed "Sprained Ankle" by Julien Baker with the National Symphony Orchestra at the Kennedy Center for "DECLASSIFIED: Ben Folds Presents", filling in for Baker, introduced by comedian Sarah Silverman.

== Discography ==
- Pink Elephant (2016)

=== Guest appearances ===
- "Effington - University A Cappella Version" (2009) by Ben Folds - Vocals
- "So There" (2015) by Ben Folds and yMusic - Harmonies
- "Balloons" (2018) by Unstabile - Vocals

== See also ==
- "Gracie" (2005 song by Ben Folds)
