= Corn Mo =

American musician

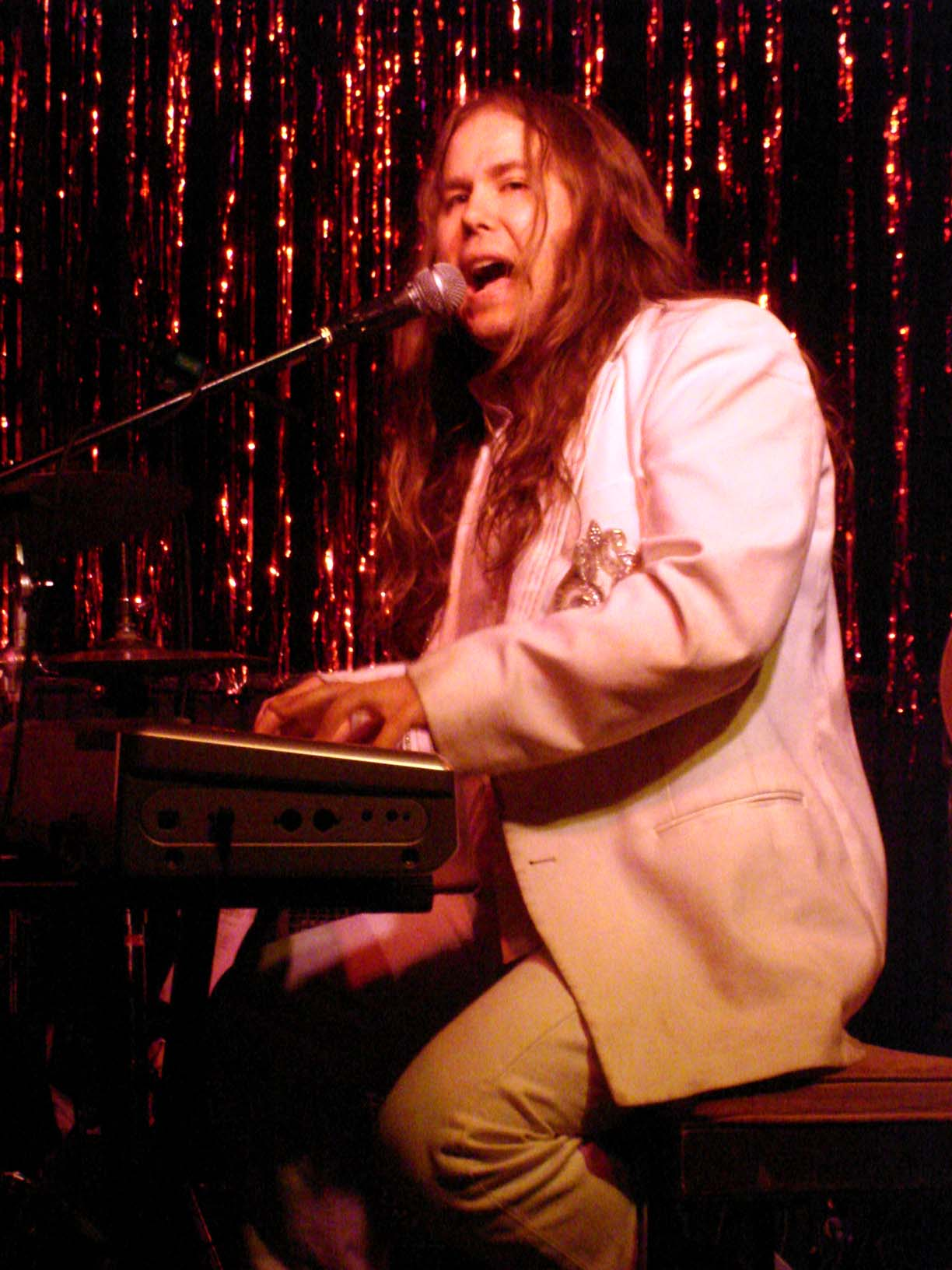
- Parkside Lounge, New York City, May 9, 2007

Background information
- Born: Jonathan Cunningham
- Origin: Denton, Texas
- Genres: Rock
- Website: cornmo.com

Corn Mo is the stage name of Jon Cunningham, an American, Brooklyn-based musician. Corn Mo sings, plays the accordion, and keyboards, and sometimes performs as a one-man band. His music style is a mixture of circus music, glam rock, and humorous novelty songs. He is currently recording his third solo album, and albums with his band .357 Lover. Many of his songs and stylings are heavily influenced by Meat Loaf (to whom he bears a slight physical resemblance) and Queen.

== Recording as Corn Mo ==
He started his music career in Denton, Texas. Corn Mo released his first full-length album, I Hope You Win!, in 2000. His 2002 follow-up The Magic Is You!, features his most popular song, "Busey Boy", about being mistaken for actor Gary Busey. He is featured on the Ben Folds album Supersunnyspeedgraphic singing backing vocals on "Get Your Hands Off My Woman." He recently appeared in the Trachtenburg Family Slideshow Players' DVD release of On and Off Broadway. He performed a duet with Jason Trachtenburg on his accordion to a new rendition of the Trachtenburgs' song "Beautiful Dandelion". Back in the Denton days Corn Mo teamed up with friend Mauve Oed for a cassette. It included a cover of Mötley Crüe's "Home Sweet Home" which garnered play on local indie radio show The Adventure Club.

In October 2012, it was announced that he had joined "Tragedy", the all metal tribute band to the Bee Gees.

== Albums with .357 Lover ==
.357 Lover, first formed when Corn Mo lived in Denton, backs Corn Mo when he is not playing as a solo performer. Their current lineup is Dave Wallin on bass, and Ron Salvo on drums. .357 Lover recorded their first EP, titled Your Favorite Hamburger is a Cheeseburger, in 2007. A full-length debut, Diorama of the Golden Lion, was released in September 2009.

== Live ==
For several years before moving to New York, Corn Mo performed at many small venues in north Texas (Denton and the Dallas/Fort Worth Metroplex), developing a small but loyal following. In 2003, Corn Mo played the Austin City Limits Music Festival. He plays accordion on Mary Prankster's live album Lemonade: Live which was recorded at the 9:30 Club in Washington, DC on May 10, 2003. On May 20, 2003 Corn Mo appeared on Jimmy Kimmel Live! where he performed "Busey Boy" with Kimmel's live band. In 2003 and 2004, he toured with The Polyphonic Spree as a member of their band. He has toured numerous times with They Might Be Giants and Ben Folds. Corn Mo is featured on the 2004 They Might Be Giants live album Almanac, playing the song "Particle Mo" (a live version of "Particle Man") with the band. In June 2006, he performed at the Bonnaroo Music Festival. In April 2007, .357 Lover performed as the backing group for Andrew W.K. in Denton, Texas. Corn Mo toured again with Folds on his November Surprise Tour 2006. On June 15, 2007, They Might Be Giants announced via a bulletin that Corn Mo would be the opening act for "many of the shows" on their "We Got a Fever for the Flavor of a Whatnot 2007 United States Tour."

In 2012, Corn Mo was the opening act for Nick Offerman's college tour, and played backup on a few songs during Offerman's show. He was also the opening act for Wheatus from 12 May - 10 June on their UK tour in 2012.

== Filmography ==
In 2014 Corn Mo, credited as Jonathan Cunningham, played a bartender in the Netflix series Orange Is the New Black in the episode entitled Low Esteem City.

In 2021, Corn Mo appeared in a series of internet and television commercials for NJM Insurance playing the Agency Musician.
