= Phone in a Pool =

Single by Ben Folds and yMusic

from the album So There
- Released: 2015
- Recorded: 2014
- Genre: Rock
- Length: 4:04
- Label: New West Records
- Songwriter: Ben Folds

Ben Folds singles chronology
| "From Above" (2010) | "Phone in a Pool" (2015) | "Mister Peepers" (2018) |

"Phone in a Pool" is the first single from Ben Folds' 2015 album So There. It reached number 28 on the Billboard Triple-A (adult album alternative) chart in 2015. He debuted the song at Bonnaroo in June 2015.

== Overview ==
The song is about how Folds was frustrated with his phone - and the expectations others had of their access to him - so much so that he threw it into the pool at the Sunset Marquis in West Hollywood. To his surprise, Kesha was there and tried to help him by fishing it out, but to no avail - the phone didn't survive the swim. Kesha developed bronchitis the next day.

"Phone in a Pool" was featured in Folds' appearance on NPR's Tiny Desk Concerts on February 16, 2016.

== Chart history ==
| Chart (2015) | Peak position |
|---|---|
| US Adult Alternative Airplay (Billboard) | 28 |
