= Winslow Gardens =

Single by Ben Folds

from the album What Matters Most
- Released: February 15, 2023
- Recorded: 2022
- Studio: Middletree (Nashville)
- Genre: Chamber pop
- Length: 3:26
- Label: New West Records
- Songwriter: Ben Folds
- Producer: Joe Pisapia

Ben Folds singles chronology
| "It's the Small Things, Charlie Brown" (2022) | "Winslow Gardens" (2023) | "Exhausting Lover" (2023) |

"Winslow Gardens" is the first single from Ben Folds 2023 album What Matters Most. It was released along with the announcement of the album, on February 15, 2023.

== Background ==
Winslow Gardens was recorded along with the rest of the album in the summer of 2022. It was released on February 15 of 2023, along with the announcement of the album.

== Critical reception ==
“Winslow Gardens” was widely highlighted by reviewers as one of the album's strongest tracks, pointing to its blend of narrative detail and melodic immediacy. Lee Zimmerman of American Songwriter described it as part of the album's “classic pop pastiche” moments, writing that “Kristine from the 7th Grade, the classic pop pastiche shared in ‘Winslow Gardens’” helps anchor the album’s more reflective turns.

Thomas Bedenbaugh of Slant Magazine singled out “Winslow Gardens” for its strong hook and its thematic engagement, noting that it “features What Matters Most’s catchiest hook and exudes an energy reminiscent of Folds’s heyday”. He added that the track “uses an apartment as its central image to ruminate on how it feels to navigate middle age,” giving the song a sharper thematic focus than many of the record's other character-studies.

Even critics who were more critical of the album as a whole singled out the track as a highlight. In his review for Slant, Bedenbaugh observed that “the majority of the album… broaches the topic of aging with songs that feel too overwrought and too overproduced,” and by contrast implicitly positioned “Winslow Gardens” as one of the few tracks that escapes that trap. Ian Rushbury of Under the Radar emphasized the more intimate side of the album's palette, arguing that the quieter, narrative-focused songs like “Winslow Gardens” — where Folds's piano and voice “carry the emotional weight” — are where the album works best.

== Personnel ==
=== Musicians ===
- Ben Folds – vocals, piano, keyboards, bass guitar, drums
- Tim Harrington – acoustic guitars, vocals
- Paul Wright – cello, vocals
- Ross Garren – keyboards, harmonica
- Paul Dumas – drums, vocals
- Joe Pisapia – electric guitars, pedal steel, vocals
- Rob Moose – string arrangements, violins, violas
- Gabe Cabezas – cello

=== Technical ===
- Joe Pisapia – production
- Pete Lyman – mastering
- Michael Brauer – mixing
- Joe Costa – engineering
- Josh Cournoyer – engineering assistance
