= Songs for Goldfish =

Compilation album by Ben Folds
- Released: May 3, 2005
- Recorded: 2002–2005
- Genre: Pop, rock
- Label: Epic
- Producer: Ben Folds

Ben Folds chronology
Songs for Silverman (2005)	Songs for Goldfish (2005)	iTunes Originals (2005)

Songs for Goldfish is a Ben Folds album of live and unreleased tracks packaged with Songs for Silverman and released through Ben Folds' website. Tracks 1 through 8 are live performances, 9 and 10 are unreleased studio tracks.

== Recording details ==
- Tracks 1–5 – Live at Dickinson College, Carlisle, Pennsylvania on January 28, 2005.
- Track 6 – Live at Roseland Ballroom in New York City on June 13, 2002.
- Tracks 7, 8 – Live at the El Rey Theater, Los Angeles, California on October 22, 2004.
- Track 9 – Released studio track, recorded at Eastside Music Technology, Adelaide, Australia.
- Track 10 – Released studio track, originally performed by Lucinda Williams.

Track 1 opens down with the second (scherzo) movement of Beethoven's Ninth Symphony as done by Wendy Carlos for the Clockwork Orange Soundtrack.

== Track listing ==
1. "In Between Days" (Live)
2. "Gone" (Live)
3. "Hiro's Song" (Live)
4. "You to Thank" (Live)
5. "Weather Channel Music" (Live)
6. "Evaporated" (Live)
7. "There's Always Someone Cooler Than You" (Live)
8. "Rockin' the Suburbs" (Live)
9. "Radio Jingles for Tokyo's Inter-FM"
10. "Side of the Road"
