= You Don't Know Me (Ben Folds song) =

Single by Ben Folds featuring Regina Spektor

from the album Way to Normal
- Released: 2008
- Genre: Indie pop
- Length: 3:12
- Label: Epic
- Songwriter: Ben Folds

Ben Folds singles chronology
"Jesusland" (2005)	"You Don't Know Me" (2008)	"From Above" (2010)

Music video
- "You Don't Know Me" on YouTube

"You Don't Know Me" is a song by American musician Ben Folds, the lead single from his third studio album Way to Normal (2008). The song features Regina Spektor on vocals dueting with Ben Folds. The song is also the 4th song on Ben Folds' 2009 album Stems & Seeds.

== Recording ==
Ben Folds called Regina Spektor and asked her to be featured in the song. In an interview with Rolling Stone, he explained, "I just called her up and we went up and did it. I had a part I wanted her to sing it, but she added a lot. There's stuff that just came out of her mouth that wasn't the plan, which is great. That's kinda what I wanted. The song chords were so simple there wasn't much room for that, but she's one of those talented people. When she works it's scary good. She's just all talent."

== Music video ==
The official music video for "You Don't Know Me" was directed by the comedy team of Tim Heidecker and Eric Wareheim, featuring Tim and Eric themselves as an unhappy couple. The footage is intermixed with video of Ben Folds, drummer Sam Smith and bassist Jared Reynolds playing on the lawn outside the couple's house. Regina Spektor herself is not in the video, although a photo of her (with the lips altered to look like they are singing) can be seen in the living room partway through the video. Josh Groban also appears in the video.

== In popular culture ==
The single was featured in the 11th episode of the fifth season of the ABC hit drama, Grey's Anatomy titled "Wish You Were Here". It was also featured in a January 2015 commercial for Nationwide Insurance.

== Track listing ==
1. "You Don't Know Me" – 3:12
2. "Hiroshima (B B B Benny Hit His Head)" – 3:37
3. "Brainwashed" (Non-album track) – 3:35

== Weekly chart ==
Chart (2008)	Peak position
US Adult Alternative Airplay (Billboard)	28
