= Merton (YouTuber) =

American singer

Merton is an American YouTube musician and personality who first gained press attention in March 2010 after making videos of himself interacting with people he met on Chatroulette and Omegle. In the videos, Merton sits at a piano and improvises songs about either his observations of the people he is meeting or story ideas suggested by them.

Merton's first video garnered more 5 star ratings than any other YouTube video in history, making it the highest rated YouTube video ever.

Merton's actual identity is unknown. He lives in Colorado.

Initially, there was speculation that "Merton" was in fact Ben Folds. While the two have similarities in appearance and music style, both have denied being the same person. Folds has in fact performed an homage to Merton at a concert where he similarly improvised songs while meeting people on Chatroulette. On a later video of Merton's, Ben Folds and Merton appeared together, proving that they are not the same person.

His musical style has been compared to Randy Newman and Ben Folds.

Merton was later hired by T-Mobile to do some public events in the United Kingdom; on November 24, 2010, he played in Gatwick Airport's South Terminal greeting international arriving passengers with his improv piano playing.

Merton previously hosted his own show on www.mertonshow.com. It was a live interactive webcam show where he continued his improvisation as he did on Chatroulette. Shows were every Wednesday at 10 PM Eastern time. Sometimes, there was an international show at 21:00 GMT (4 PM Eastern).
