= A Dream About Lightning Bugs =

2019 memoir by Ben Folds

A Dream About Lightning Bugs: A Life of Music and Cheap Lessons
- Author: Ben Folds
- Language: English
- Subject: Memoir
- Publisher: Ballantine Books
- Publication date: July 30, 2019
- Media type: Print (hardcover), Audiobook
- Pages: 336
- ISBN: 978-1-984-81727-3
- Website: www.benfolds.com/book

A Dream About Lightning Bugs: A Life of Music and Cheap Lessons is a memoir written by musician Ben Folds, first published in July 2019. It reflects on his early life, time as a member of Ben Folds Five, and his solo career to the near present.

== Reception ==
The book received generally positive reviews and became a New York Times Best Seller.

Allison Stewart of The Washington Post commented, "Once an artist plays their first sold-out show, or signs their first record deal, they are no longer relatable human beings whose experiences in earlier chapters — childhood crushes, bullies, trouble at school — mirror our own. [...] It’s an unbridgeable gap, one that Ben Folds, a singer, pianist and musical Everyman whose relatability seems to have been factory-issued, does his best to navigate in his engaging and solid new memoir."

John Young of the Pittsburgh Post-Gazette stated that the book, "offers a glimpse inside the head of another musical genius while also being one of the best-written, most interesting musical memoirs of the rock era."
