= Religulous =

- Theatrical release poster
- Directed by: Larry Charles
- Written by: Bill Maher
- Produced by: Bill Maher; Jonah Smith; Palmer West
- Starring: Bill Maher
- Cinematography: Anthony Hardwick
- Edited by: Jeff Groth; Christian Kinnard; Jeffrey M. Werner
- Production company: Thousand Words
- Distributed by: Lionsgate
- Release dates: August 1, 2008 (Traverse City Film Festival); October 1, 2008 (United States)
- Running time: 96 minutes
- Country: United States
- Language: English
- Budget: $2.5 million
- Box office: $13.9 million

Religulous (/rɪˈlɪɡjʊləs, rɪˈlɪdʒʊləs/) is a 2008 American documentary film written by and starring comedian Bill Maher and directed by Larry Charles. The title of the film is a portmanteau derived from the words religious and ridiculous. The documentary examines and challenges religion and religious belief.

== Synopsis ==
A range of views on various world religions is explored as Bill Maher travels to numerous religious destinations including Jerusalem, the Vatican City, and Salt Lake City, interviewing believers from a variety of backgrounds and groups. These include a former member of Jews for Jesus, Christians, Muslims, ex-Mormons, and Hasidic Jews. Maher travels to Speakers' Corner in Hyde Park, London, where he "preaches" Scientology beliefs.

Maher also takes a tour around the Creation Museum and the Holy Land Experience. The film promotes the Christ myth theory, a fringe theory that Jesus was not a real historical person.

== Cast ==
All persons appearing as themselves:

- Bill Maher
- Francis Collins
- Jeremiah Cummings
- Pastor John Westcott
- Dean Hamer
- Ray Suarez
- Mark Pryor
- Father George Coyne
- Father Reginald Foster
- Andrew B. Newberg
- Dovid Weiss
- José Luis de Jesús Miranda
- Ken Ham
- Fatima Elatik
- Propa-Gandhi
- Geert Wilders
- Yehuda Etzion

== Production ==
Maher said he used a fake title A Spiritual Journey for the film to obtain interviews. Creationist Ken Ham of the group Answers in Genesis, who appeared in the film, was critical of what he called Maher's "deception" to obtain the interview.

The documentary was produced by Thousand Words and distributed by Lions Gate Entertainment. Originally slated for an international release date coinciding with the Christian Easter holiday 2008 (March 23), post-production delays resulting from a screenwriters guild strike pushed the release date back. The film was eventually released on October 3, 2008.

== Reception ==
=== Box office ===
Religulous had an opening weekend take of $3.5 million from an early October 1 release in Los Angeles and New York City and also a limited 502-theater release, averaging $6,972 per theater. As a result, the film was ranked at #10 at the box office that weekend. Its per-screen receipts were almost three times those of a competing film to which it has been compared in the media, the politically conservative An American Carol, which edged out Religulous to finish at #9 over the same weekend, but had a per theater average of only $2,325. Only the #1 movie, Beverly Hills Chihuahua, at $9,020, had a higher per-screen average than Religulous.

For the second weekend, Religulous had a 35.5% drop in box office receipts and dropped to #13 with a gross of $2,200,000 at 568 theaters for a per screen average of $3,873.

Religulous grossed over $13 million after having a production budget of $2.5 million. As of 2019, it is 27th among the highest grossing documentaries in the US and was the highest grossing documentary of 2008.

=== Critical response ===
Religulous received mixed to positive reviews. On Rotten Tomatoes the film has an approval rating of 69%, based on 154 reviews, with an average rating of 6.31/10. The site's critical consensus reads, "Religulous is funny and offensive in equal measure, and aims less to change hearts and minds than to inspire conversation." On Metacritic the film has a score of 56 out of 100, based on 31 critics, "mixed or average reviews".

Film critic Roger Ebert gave the film a rating of three and a half out of four stars, and wrote: "I report faithfully that I laughed frequently. You may very well hate it, but at least you've been informed. Perhaps you could enjoy the material about other religions, and tune out when yours is being discussed. That's only human nature."

Robert W. Butler of The Kansas City Star gave the film a rating of three stars, and commented: "The film is one-sided, less a measured argument than a bunch of rants and barbed observations. But it’s also very funny, which trumps everything else." Owen Gleiberman of Entertainment Weekly gave the film a rating of A−, and wrote: "The movie is funny as...well, hell." The Canadian Press said the movie "delivers a laugh-out-loud attack on the most sacred of cows."

Christie Lemire, of the Associated Press, wrote: "If you're an atheist or an agnostic, you'll be completely on board and happy to tag along with Maher as he travels the globe asking people about their faith — everywhere from Jerusalem to the Vatican to Amsterdam, where he finds not only the Cannabis Ministry but also a Muslim gay bar (with two people in it)." John Anderson of Newsday wrote: "much that's funny, insightful and thought-provoking. But it certainly doesn't give the religious a lot of slack."

The documentary received some negative reviews, with Rick McGinnis of Metro concluding that, "Maher is preaching to the choir with an undisguised dishonesty that only the true believers will forgive." James Berardinelli wrote, "If the subject of religion is as important to Maher as he claims during his end comments, then he should have followed those words with actions and made a movie that's more than a sum of inauthentic interviews, ranting attacks, and obvious observations. The choir may hum along with Maher but the rest of those watching this movie will be singing the blues." Nick Schager of Slant Magazine called it an "atheistic wannabe-dissection of modern faith."

Sam Greenspan argues that "Jewish people seemed to get handled with kid gloves" by Maher, noting that Judaism did not receive as much focus in the film as Christianity and Islam. Greenspan, who is Jewish himself, wrote "if you’re trying to predict what Holy War is going to bring about the destruction of this planet, tragically, Israel’s going to be an epicenter and the Jews are probably going to factor in."

In a review for The New York Times, Stephen Holden notes that when Maher "turns from evangelical Christianity to Judaism and Islam, its tone becomes uncertain and its rhythm choppy". Holden also wrote that "the film has the same loose, on-the-road structure" as Larry Charles' previous film Borat: Cultural Learnings of America for Make Benefit Glorious Nation of Kazakhstan and commented: "Much of Mr. Maher’s film is extremely funny in a similarly irreverent, offhanded way." Claudia Puig of USA Today wrote: "those with a taste for irreverent humor and clear-eyed analysis will find it funny, enlightening and disturbing." Kirk Honeycutt of The Hollywood Reporter characterized the film as "An often hilarious but relentlessly shallow attack on religious fundamentalism".

Louis Peitzman of the San Francisco Bay Guardian wrote that "It doesn't even matter that he goes out of his way to be offensive, as he's consistently funny enough to pull it off." Scott Indrisek wrote at Style.com that: "Religulous earns many of its laughs from skillful editing, with Maher's interviews jazzed up by video clips".

Ben Kenigsberg of Time Out New York gave the film a rating of three out of six stars, and wrote: "The worst scenes in Religulous are appalling for their methods; the best are appalling for their information."

Harry Forbes of Catholic News Service condemned the film, deeming it "morally offensive."

=== Awards ===
Award	Category	Result
2008 Golden Trailer Award	Best Documentary Poster	Won (Note: For the poster "Toast".)
2008 Sitges Film Festival	Non Fiction Motion Picture	Won
2008 Satellite Award	Best Motion Picture, Documentary	Nominated

== DVD release ==
Lions Gate Entertainment released the film on DVD February 17, 2009. Special features on the DVD include a commentary with Bill Maher and director Larry Charles, deleted scenes, and extended Bill Maher monologues from around the world that were either edited down or not included in the film at all.

== Possible sequel ==
On January 4, 2015, Maher tweeted a photo of himself and director Larry Charles with the caption: "Director Larry Charles on the Hawaii trip this year...was "Religulous II" discussed??", suggesting the possibility of a sequel.

== Soundtrack ==
No.	Title	Writer(s)	Artist(s)	Length
1.	"Travelin' Band"	John Fogerty	Creedence Clearwater Revival	2:08
2.	"The Birds and the Bees"	Herbert Newman	Jewel Akens	2:09
3.	"I Ain't Superstitious"	Willie Dixon	Jeff Beck Group	4:54
4.	"Wooly Bully"	Domingo "Sam" Samudio	Sam the Sham & the Pharaohs	2:21
5.	"Alma Redemptoris Mater"	Traditional	Voices of Ascension	2:55
6.	"Jesusland"	Ben Folds	Ben Folds	4:28
7.	"Crazy"	Brian Burton, Thomas Callaway, Gian Franco Reverberi, Gian Piero Reverberi	Gnarls Barkley	4:34
8.	"Jesus Is Just Alright"	Arthur Reid Reynolds	The Doobie Brothers	3:00
9.	"Party in My Pants"	Doron Braunshtein	Doron Burstein	4:27
10.	"Yiddish Blues"	Traditional	Klezmer Conservatory Band	3:10
11.	"Highway 61 Revisited"	Bob Dylan	Bob Dylan	3:41
12.	"I Think We're Alone Now"	Ritchie Cordell	Tiffany	3:49
13.	"Road to Nowhere"	David Byrne, Chris Frantz, Jerry Harrison, Tina Weymouth	Talking Heads	4:20

== See also ==
- Jesus Camp
- Marjoe
- Religious satire
- Kumaré
