= The Bens =

Rock supergroup of three musicians named Ben

- The Bens' logo

Background information
- Also known as: The Three Bens
- Origin: Australia
- Genres: Rock, indie pop
- Years active: 2003
- Labels: EMI, BMG
- Past members: Ben Folds; Ben Kweller; Ben Lee

Ben Folds	Ben Kweller	Ben Lee

The Bens were a rock supergroup consisting of the trio Ben Folds, Ben Kweller, and Ben Lee, which toured for "the Bens Rock Over Australia tour" in 2003.

== History ==
Kweller described how the trio formed saying, "Well actually our fans noticed that we all had the same first name and had said for a long time wouldn't it be great if we all played together. So we thought, maybe we should do that. It would be fun and we were all friends going into it. It was just a cool spontaneous thing, you know." From 14 to 28 March 2003 they played nine concerts: Brisbane, Gold Coast, Newcastle, Sydney (twice), Canberra, Melbourne, Adelaide and Perth. A proposed tenth show at a Melbourne shopping centre was cancelled.

Lee, Folds, and Kweller each played individual sets at the concerts, however, at the beginning and end of each set, all three played several songs as a trio. Two performances were recorded live for the Live at the Wireless (the Melbourne concert) and Live at the Basement (one of the Sydney concerts) radio series. The group recorded a four-track self-titled extended play, which was initially only sold at venues, but was later released in Australia and overseas. It had been recorded in Nashville.

Several live tracks from the two radio recordings were included on the Japanese release. One track from the original EP, "Just Pretend", was listed on the Triple J Hottest 100, 2003. In 2003 they contributed a cover version of "Wicked Little Town" to Wig in a Box, a tribute album for the musical, Hedwig and the Angry Inch.

Though various combinations of the three members have toured together at various times, the trio have not reformed as a group, and have not recorded any more material. In a brief interview after a show in Raleigh, North Carolina, on 31 July 2010, Ben Kweller confirmed that the Bens would perform as a group on an upcoming European Tour.

== Reception ==
Jasper "Jaz" Lee of Oz Music Project opined that the EP's "songs have an inkling of different styles, each with a particular leaning... [they] are three great artists, each of different levels of maturity in their fields, and differing in the genre of their pursuits. Yet, apart from their mutual first names there seems to be a good connection between them that was witnessed both on stage and on this EP." AllMusic's MacKenzie Wilson felt "This little four-track gem is strictly for die-hard followers. Those who enjoy Kweller and Lee as artists should also enjoy the quirky pop selection. Folds is somewhat of a father figure to the younger Bens, and together their harmonies are matchless. Each comprises a dash of humor and innocence."

== Discography ==
- The Bens (EP, 2003)
- Wig in a Box (Compilation, 2003) - "Wicked Little Town"
