= What Matters Most (Ben Folds album) =

Studio album by Ben Folds
- Released: June 2, 2023
- Recorded: 2022
- Studio: Middletree (Nashville)
- Genre: Chamber pop
- Length: 38:36
- Labels: New West; Redeye Distribution
- Producer: Joe Pisapia

Ben Folds chronology
So There (2015)	What Matters Most (2023)	Sleigher (2024)

Singles from What Matters Most
- 1. "Winslow Gardens" Released: February 15, 2023; 2. "Exhausting Lover" Released: April 12, 2023; 3. "Back to Anonymous" Released: May 19, 2023

Professional ratings
Aggregate scores
Source	Rating
Metacritic	70/100
Review scores
Source	Rating
AllMusic	3.5/5 stars
American Songwriter	3.5/5 stars
Glide Magazine	70/100
Mojo	4/5 stars
MusicOMH	3.5/5 stars
PopMatters	6/10
Slant Magazine	2.5/5 stars
Sputnikmusic	2/5
Under the Radar	8/10 stars

What Matters Most is the fifth studio album by American singer-songwriter Ben Folds. Released on June 2, 2023, by New West Records, it was preceded by So There in 2015.

The album was announced on February 15, 2023, along with the release of the first single from the album, "Winslow Gardens". Folds toured the U.S. and Europe starting on March 24, 2023, in Eau Claire, Wisconsin, and ending on December 4, 2023, in Essen, Germany.

In an interview Folds called his album his most "true" to date, saying "I come from the vinyl era, and this perhaps more than any record I've made is a true album. There's a very specific sequence and arc to each side, all building up to this almost surreal positive finale, and that structure was really important to me." In the same interview, he says "Sonically, lyrically, emotionally, I don't think it's an album I could have made at any other point in my career."

Two more singles were released with "Exhausting Lover" being released on April 12, 2023, and "Back to Anonymous" being released on May 19, 2023.

== Track listing ==
All tracks are written by Ben Folds, except where noted.

What Matters Most – Standard edition
No.	Title	Writer(s)	Length
1.	"But Wait, There's More"		3:42
2.	"Clouds with Ellipses" (featuring dodie)		3:01
3.	"Exhausting Lover"		3:36
4.	"Fragile"		3:36
5.	"Kristine from the 7th Grade"		5:23
6.	"Back to Anonymous"		4:21
7.	"Winslow Gardens"		3:26
8.	"Paddleboat Breakup"		4:49
9.	"What Matters Most"		4:11
10.	"Moments" (featuring Tall Heights)	Folds; Paul Wright; Tim Harrington	3:53
Total length:			39:58

What Matters Most – Deluxe CD bonus tracks
No.	Title	Writer(s)	Length
11.	"Happy Clapper"		4:03
12.	"Why Did You Tell Me Everything"	Folds; D. Cullen	3:45
13.	"A Million Years or So"	Roger Miller	2:27

What Matters Most – Limited edition vinyl (Flexi disc bonus track)
No.	Title	Writer(s)	Length
1.	"The Ghost in You"	Richard Butler; Tim Butler	4:02
Total length:			4:02

== Personnel ==
=== Musicians ===
- Ben Folds – vocals, piano, keyboards, bass guitar, drums
- Tim Harrington – acoustic guitars, vocals
- Paul Wright – cello, vocals
- Ross Garren – keyboards, harmonica
- Paul Dumas – drums, vocals
- Joe Pisapia – electric guitars, pedal steel, vocals
- Josh Cournoyer – background vocals
- Jim Hoke – horns (tracks 1, 3, 9)
- Emmanuel Echem – horns (1, 3, 9)
- John Hinchey – horns (1, 3, 9)
- dodie – vocals (2)
- Rob Moose – string arrangements, violins, violas (4, 7)
- Love Sponge Strings (Note: Love Sponge Strings consists of Carole Rabinowitz, Kristin Wilkinson, David Davidson, and David Angel.) – strings (5)
- Ruby Amanfu – vocals (6)
- Gabe Cabezas – cello (7)

=== Technical ===
- Joe Pisapia – production
- Pete Lyman – mastering
- Michael Brauer – mixing
- Joe Costa – engineering
- Josh Cournoyer – engineering assistance

=== Artwork ===
- Sensetus – cover art
- Matt Toll – photography
- Sam Smith – package design

== Charts ==
Chart performance for What Matters Most
Chart (2023)	Peak position
Scottish Albums (Official Charts)	24
UK Album Downloads (Official Charts)	12
UK Americana Albums (Official Charts)	7
UK Independent Albums (Official Charts)	12
US Top Album Sales (Billboard)	13
