= Speed Graphic (EP) =

EP by Ben Folds
- Released: July 22, 2003
- Length: 20:56
- Label: Attacked by Plastic

Ben Folds chronology
Ben Folds Live (2002)	Speed Graphic (2003)	Sunny 16 (2003)

Professional ratings
Review scores
Source	Rating
AllMusic	3.5/5 stars
Pitchfork Media	5.5/10
The Rolling Stone Album Guide	2/5 stars

Speed Graphic is the first of a three-EP series released by Ben Folds in 2003. It included a cover of "In Between Days" (originally by The Cure, from their 1985 album The Head on the Door). It also included a piano and vocal arrangement of "Give Judy My Notice", which would later appear on Songs for Silverman in a rearranged full-band version. The final three tracks were written a long time before this release. Two of those songs, "Protection" (co-written by Ben's former wife, Anna Goodman) and "Dog" have floated around as bootlegged early demos for years, and the other one, "Wandering", was never available in any format previously, and was written by Ben Folds and his fellow Ben Folds Five bandmate, Darren Jessee.

The ending of the track "Dog" contains an impromptu call that Ben receives from his then wife Frally Hynes on his cell phone while recording the vocal track.

== Track listing ==
No.	Title	Lyrics	Length
1.	"In Between Days"	Robert Smith	2:53
2.	"Give Judy My Notice"	Ben Folds	3:59
3.	"Protection"	Folds; Anna Goodman	4:36
4.	"Dog"	Folds; Evan Olson	4:29
5.	"Wandering"	Folds; Darren Jessee	4:59

"In Between Days" was used in the Apple iPad introduction video.
