= Landed (Ben Folds song) =

Single by Ben Folds

from the album Songs for Silverman
- Released: 2005
- Studio: El Rey Theatre
- Genre: Rock
- Length: 4:28
- Label: Epic
- Songwriter(s): Ben Folds

Ben Folds singles chronology
"Bitches Ain't Shit" (2005)	"Landed" (2005)	"Jesusland" (2005)

Music video
- "Landed" on YouTube

"Landed" was the first single from Ben Folds' 2005 album Songs for Silverman. It reached number 77 on the Billboard Hot 100 chart and number 40 on the Billboard Adult Top 40 chart, making it one of Folds' biggest hits.

Per Folds, "'Landed' is about a friend of mine who was in a bad relationship. I just wrote a song about it." String arranger Paul Buckmaster had done arrangement, but Folds left it out on the initial release. Said Folds, "he'd weighed in strong, almost intrusively I thought. [...] I regretted it before it hit the stores and made sure all subsequent versions of the song were released with strings."

== Chart history ==
Chart (2005)	Peak position
US Billboard Hot 100	77
US Adult Pop Airplay (Billboard)	40

== Other notable performances ==
- "Landed - University A Cappella Version" was first performed by The University of Colorado Buffoons in 2009 for Ben Folds' University A Capella Album.
- "Landed" was covered by The Yale Spizzwinks on their 2009 album Cause for Alarm.
- Folds played "Landed" with Daryl Hall on his show Live from Daryl's House on June 12, 2015 (Episode 70).
- Folds guest-starred on a second season episode of the Showtime drama series Billions in April 2017, playing the song.
