= Songs for Silverman =

Studio album by Ben Folds
- Released: April 25, 2005
- Recorded: 2004
- Genre: Alternative rock
- Length: 44:08
- Label: Sony (UK); Epic (US)
- Producer: Ben Folds, John Mark Painter

Ben Folds chronology
Super D (2004)	Songs for Silverman (2005)	Songs for Goldfish (2005)

Singles from Songs for Silverman
- 1. "Landed" Released: 2005

Professional ratings
Aggregate scores
Source	Rating
Metacritic	69/100
Review scores
Source	Rating
AllMusic	4/5 stars
Alternative Press	3/5 stars
Drowned in Sound	8/10
Entertainment Weekly	B+
Pitchfork	5.8/10
Playlouder	4/5 stars
PopMatters	4/10
Rolling Stone	3.5/5 stars
Stylus Magazine	C+
Uncut	3/5 stars

Songs for Silverman is the second studio album by Ben Folds, released in April 2005 by Epic Records. The album reached No. 13 on the Billboard 200, making it Folds' highest-charting album until the release of Way to Normal in 2008.

The album is named after Ben Goldman, Folds' former A&R representative at Sony BMG. Folds explained, "I was always sending songs to him for the album, so I wanted to name it after him. But somebody (from Sony) found out and flipped out, so I changed it a bit and turned it in." Goldman's name also spawned the title of Folds' compilation album Songs for Goldfish.

== Singles ==
The first single, "Landed", reached No. 77 on the Billboard Hot 100 and No. 40 on the Adult Top 40. A planned United Kingdom issue was cancelled, though the single received a digital-only release.

The single "Jesusland" reached No. 2 on the UK airplay chart in October 2005. It has also been playlisted by Xfm London and BBC Radio 2 (which lists it as "download only"). The track was slated for a UK single release in September 2005, but it never made it to store shelves. The video for the single features Matt Lucas as a televangelist interspersed with scenes of a journey through what may well be "Jesusland" itself. The track was featured in the 2008 documentary Religulous.

The album's next UK single, "Late", was written as a tribute to the recently deceased singer-songwriter Elliott Smith.

== Other songs ==
The song "Gracie" is written about Folds' daughter. He had previously written one about his son Louis on Rockin' the Suburbs, called "Still Fighting It," and he often performs the two songs together during live shows.

"Weird Al" Yankovic, who directed Folds' video for "Rockin' the Suburbs," contributes backing vocals to "Time".

== Track listing ==
All songs written by Ben Folds, except where noted.

No.	Title	Length
1.	"Bastard"	5:23
2.	"You to Thank"	3:36
3.	"Jesusland"	4:30
4.	"Landed"	4:28
5.	"Gracie"	2:40
6.	"Trusted"	4:08
7.	"Give Judy My Notice"	3:37
8.	"Late"	3:58
9.	"Sentimental Guy"	3:03
10.	"Time"	4:30
11.	"Prison Food"	4:15

LP-only bonus track

12. "Bitches Ain't Shit" (Delmar Arnaud, Calvin Broadus, Jr., Ricardo Brown, Tracy Curry, Colin Wolfe, Andre Young) – 3:54

Japan-only bonus track

12. "Side of the Road" – 2:58

DVD-only bonus track

12. "Landed" (Strings Version) – 4:46

=== DVD listing ===
- The Making of Songs for Silverman
- Live performances
- Interviews
- Behind-the-scenes footage

The DualDisc additionally contains the entire album in Dolby Digital 5.1 surround sound.

== Personnel ==
The Band

- Ben Folds – piano, vocals
- Jared Reynolds – bass, vocals
- Lindsay Jamieson – drums, vocals

Additional musicians

- Bucky Baxter – pedal steel (7, 11), 12-string guitar (7)
- Frally Folds – backing vocals (7)
- David Henry – cello (3, 5)
- Ned Henry – violin (3)
- John Mark Painter – double bass (5, 9), French horn (9)
- Al Yankovic – backing vocals (10)

== Charts ==
Chart performance for Songs for Silverman
Chart (2005)	Peak position
Australian Albums (ARIA)	9
German Albums (Offizielle Top 100)	84
Irish Albums (IRMA)	68
UK Albums (OCC)	65
US Billboard 200	13
