= Sunny 16 (EP) =

EP by Ben Folds
- Released: September 30, 2003
- Length: 20:54
- Label: Attacked By Plastic

Ben Folds chronology
| Speed Graphic (2003) | Sunny 16 (2003) | Super D (2004) |

Professional ratings
Review scores
| Source | Rating |
|---|---|
| Allmusic | 3.5/5 stars |
| The Guardian | (average) |
| Pitchfork Media | 5.2/10 |
| The Rolling Stone Album Guide | 3/5 stars |

Sunny 16 is the second of a three-EP series by Ben Folds. The EP includes one cover track, "Songs of Love" (written and performed originally by Neil Hannon's The Divine Comedy on the 1996 album Casanova). The song "Rock Star" was co-written by his wife at that time, Frally Hynes-Folds.

== Hidden tracks ==
The last two tracks both contain hidden tracks of sorts, although they are really just a snippet of one of the track layers of the song on which the tracks are hidden. In "Rock Star", it is the song's closing vocal overlays, and in "Songs of Love" is the string quartet's part.

== Comments from Ben Folds ==
Regarding the contents of the EP, Folds said the following: "If I was starting over again and had to make a demo tape, I'd use this EP. It represents a big part of what I do very naturally. Part of me thinks I'm an idiot for 'wasting' this recording on a limited release EP, but I'm really into this method of recording and releasing quickly and making it all about music, so here it is."^{[1]}

== Track listing ==
All lyrics are written by Ben Folds, except where noted.

| No. | Title | Lyrics | Length |
|---|---|---|---|
| 1. | "There's Always Someone Cooler Than You" | | 4:15 |
| 2. | "Learn to Live with What You Are" | | 4:25 |
| 3. | "All U Can Eat" | | 3:22 |
| 4. | "Rock Star" | Folds; Frally Hynes | 4:23 |
| 5. | "Songs of Love" | Neil Hannon | 4:30 |

== General references ==
- Suddath, Clair, "Ben Folds Is Not Cooler Than You," pg 41, Nashville Scene, November 2, 2006.
