= Bitches Ain't Shit =

1992 song by Dr. Dre

Song by Dr. Dre featuring Snoop Doggy Dogg, Dat Nigga Daz, Kurupt, and Jewell

from the album The Chronic
- Released: December 15, 1992
- Genre: West Coast rap; gangsta rap; G-funk
- Length: 4:48
- Label: Death Row; Interscope
- Songwriters: Delmar Arnaud; Andre Young; Ricardo Brown; Calvin Broadus Jr.; Tracy Curry; Colin Wolfe
- Producer: Dr. Dre

Audio sample
- file; help

"Bitches Ain't Shit" is the final song of Dr. Dre's 1992 album The Chronic. Though never a single, it was an underground hit that contributed significantly to the album's sales. In addition to Dre's verse, "Bitches Ain't Shit" also features Dat Nigga Daz, Kurupt and singer Jewell. It proved controversial due to its prevalent themes of misogyny.

== Production ==
"Bitches Ain't Shit" was originally a hidden track, but was added to the cover art from the 2001 reissue onwards. It was a last-minute replacement for "Deep Cover", which the label felt was too risky to release on The Chronic in the wake of the "Cop Killer" controversy.

The song is written in the G-funk style which Dre pioneered, including a bass riff interpolated from Funkadelic's "Adolescent Funk" and a whistle synthesiser riff in the "Funky Worm" style, plus samples from MC Shan's "The Bridge" and Trouble Funk's "Let's Get Small".

Bassist Colin Wolfe later recalled: "One day, I was alone in the control room and Dre and Daz were up in the back room, trying to mess around on the keyboard for the 'Bitches Ain't Shit' bass line. So I stepped in the doorway and I could hear what they were trying to do. I said, 'Man, look out, y'all trying to do this.' I straight did it, recorded it, and then I was like, 'Yo, I got another part,' and did the high Moog part right after that."

== Lyrics ==
The song opens with the lines:

Bitches ain't shit but hoes and tricks
Lick on these nuts and suck the dick
Gets the fuck out after you're done
And I hops in my ride to make a quick run.

These lyrics have become well known in pop culture and hip-hop history as an example of misogyny.

Dre's verse was ghostwritten by the D.O.C., a rapper whom Dre discovered in Dallas and who helped him form Death Row Records. It never directly comments on women, but is actually instead intended as a diss towards Eazy-E who is referred to as a "bitch" and by his legal name Eric Wright. The "white bitch" refers to manager Jerry Heller.

Daz's verse continues the anti-Eazy sentiment, while Kurupt's focuses more on his resentment of women and sex workers. Snoop's verse tells the story of being released from prison and learning that his girlfriend Mandy May has been unfaithful, then going to her house to seek revenge only to learn that his cousin Daz is the culprit.

Eazy would later retort to the song with "Real Muthaphuckkin G's", which became his biggest solo hit.

== Critical reception ==
The song, and The Chronic in general, was released in the context of a moral panic about rap music in which the Parents Music Resource Center's "Parental Advisory" labels became prominent, a court case which deemed 2 Live Crew's As Nasty as They Wanna Be album obscene, the Rodney King riots, a backlash against gangster rap from Harlem preacher Reverend Calvin Butts and a number of high-profile legal proceedings against rappers, including Tupac Shakur and Dre himself for his assault of Dee Barnes. In Harlem, T-shirts reading "Bitches ain't shit but hoes and tricks" were sold on the street as a response to Butts' attacks.

Criticism of the genre began to target from not just the violent but also the misogynistic content. Kyra Gaunt's The Games Black Girls Play quotes a Black woman named Malike's opinion on the song from 1993: "I don't admit to liking it because it is downing women in everything that the song says. I shouldn't like it, but I love the song 'cause it's the jam." Gaunt then comments that "(Black) women appear to be dissociating themselves from the misogynistic lyrics, but their stance leaves them looking like they are afraid to criticize Black men in public. It also leaves them looking like their participation is all about the body, not the lyrics."

When Snoop was later questioned about his use of the word "bitch" by Kevin Powell, he responded: "It's just a word, you know, that you grew up with. It's some shit that's hard to shake." Ice-T later compared it to the words "nigga" and "ho", arguing that the context was important and adding that he had often heard women say "All men are dogs".

In September 1993, C. Delores Tucker, chair and 1984 founder of the National Political Congress of Black Women, a lobbying group in Washington, DC, was critical of "Bitches Ain't Shit" and demanded Congressional hearings into the genre of gangster rap.

In October 1993, rap journalist Dream Hampton called the song "the best on the best album of a pretty slow year."

In 1999, rap magazine Ego Trip named "16 Memorable Misogynist Rap Music Moments" and put "Bitches Ain't Shit" at #2.

In the 2006 film Hip-Hop: Beyond Beats and Rhymes, Jadakiss said about the song: "This shit is entertainment. If it was so bad like that, Snoop wouldn't have no fans or nothing like that. Snoop has been talking that 'Bitches Ain't Shit' shit since the beginning of time. (Women) want to hear that. They the main ones out there."

In 2008, The Source chief editor Kim Osario recalled: "Once Snoop said, 'Bitches ain't shit,' it was a wrap for us."

In a 2012 article commemorating the album's 20th anniversary, Billboard commented that misogyny is the album's elephant in the room and that "women are treated like disposable sperm receptacles".

== Answer songs and remixes ==
In 1999, Trina recorded an answer song called "Ain't Shit" from her album Da Baddest Bitch with the line: "Niggas ain't shit but hoes and tricks/Lick the pearl tongue, nigga, keep your dick/Get the fuck out after I cum, so I can hop in my coupé and make a quick run". In 2000, Lil' Kim also answered with "Suck My Dick": "Niggas ain't shit, but they still can trick/All they can do for me is suck my clit/I'm jumping the fuck up after I cum/Thinking they gon' get some pussy, but they gets none".

In 2001, Dipset's mixtape Diplomats Volume 1 offered a synthesis, "Bitches Ain't Shit (Remix)". In 2010, Boosie's mixtape Gone Til' December included "Niggas Ain't Shit". In 2011, YG's mixtape Just Re Up'd featured a new version of "Bitches Ain't Shit" with Tyga and Nipsey Hussle that samples the original and reached #90 on the Billboard Hot 100. Outside of these notable versions, "Bitches Ain't Shit" has been sampled many times over the years and has become a pop culture staple.

== Ben Folds version ==
"Bitches Ain't Shit"

Single by Ben Folds

from the album Supersunnyspeedgraphic, the LP
- A-side: "Landed"
- Released: March 8, 2005
- Genre: Alternative rock; Comedy rock
- Length: 4:10; 3:54 (EP version); 1:26 (reprise) (Bonus track attached to "Still" on SSSG)
- Label: Epic
- Songwriters: Andre Young; Delmar Arnaud; Calvin Broadus; Ricardo Brown; Tracy Lynn Curry; Colin Wolfe; Ben Folds

Ben Folds singles chronology
"Bizarre Christmas Incident" (2002)	"Bitches Ain't Shit" (2005)	"Landed" (2005)

Audio sample
- file; help

Chart	Peak position
US Billboard Hot 100	71
US Digital Song Sales (Billboard)	18

The Ben Folds version of "Bitches Ain't Shit" was first released as the B-side to his 2005 single "Landed". It was also later included on Supersunnyspeedgraphic and as a bonus track on the vinyl edition of Songs for Silverman. Peaking at 71 on the Billboard Hot 100 chart, it became one of his highest-charting singles.

Folds' version is a new composition featuring melancholy piano chords in a minor key, and in which only Dre and Snoop's verses feature. He originally wanted to cover Public Enemy's 1990 song "Can't Do Nuttin' for Ya, Man" but found it "too symmetrical for a good melody". He then settled on "Bitches Ain't Shit", feeling it had similarities with a country song by Johnny Cash or a scene from a film by Quentin Tarantino.

Folds' version drew criticism both for amplifying the misogyny of the original and for his intact use of the word "nigga", as he is a white man. While opening for John Mayer in 2007, Folds' performance of "Bitches Ain't Shit" was often booed by the audience. He would spitefully respond by playing it again or even a third time. Folds later noted that the mostly white audiences were in his view offended only by "the dick-sucking stuff ... Those white people were not concerned with the N-word at all. But me saying profanity, that's simply something they don't approve of. It’s not something that makes them feel bad."

In 2012, L.V. Anderson wrote in Slate that Folds' cover "was part of an ugly mini-trend (of ironic hip-hop covers) in alternative pop ... this bit of quasi-minstrelsy ostensibly pokes fun at Folds' whiteness, but comes across as sneeringly chauvinistic".

By 2019, Folds had decided to stop performing the song. He explained:

I don't play it anymore because things are so explosive in the United States. It's not that I fear inciting an explosion of sorts, it's that I feel bad for anyone who isn't white, who would have to experience that. It wasn't like that when it came out. When it came out, I remember bouncers – big black dudes with bald heads standing right in front of me while I'm playing – they'd hear the lyrics to Dr. Dre and they’re like, yeah! They thought that was great. Not so much now...

The song just had to be stopped. I had to stop playing it because – and I've had a lot of African-Americans tell me this – they don't like to go out to big events with lots of white people. That made me think about a time when I looked down [into the audience] and we're playing "Bitches Ain't Shit", and I saw a black couple pretty near me, and I'm like, how would I feel with the whole audience singing the N-word? Yes, 10 years ago it wasn't a big deal, but now it is a big deal, because they're being especially targeted. The N-word in this environment – no matter how ironically said – makes someone feel the divide, makes them feel like others are looking down on them.

In 2020, in the midst of the Black Lives Matter protests following the murder of George Floyd, Folds decided to also remove the song from streaming services:

I'd like to apologize for putting it out and readjust course. For all the turmoil of 2020, this moment in our history affords us a once in a lifetime opportunity to become more aware, and admit when we've been part of a problem, so we can instead be part of the solution.
