= The Bens (EP) =

EP by The Bens
- Released: March 14, 2003 (tour only); January 6, 2004 (digital); February 16, 2004 (retail)
- Recorded: 2003
- Venue: Nashville
- Genre: Rock
- Length: 14:48
- Label: EMI/BMG
- Producer: Ben Folds, Ben Kweller, Ben Lee

The Bens (EP) is the only release by the trio, The Bens, consisting of Ben Folds, Ben Kweller and Ben Lee, for the Bens Rock Over Australia tour from 14 to 28 March 2003. It had been recorded in Nashville with the three members producing. The 3,500 original pressings were only available at their early concerts but quickly sold out. Months later it was re-released on Internet stores. The lead track, "Just Pretend", was listed at number 52 in the Triple J Hottest 100, 2003, a radio listeners' poll.

== Reception ==
Professional ratings
Review scores
Source	Rating
Allmusic	3/5 stars

Jasper "Jaz" Lee of Oz Music Project opined that The Bens' "songs have an inkling of different styles, each with a particular leaning... [they] are three great artists, each of different levels of maturity in their fields, and differing in the genre of their pursuits. Yet, apart from their mutual first names there seems to be a good connection between them that was witnessed both on stage and on this EP." AllMusic's MacKenzie Wilson rated the EP at three-out-of-five stars and felt that "This little four-track gem is strictly for die-hard followers. Those who enjoy Kweller and Lee as artists should also enjoy the quirky pop selection. Folds is somewhat of a father figure to the younger Bens, and together their harmonies are matchless. Each comprises a dash of humor and innocence."

== Track listing ==
All tracks were written and produced by The Bens: Ben Folds, Ben Kweller and Ben Lee.

1. "Just Pretend" – 3:07
2. "Xfire" – 4:00
3. "Stop!" – 2:59
4. "Bruised" – 4:40

== Personnel ==
The Bens

- Ben Folds – vocals, piano, synthesiser, bass guitar, guitar, drums, producer
- Ben Kweller – vocals, guitar, drums, producer
- Ben Lee – vocals, bass guitar, guitar, producer

Production

- Greg Calbi – mastering
- Marc Chevalier – engineer
- Leon Overtoom – mastering
- Frally Hynes – photography
