= Sleigher (album) =

Studio album by Ben Folds
- Released: October 25, 2024
- Genre: Christmas music
- Length: 34:09
- Label: New West
- Producer: Ben Folds

Ben Folds chronology
What Matters Most (2023)	Sleigher (2024)

Singles from Sleigher
- 1. "We Could Have This" Released: September 25, 2024; 2. "The Christmas Song" Released: September 25, 2024

Sleigher is the sixth studio album and the first Christmas album by American singer-songwriter Ben Folds, released on October 25, 2024. It was announced on September 25, 2024, along with the release of two songs from the album, "The Christmas Song", and "We Could Have This" featuring Lindsey Kraft.

== Background ==
In an interview with Variety, Folds stated that his initial intent making the album was to be a little lazier, and do more covers, before becoming inspired to write songs for the album. He stated: "It's fun to write something almost to an assignment, and that's kind of what this was, I always kind of like something that'll just make me write. I had felt like I might be a really good curator of just really neat Christmas songs somehow, but that was a little ignorant: I was surprised not to be able to find as many covers as I thought."

== Track listing ==
All tracks are written by Ben Folds, except where noted.

Sleigher track listing
No.	Title	Writer(s)	Length
1.	"Little Drummer Bolero"		3:24
2.	"Sleepwalking Through Christmas"		4:02
3.	"Me and Maurice"		3:52
4.	"Christmas Time Rhyme"		4:34
5.	"Waiting for Snow"		1:30
6.	"We Could Have This" (featuring Lindsey Kraft)		3:51
7.	"The Christmas Song"	Mel Tormé; Robert Wells	3:15
8.	"The Bell That Couldn't Jingle"	Burt Bacharach; Larry Kusik	3:11
9.	"Xmas Aye Eye"		3:49
10.	"You Don't Have to Be a Santa Claus"	Seger Ellis	2:41
Total length:			34:09

== Personnel ==
- Ben Folds – vocals, piano, production
- Pete Lyman – mastering
- Joe Costa – mixing, engineering
- Lindsey Kraft – vocals on "We Could Have This"

== Charts ==
Chart performance for Sleigher
Chart (2024)	Peak position
Scottish Albums (OCC)	94
UK Independent Albums (OCC)	25
