= So There =

Studio album by Ben Folds
- Released: September 11, 2015
- Recorded: October 2014
- Studio: Grand Victor Sound (Nashville, Tennessee)
- Genre: Chamber pop
- Length: 51:50
- Label: New West Records

Ben Folds chronology
Live (2013)	So There (2015)	What Matters Most (2023)

Professional ratings
Aggregate scores
Source	Rating
Metacritic	66/100
Review scores
Source	Rating
AbsolutePunk	3/5 stars
AllMusic	4/5 stars
American Songwriter	3/5 stars
Consequence	58/100
Drowned in Sound	8/10 stars
Exclaim!	6/10 stars
Magnet	6/10 stars
Mojo	6/10 stars
PopMatters	6/10 stars
Q Magazine	6/10 stars
Record Collector	3/5 stars
Uncut	7/10 stars

So There is the first studio album by Ben Folds and the yMusic Ensemble, released on September 11, 2015. The album includes eight chamber pop songs and one piano concerto performed with the Nashville Symphony.

== Background and recording ==
Initially, Folds was jointly commissioned by the Nashville Ballet, Nashville Symphony, and Minnesota Orchestra to write a piano concerto, and composed "Concerto For Piano & Orchestra: Movements 1, 2 and 3". The pieces were recorded at Fold's Grand Victor Sound studio (better known as Nashville's historic RCA Studio A) with the 83-piece Nashville Symphony orchestra and producer Elliot Scheiner. Folds collaborated with the yMusic Ensemble at the same studio to create eight chamber pop songs to complete the album.

== Reception ==
On Metacritic, which assigns a normalized rating out of 100 to reviews from professional publications, So There received an average score of 66, which indicated "Generally Favorable Reviews". In a review that gave the album an 80/100, AllMusic's Marcy Donelson stated "The album will very likely be embraced by solo Folds aficionados, though it may not appeal to those who strongly favor the brasher Five."

In a more negative review, Adam Kivel from Consequence wrote, "In that sense, the orchestra draws out the purest essence of Folds. When he’s cute, he’s so remarkably cute and knows it. When he’s clever, the same holds true. When he’s singing sincerely and digging into deep emotion, the instrumentation doubles down. That makes dramatic songs like "Capable of Anything" and "I’m Not the Man" the most affective, while others are either momentarily fun or obnoxious, depending on your predisposition." Later in the same review saying "Folds' gifts for narrative and composing are clear, but fusing the two more fluidly could be something magical."

== Track listing ==
All tracks are written by Ben Folds, with additional writers noted

No.	Title	Writer(s)	Length
1.	"Capable of Anything"		3:49
2.	"Not a Fan"		3:34
3.	"So There"		4:20
4.	"Long Way to Go"		4:42
5.	"Phone in a Pool"		4:03
6.	"Yes Man"	Rob Moose	3:59
7.	"F10-D-A"		1:58
8.	"I'm Not the Man"	Alicia Witt	4:41
9.	"Concerto for Piano and Orchestra, Movement 1"		10:28
10.	"Concerto for Piano and Orchestra, Movement 2"		5:45
11.	"Concerto for Piano and Orchestra, Movement 3"		4:31

== Personnel ==
Tracks 1–8:

- Ben Folds – piano, vocals, percussion
- Rob Moose – violin, harmonies
- Nadia Sirota – viola
- Gabriel Cabezas – cello
- CJ Camerieri – trumpet, French horn
- Alex Sopp – flute, alto flute, piccolo, harmonies, cover art
- Hideaki Aomori – clarinet, bass clarinet
- Gracie Folds – harmony on "So There"

Additional musicians on Phone in a Pool:

- Sam Smith – drums
- Ryan Lerman – guitar
- Chad Chapin – percussion
- Andrew Higley – synthesizer and additional arranging

Tracks 9–11:

- Ben Folds – Yamaha Concert Grand piano
- Nashville Symphony Orchestra – various orchestral instruments

== Charts ==
Chart (2015)	Peak position
UK Albums (OCC)	63
US Billboard 200	44
