= Tall Heights =

American electrofolk band

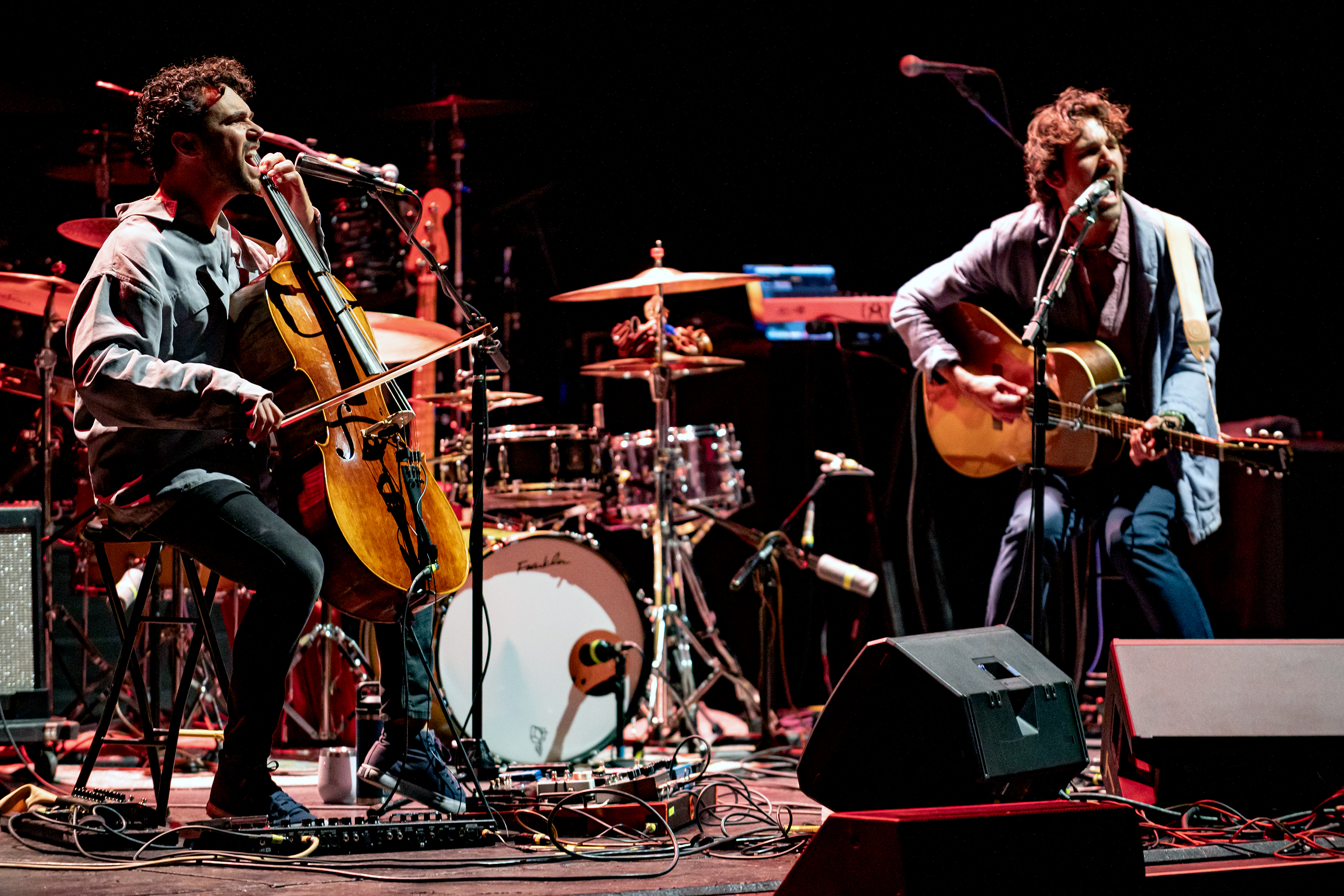
- Tall Heights in The Wiltern

Background information
- Origin: Boston, Massachusetts
- Genres: Electrofolk; Indie folk
- Years active: 2009–present
- Labels: United For Opportunity, Sony Masterworks
- Members: Tim Harrington; Paul Wright; Paul Dumas
- Website: www.tallheights.com

Tall Heights is an electrofolk duo based in Boston, Massachusetts. The group was formed in 2009 and consists of the singer/guitarist Tim Harrington and the singer/cellist Paul Wright. Tours have also featured the percussionist/singer Paul Dumas. Their albums are Man of Stone, Neptune, Pretty Colors For Your Actions, Juniors, and Softly Softly.

== Biography ==
Harrington and Wright met in their hometown of Sturbridge, Massachusetts. They began busking in Boston, keeping their songs to the essential elements to make them easier to perform on the street. Shortly thereafter, Ryan Montbleau took the band under his wing after watching them perform at the Lizard Lounge Open Mic Challenge in Cambridge, Massachusetts. Montbleau and Tall Heights began performing together, releasing an EP, All or Nothing / Fast Car, in 2014. Tall Heights established itself as a Boston indie-folk staple alongside The Ballroom Thieves and Darlingside.

Their first EP, Rafters, and their first full-length album, Man of Stone, reflect the acoustic sound of Harrington's guitar, Wright's cello, and their voices. For their 2015 EP, Holding On, Holding Out, they expanded their sound with drums, electric guitar, and keyboards. The single, "Spirit Cold", was premiered on The Wall Street Journal on August 19, 2015. According to Wright, the song's lyrics are about "staying present and awake to the bad, but also the good that's around us". Its accompanying music video was premiered by Paste on January 28, 2016.

The band's sound has been compared to Bon Iver, Fleet Foxes, and Arcade Fire. They have performed with artists such as Ben Folds, Blind Pilot, José González, Wild Child, Lola Marsh, Shook Twins and Gregory Alan Isakov. The band has recorded a World Cafe session with David Dye and performed on NPR's Mountain Stage. Holding on, Holding Out and Neptune were produced by Oliver Hill of Pavo Pavo.

Tall Heights announced their first major label album, Neptune, with a premiere of "River Wider" on Stereogum. Fuse premiered the next single, "Iron in the Fire", calling it "breathtaking", and NPR premiered the lyric video for Infrared. Spin magazine listed the band as one of "Five New Artists You Should Hear" and Paste included them in it "Best of What's Next" series. Tall Heights' made their first late night television appearance was performing "Spirit Cold" on Conan on September 26, 2016.

On July 10, 2018, the band announced a third full-length album, Pretty Colors For Your Actions, to be released on the Sony Masterworks label.

On January 14, 2022, Tall Heights released their fourth full-length studio album, Juniors. It was followed by Softly Softly, released October 18, 2024.

== Discography ==
- Smoke Signals (2009)
- Rafters (EP) (2011)
- The Running of the Bulls (EP) (2012)
- Man of Stone (2013)
- All or Nothing / Fast Car (2014) (with Ryan Montbleau)
- Holding On, Holding Out (EP) (2015) – United for Opportunity
- Neptune (2016) – Sony Masterworks
- Pretty Colors For Your Actions (2018) – Sony Masterworks
- Juniors (2022) – Tall Heights and Many Hats Distribution
- Softly Softly (2024)
