= Super D =

EP by Ben Folds
- Released: August 24, 2004
- Length: 18:33
- Label: Attacked By Plastic

Ben Folds chronology
| Sunny 16 (2003) | Super D (2004) | Songs for Silverman (2005) |

Singles from Super D
- 1. "Adelaide" Released: 2005

Professional ratings
Review scores
| Source | Rating |
|---|---|
| Allmusic | 2.5/5 stars |

Super D is an EP by Ben Folds, the last of 3 in a series released between Rockin' the Suburbs and Songs for Silverman. It has three original songs and two covers: The Darkness' "Get Your Hands Off My Woman", and a live performance of Ray Charles' "Them That Got", included as a tribute to Charles who had recently died. Folds wrote "Kalamazoo" when he was 19, and knocked it around for years on demo tapes before inclusion here, adding a disco-like string section "because [he] could". "Adelaide" is an affectionate piece inspired by Adelaide, South Australia where Folds once made his home. The song became a hit in Australia, reaching #37 on the Triple J Hottest 100 that year. Ben Folds' ex-wife, Frally Hynes, is featured on the album cover.

== Track listing ==
All tracks are written by Ben Folds, except where noted.

| No. | Title | Writer(s) | Length |
|---|---|---|---|
| 1. | "Get Your Hands Off My Woman" (The Darkness cover) | Justin Hawkins; Dan Hawkins; Frankie Poullain; Ed Graham | 3:40 |
| 2. | "Kalamazoo" | | 4:26 |
| 3. | "Adelaide" | | 3:13 |
| 4. | "Rent a Cop" | | 5:12 |
| 5. | "Them That Got" (live Ray Charles cover) | Ricci Harper | 2:02 |
