= Way to Normal =

Studio album by Ben Folds
- Released: September 17, 2008
- Recorded: Ben Folds' Recording Studio, Nashville, TN
- Genre: Alternative rock
- Label: Epic
- Producer: Dennis Herring

Ben Folds chronology
Supersunnyspeedgraphic, the LP (2006)	Way to Normal (2008)	Stems and Seeds (2009)

Alternative cover
- Cover for the fake leak version of the album

Professional ratings
Aggregate scores
Source	Rating
Metacritic	(62/100)
Review scores
Source	Rating
AbsolutePunk	56%
Allmusic	3/5 stars
The Austin Chronicle	3/5 stars
The A.V. Club	C+
Drowned in Sound	(8/10)
Entertainment Weekly	B+
musicOMH	4/5 stars
Paste	8.9/10
The Phoenix	1.5/4 stars
Pitchfork Media	2.7/10
PopMatters	8/10 stars
Rolling Stone	2.5/5 stars
Spin	(6/10)
Uncut	3/5 stars

Way to Normal is the third studio album by Ben Folds. It was released in Japan on September 17, 2008, in Australia on September 27, in UK and Europe on September 29, and in the US on September 30. The album is Folds' highest-charting solo album in the US, reaching #11 on the Billboard 200 in its first week of release.

A music video for "You Don't Know Me" was directed by Eric Wareheim, featuring Wareheim himself and his comedy partner Tim Heidecker.

In 2009, Folds re-released the album in less compressed audio quality as Stems and Seeds, adding various bonus tracks and providing "stems" for fans to create their own remixes.

== Track listing ==
All tracks are written by Ben Folds.

Way to Normal
No.	Title	Length
1.	"Hiroshima (B-B-B-Benny Hit His Head)"	3:38
2.	"Dr. Yang"	2:30
3.	"The Frown Song"	3:38
4.	"You Don't Know Me" (featuring Regina Spektor)	3:12
5.	"Before Cologne"	0:54
6.	"Cologne"	5:03
7.	"Errant Dog"	2:24
8.	"Free Coffee"	3:08
9.	"Bitch Went Nuts" (length includes a 52-second pregap)	3:58
10.	"Brainwascht"	3:49
11.	"Effington"	3:33
12.	"Kylie from Connecticut"	4:43

Japanese bonus tracks
No.	Title	Length
1.	"Way to Normal"	4:10
2.	"Free Coffee Town"	2:42
3.	"Frowne Song (Feeble Anthem)"	3:50
4.	"Cologne" (piano orchestra version)	6:08

== Personnel ==
- Ben Folds - piano, Moog synthesizer, Wurlitzer, mellotron, vocals
- Jared Reynolds - electric bass guitar, backing vocals (holding coffee cup on album cover)
- Sam Smith - drums, backing vocals (holding umbrella on album cover)
- Dennis Herring - drums on "You Don't Know Me"
- Regina Spektor - vocals on "You Don't Know Me"

== Production notes ==
The album is named after Normal, Illinois, as referenced in the track "Effington". "Effington" refers to Effingham, Illinois.

The song "Hiroshima" is about a time when Folds fell off the stage during a concert in Hiroshima, Japan. The subtitle "B B B Benny Hit His Head" is a reference to the Elton John song "Bennie and the Jets". John says "B B B Bennie" during the main chorus, which Hiroshima's subtitle mimics. Both songs have a fake audience in the background, as well as having a similar melody with different timing.

The metallic percussive effect on "Free Coffee" was achieved by placing Altoids tins on top of the piano strings and feeding the audio output through a distortion pedal; Folds demonstrated this in live performances of the song. (See prepared piano)

"Dr. Yang" was used in the trailer for the 2011 film, Mars Needs Moms.

"Dr. Yang" appeared in episode 4 of the BBC Three sitcom, We Are Klang

"Before Cologne" was used for the introduction of the iPhone 4S and in a commercial for the Honda Accord in 2015.

== Fake leak ==
On July 16, 2008, an anonymous user posted what they claimed was a "leak" of Folds's latest album on two fan sites. The file contained nine tracks along with a PDF of supposed cover art, and was a mix of what appeared to be legitimate songs from Way to Normal and bizarre pastiches of foul-mouthed humor and melodramatic pop. Accordingly, the online forums became full of debate as to which were real and which were fake until August 12, 2008, when Folds admitted on Triple J radio that many songs in the leak were fake. He claimed that he and the band recorded fake versions of songs from the new album when they "had a night to kill in Dublin", and had a friend leak it to the public "to give them something to listen to".

After confirming that the leaked "Brainwashed", "The Frown Song" and "Free Coffee Town" were fake, he said that they would be used as B-sides and bonus tracks on future releases. A few days later, in a Rolling Stone article, Folds discussed the differences between the real album cuts and the fake leak cuts. All nine tracks were released on the 2009 compilation album, Stems and Seeds. The "long way to go" coda of the "fake" track "Way to Normal" was later adapted into "Long Way to Go", a song on Folds' 2015 album, So There.

=== Leak track listing ===
All lyrics are written by Ben Folds except where noted; all music is composed by Ben Folds.

Way to Normal (fake leak)
No.	Title	Length
1.	"Brainwashed" (lyrics by Sam Smith)	3:36
2.	"Way to Normal"	4:10
3.	"Lovesick Diagnostician (Dr. Yang)"	2:53
4.	"Free Coffee Town" (lyrics by Jared Reynolds)	2:42
5.	"Bitch Went Nutz"	3:53
6.	"Frowne Song (Feeble Anthem)" (lyrics by Sam Smith)	3:50
7.	"Cologne" (piano orchestra version)	6:07
8.	"Hiroshima^{†}"	3:38
9.	"You Don't Know Me^{†}" (featuring Regina Spektor)	3:10

- ^{†} - Real version of song featured on main album
- "Cologne" (piano orchestra version) is a bonus track on the iTunes version of the album. "Bitch Went Nutz" was available to those who pre-ordered the album.

== Charts ==
=== Album ===
Year	Chart	Position
2008	US Albums Chart	11
2008	UK Albums Chart	70
