= Jesusland (song) =

Single by Ben Folds

from the album Songs for Silverman
- Released: 2005
- Genre: Rock
- Length: 4:30
- Label: Epic
- Songwriter: Ben Folds

Ben Folds singles chronology
"Landed" (2005)	"Jesusland" (2005)	"You Don't Know Me" (2008)

Music video
- "Jesusland" on YouTube

"Jesusland" was the second single from Ben Folds' 2005 album Songs for Silverman. The song captures Folds' dismay as he travels through middle America, witnessing the growing wealth and the commercialization of Jesus' message. Per Folds, "'Jesusland' is sort of a walk across the country. You know, 'There’s a billboard, there’s a McMansion, there’s a couple nice houses'... just trying to put together a montage that recreates the playing field as you have it."

It reached No. 42 on the UK airplay chart in October 2005. It has also been playlisted by Xfm London and BBC Radio 2 (which lists it as "download only"). It reached No. 8 on the Radio Two chart. The track was slated for a UK single release in September 2005, but it never made it to store shelves.

The video for the single features Matt Lucas as a televangelist interspersed with scenes of a journey through what may well be "Jesusland" itself. The pair became friends after Lucas interviewed Folds for NME.

The track was featured in the 2008 Bill Maher comedic documentary Religulous.

== Chart history ==
Chart	Peak position
UK Singles (OCC)	42

== Other notable performances ==
- "Jesusland - University A Cappella Version" was first performed by The University of North Carolina at Chapel Hill's Loreleis in 2008 for Ben Folds' University A Capella album.
- Folds performed "Jesusland" on Minnesota Public Radio's Live from Here with Chris Thile on their June 15, 2019 show.
