= Stems and Seeds =

Compilation album by Ben Folds
- Released: (United States) (United Kingdom) February 10, 2009
- Genre: Alternative rock
- Label: Epic

Ben Folds chronology
Way to Normal (2008)	Stems and Seeds (2009)	Ben Folds Presents: University A Cappella! (2009)

Professional ratings
Review scores
Source	Rating
Allmusic	3/5 stars

Stems and Seeds is a 2009 album by Ben Folds. It is a remastered version of his previous album Way to Normal in a different track order. Folds explained its release as being due to popular demand, as many fans requested a less compressed version.

The first disc consists of stem files that can be used in computer applications such as GarageBand to produce remixes. The second disc has the remastered album with various bonus tracks; the fake songs from the original leak of Way to Normal, a live rehearsal take of "You Don't Know Me" and a Japanese-language version of "Hiroshima".

== Track listing ==
=== Disc one - isolated audio tracks ===
1. "Effington"
2. "Frown Song"
3. "Dr. Yang"
4. "You Don't Know Me"
5. "Free Coffee"
6. "Cologne"
7. "Bitch Went Nuts"
8. "Hiroshima"
9. "Kylie From Connecticut"
10. "Errant Dog"
11. "Brainwascht"

=== Disc two ===
1. "Effington"
2. "Frown Song"
3. "Dr. Yang"
4. "You Don't Know Me"
5. "Free Coffee"
6. "Cologne"
7. "Bitch Went Nuts"
8. "Hiroshima"
9. "Kylie From Connecticut"
10. "Errant Dog"
11. "Brainwascht"
12. "Cologne" (Piano Orchestra Version)
13. "Bitch Went Nutz"
14. "Way to Normal"
15. "Free Coffee Town"
16. "Lovesick Diagnostician"
17. "Frowne Song (Feeble Anthem)"
18. "You Don't Know Me" (Conan O'Brien Rehearsal)
19. "Hiroshima" (Japanese Version)
20. "Brainwashed"
