= YMusic =

Chamber music ensemble

yMusic
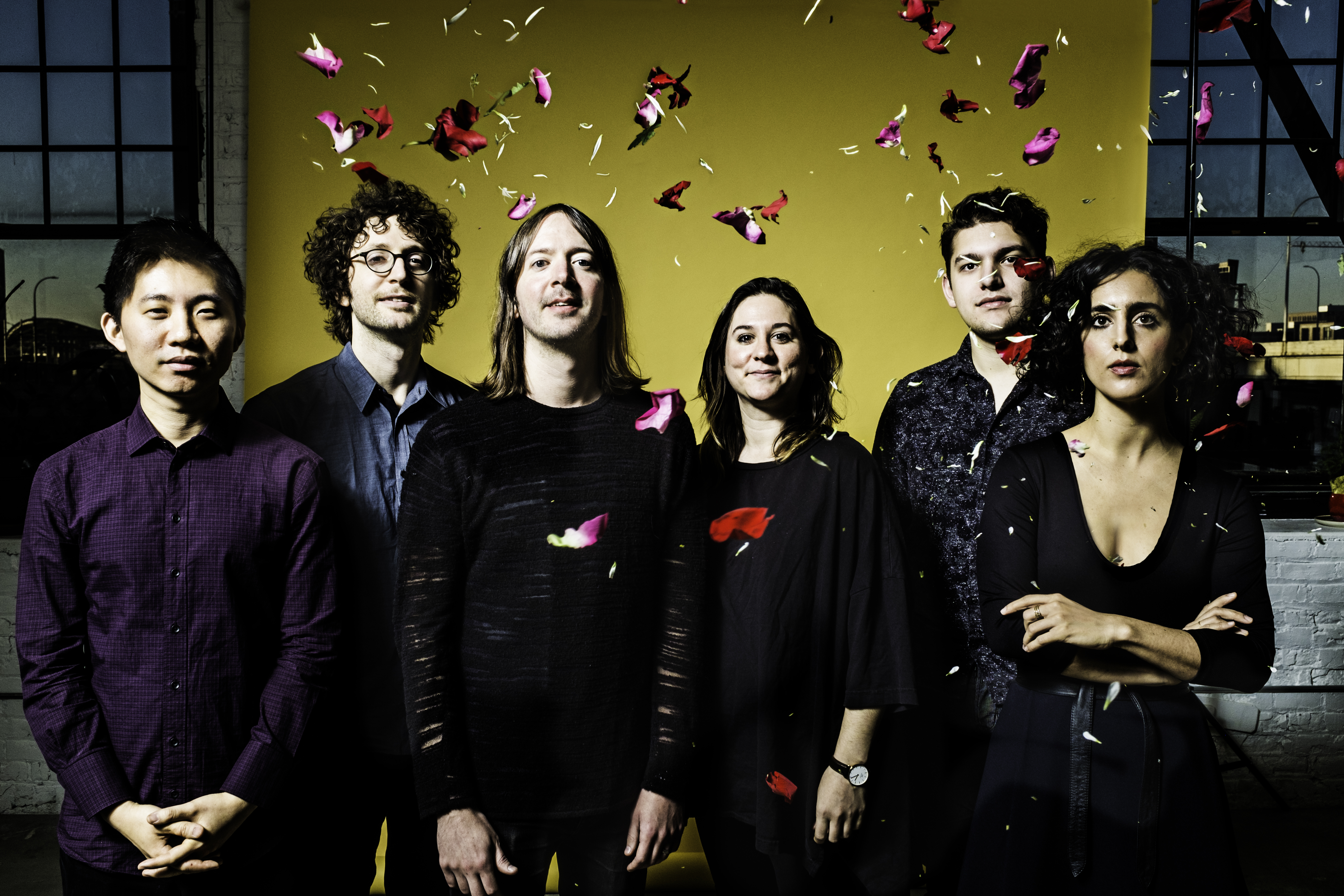
- yMusic in 2015

Background information
- Origin: New York City, United States
- Genres: Chamber, Orchestra
- Years active: 2008–present
- Members: Alex Sopp; CJ Camerieri; Gabriel Cabezas; Hideaki Aomori; Nadia Sirota; Rob Moose
- Past members: Clarice Jensen
- Website: www.ymusicensemble.com

yMusic is an American sextet chamber ensemble from New York City. Consisting of a trumpet, flute, clarinet, violin, viola, and cello, the group was formed in Brooklyn by the trumpeter CJ Camerieri and the violinist Rob Moose in 2008.

== Career ==
The ensemble has released three studio albums of original compositions written for the group, and has toured extensively with artists such as José González, Bon Iver and Paul Simon. In 2015, yMusic collaborated with Ben Folds on his album So There, and toured with him in support. yMusic made their Carnegie Hall debut in 2016, premiering a piece by Caroline Shaw and one by Chris Thile. The ensemble performs with The Staves on that group's 2017 release The Way Is Read. In 2019, yMusic was credited on four tracks of Bruce Hornsby's album Absolute Zero. This led to further work on Hornsby's subsequent album 'Flicted and a full album collaboration as BrhyM in 2024 entitled Deep Sea Vents, co-produced by Moose.

== Personnel ==
- Alex Sopp – flute
- CJ Camerieri – trumpet
- Gabriel Cabezas – cello
- Hideaki Aomori – clarinet
- Nadia Sirota – viola
- Rob Moose – violin

=== Former personnel ===
- Clarice Jensen – cello

== Discography ==
=== Studio albums ===
- Beautiful Mechanical – New Amsterdam Records (2011)
- Balance Problems – New Amsterdam Records (2014)
- First – Communal Table (2017), music composed by Ryan Lott of Son Lux
- The Way Is Read with The Staves – Nonesuch Records (2017)
- Ecstatic Science – New Amsterdam (2020)
- YMUSIC (2023)

=== EPs ===
- The Year of the Dragon (2013)
- A Collaborative EP with yMusic (2017)

=== Collaborations ===
- So There (2015) with Ben Folds
- "Never In This House", "Voyager One", "The Blinding Light of Dreams", "Take You There (Misty)" (2019) with Bruce Hornsby on Absolute Zero
- "Is This It", Had Enough" (2022) with Bruce Hornsby on 'Flicted
- Deep Sea Vents (2024) with Bruce Hornsby as BrhyM
