= Venus and the Moon =

- Origin: Los Angeles, California
- Genres: Galactic, country, alternative
- Instrument(s): Vocals, piano, guitar
- Years active: 2014–present
- Labels: Mother May Records
- Members: Frally Hynes; Rain Phoenix
- Website: venusandthemoon.net

Venus and the Moon are an American "galactic country" duo, composed of Frally Hynes and Rain Phoenix. Propelled to success by social media, their debut studio album, Brother, Son, is a concept album about the important men in their life. It was released on July 15, 2016. Rain engineered and recorded the whole album.

The duo's music is inspired by Dolly Parton, Emmylou Harris, and Linda Ronstadt.

== History ==
=== Venus and the Moon ===
Hynes and Phoenix met at a friend's birthday party in Los Angeles. At the party they started to sing live together and were intrigued by each other's harmonies and interests.

Their debut single "Hungry Ghost" was released on November 11, 2014. The accompanying music video was released through YouTube on November 17, 2014.

On November 11, 2014, they released their self-titled extended play on Mother May Records.

"Die Slow" was the first song they had written together as a duo, which later appeared on their debut album Brother, Son (2016).

=== Brother, Son ===
The band started recording their debut album in late 2015. Recording was conducted in Los Angeles, on a Tascam four-track that belonged to Rain's brother, River Phoenix. "River would always four-track, and I would come in and sing harmonies on his stuff. It was very tactile for me. It was so cool."

They released the album's lead single "Marry Me" on June 10, 2016. The accompanying music video was released through YouTube on July 15, 2016. On July 15, 2016, the band also revealed the release date, cover art and track listing for the album, entitled Brother, Son.

On September 14, 2016, the second single "Porch Swing" was released.

== Discography ==
=== Extended plays ===
"Venus and the Moon" (2014)

=== Studio albums ===
- Brother, Son (2016)
