= Ben Folds =

American musician (born 1966)

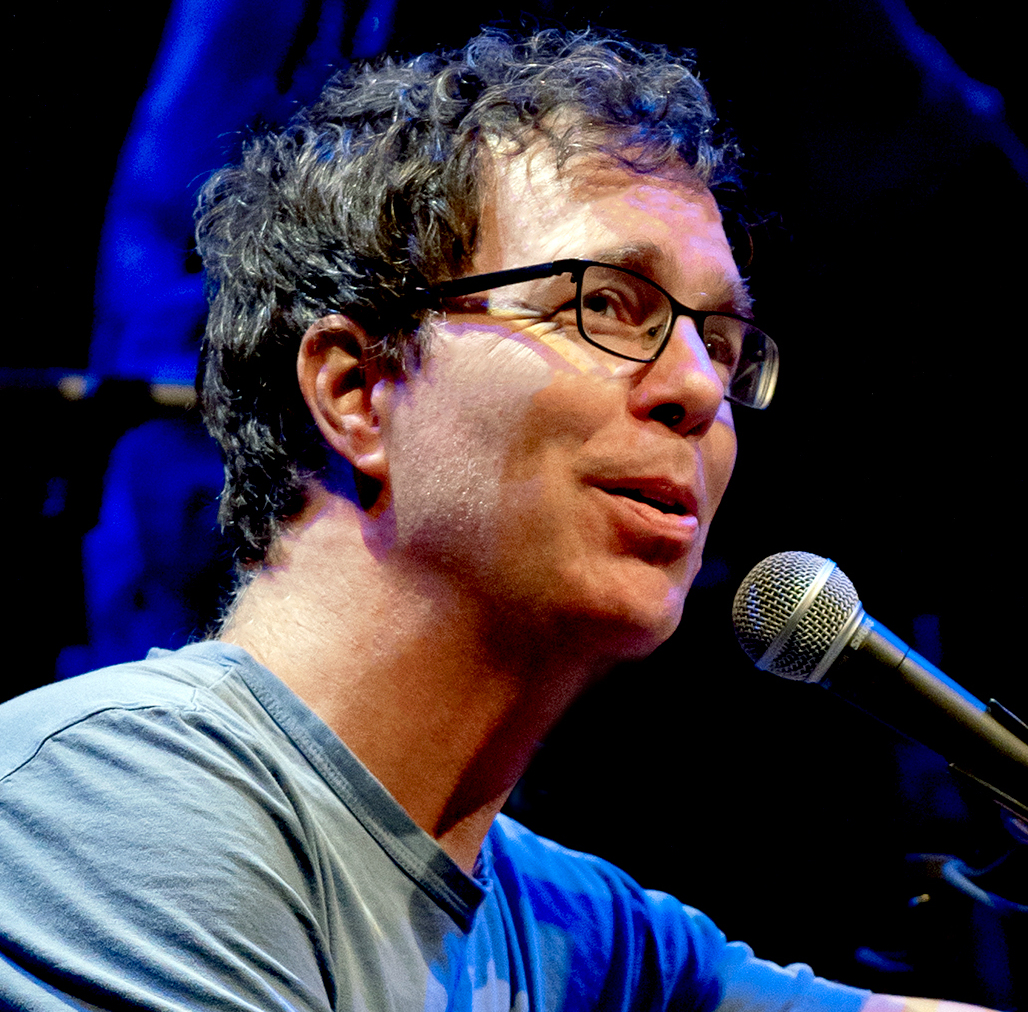
- Folds in 2023

Background information
- Born: Benjamin Scott Folds; September 12, 1966 (age 60); Winston-Salem, North Carolina, U.S.
- Genres: Alternative rock; power pop
- Occupations: Singer; songwriter; record producer; multi-instrumentalist
- Instruments: Vocals; piano; keyboards; drums; bass guitar; guitar
- Years active: 1988–present
- Labels: Attacked by Plastic; Epic; New West
- Member of: Ben Folds Five
- Formerly of: The Semantics; Majosha; Bus Stop; The Bens
- Spouses: Anna Goodman (m. 1987; div. 1992) Katie Rosen (m. 1996; div. 1996) Frally Hynes (m. 1999; div. 2006) Fleur Stanbrook (m. 2007; div. 2011) Emma Sandall (m. 2017; div. 2024)
- Website: benfolds.com

Artistic Advisor to the National Symphony Orchestra at the Kennedy Center
- In office 2017–2025

Benjamin Scott Folds (born September 12, 1966) is an American singer-songwriter. After playing in several small independent bands from the late 1980s through the early '90s, Folds came to prominence as the frontman and pianist of the alternative rock trio Ben Folds Five from 1993 to 2000, their first reunion from 2011 to 2013, and since 2026. He has also collaborated with musicians such as Regina Spektor, "Weird Al" Yankovic and yMusic, and undertaken experimental songwriting projects with actor William Shatner and authors such as Nick Hornby and Neil Gaiman. Folds was the artistic advisor to the National Symphony Orchestra at the Kennedy Center in Washington, D.C. from 2017 until 2025.

Folds has frequently performed arrangements of his music with uncommon instrumentation for rock and pop music, including symphony orchestras and a cappella groups. In addition to contributing music to the soundtracks of the animated films Hoodwinked! (2005) and Over the Hedge (2006), Folds has produced several albums, including Amanda Palmer's debut solo album, Who Killed Amanda Palmer (2008).

Folds was also a judge on the NBC a cappella singing contest The Sing-Off from 2009 to 2013. In July 2019, he published his first book, a memoir titled A Dream About Lightning Bugs.

== Early life and education ==
Folds was born in 1966 to Dean and Scotty Folds (née Kellam; born 1945) in Winston-Salem, North Carolina. His paternal grandmother was from West Virginia. He became interested in piano at age nine. His father, a carpenter, brought one home through a barter trade with a customer who was unable to pay. During this time, Folds listened to songs by Elton John and Billy Joel on AM radio, and learned them by ear. As a child, child psychologists told his mother he was considered to be “slow”, which he and his mother acknowledged as meaning he was creative. He stated he started listening to “7 hours of records” when he was 2 years old, including “Hold On, I'm Comin'” by Sam & Dave. During his years at Richard J. Reynolds High School in Winston-Salem, Folds played in several bands as the pianist, bassist, or drummer.

Folds attended the University of Miami's Frost School of Music on a full percussion scholarship, but dropped out after having failed "the jury" and lost his scholarship. He devoted a lot of time to working on piano technique. "I spent maybe six months just running scales with a metronome like a freak", Folds said. "I suppose that did something."

After leaving Miami, he returned to North Carolina and enrolled at the University of North Carolina at Greensboro for the fall semester of 1985. It was while studying at UNCG that he met his "accidental mentor", Robert Darnell. Folds would acknowledge the impact of Darnell on his appreciation of music in his 2019 memoir A Dream About Lightning Bugs.

== Career ==
=== Majosha and early career ===
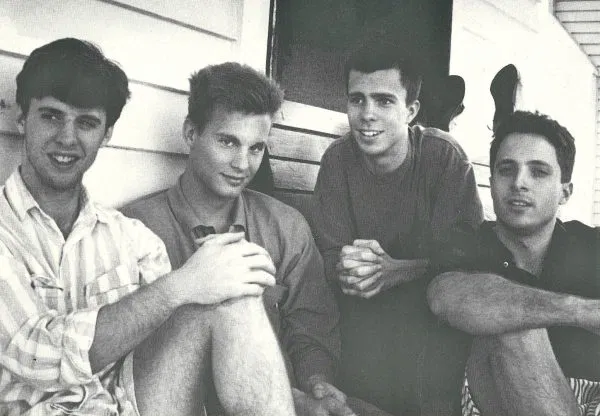
Ben Folds (third from left) in a promotional photo for Majosha

In the late 1980s, Folds (as a bassist) formed the band Majosha with longtime friends Evan Olson, Millard Powers, and Eddie Walker. The group released several locally produced records. They played their first gig at Duke University's Battle of the Bands in 1988, and won. They played at bars and fraternity parties, and self-produced an EP called Party Night: Five Songs About Jesus (1988), which they sold locally. The EP has four songs, none of which are about Jesus. They recorded Shut Up and Listen to Majosha in 1989. It contains, among other tracks, the four songs from Party Night (remixed and/or re-recorded) and "Emaline" and "Video", which Folds would later record with Ben Folds Five. The song "Get That Bug" from Party Night was released as a dance mix in Japan.

After Majosha broke up, Folds played drums in a band called Pots and Pans with Evan Olson on bass and Britt "Snüzz" Uzzell on guitar and vocals, but the newly formed band lasted only about a month. Olson and Uzzell formed Bus Stop with Folds's younger brother, Chuck Folds, on bass, and Eddie Walker on drums.

Folds eventually got a music publishing deal with Nashville music executive Scott Siman who saw Folds open for musician Marc Silvey, as well as playing bass for Silvey's band Mass Confusion, and moved to Nashville, Tennessee, to pursue it in 1990. He played drums for a short stint in Power Bill, headed by Jody Spence, Millard Powers, and Will Owsley. Power Bill were later renamed the Semantics. Folds did not take a creative role in the band. He attracted interest from major labels. He ended up playing drums in Nashville as a session musician:

In Nashville, I was running eight miles a day, hanging out with my friends, walking around eating chocolate-chip cookies and playing a lot of drums, which I enjoyed. Life was easy. I was never frustrated—even though I wasn't fulfilling my contract obligations. If you are failing in Nashville, at least your standard of living is nice. Nashville is a nice way to fail.

Folds moved to Montclair, New Jersey, and began to act in theater troupes in New York City. Around 1993, he was enjoying this to the point where he did not want to keep pursuing a musical career. He also played weekly gigs at Sin-é, famous for being the café which had helped start Jeff Buckley's career.

=== Ben Folds Five (1994–2000) ===
Folds moved back to North Carolina and formed Ben Folds Five in 1994, with bassist Robert Sledge and drummer Darren Jessee, in Chapel Hill. As Folds put it, "Jeff Buckley was being signed at that time by Columbia and I was talking to Steve, his A&R guy, and somehow we knew the same people or something." In 1995, Ben Folds Five released their self-titled debut album. The debut was followed by Whatever and Ever Amen in 1997, and the odds-and-ends compilation Naked Baby Photos was released in early 1998. Whatever and Ever Amen included many singles such as "Song for the Dumped", "Battle of Who Could Care Less", and the band's most successful song, "Brick". In 1999, the band released what was to be their final album for over a decade, The Unauthorized Biography of Reinhold Messner, which included the hit "Army".

Folds has described Ben Folds Five as "punk rock for sissies", and his lyrics often contain nuances of melancholy, self-conflict, and humorous sarcasm, often punctuated by profanity.

Early in their career, Ben Folds Five gained a strong following in the United Kingdom and Australia. As with many other "alternative" American acts, this was largely due to consistent support from national broadcasters in those countries: in Britain the BBC and in Australia the ABC's Triple J youth radio network and ABC-TV's music video show Rage. The group's first chart breakthrough came in the UK, when "Underground" made the lower reaches of the Top 40, peaking at no. 37. Britain was the band's strongest territory in terms of chart success, with five singles making the national Top 40 there—"Underground", "Battle of Who Could Care Less", "Kate", "Brick" and "Army"—although none managed to crack the UK Top 20. In Australia, "Underground" likewise broke the band locally and while it did not make the ARIA chart, it came in at no. 3 on the 1996 Triple J Hottest 100 poll (broadcast on January 26, 1997). The 1998 single "Brick" became the group's only major chart placing in Australia, reaching no. 13; it also came in at no. 53 in the ARIA Australian Top 100 for that year and earned a Gold Record award while its parent album Whatever and Ever Amen peaked at no. 9 and charted for 32 weeks. Following their tour in support for The Unauthorized Biography of Reinhold Messner, the band decided to amicably break up, with each of the band members pursuing different projects.

=== Rockin' the Suburbs to Supersunnyspeedgraphic (2001–2007) ===
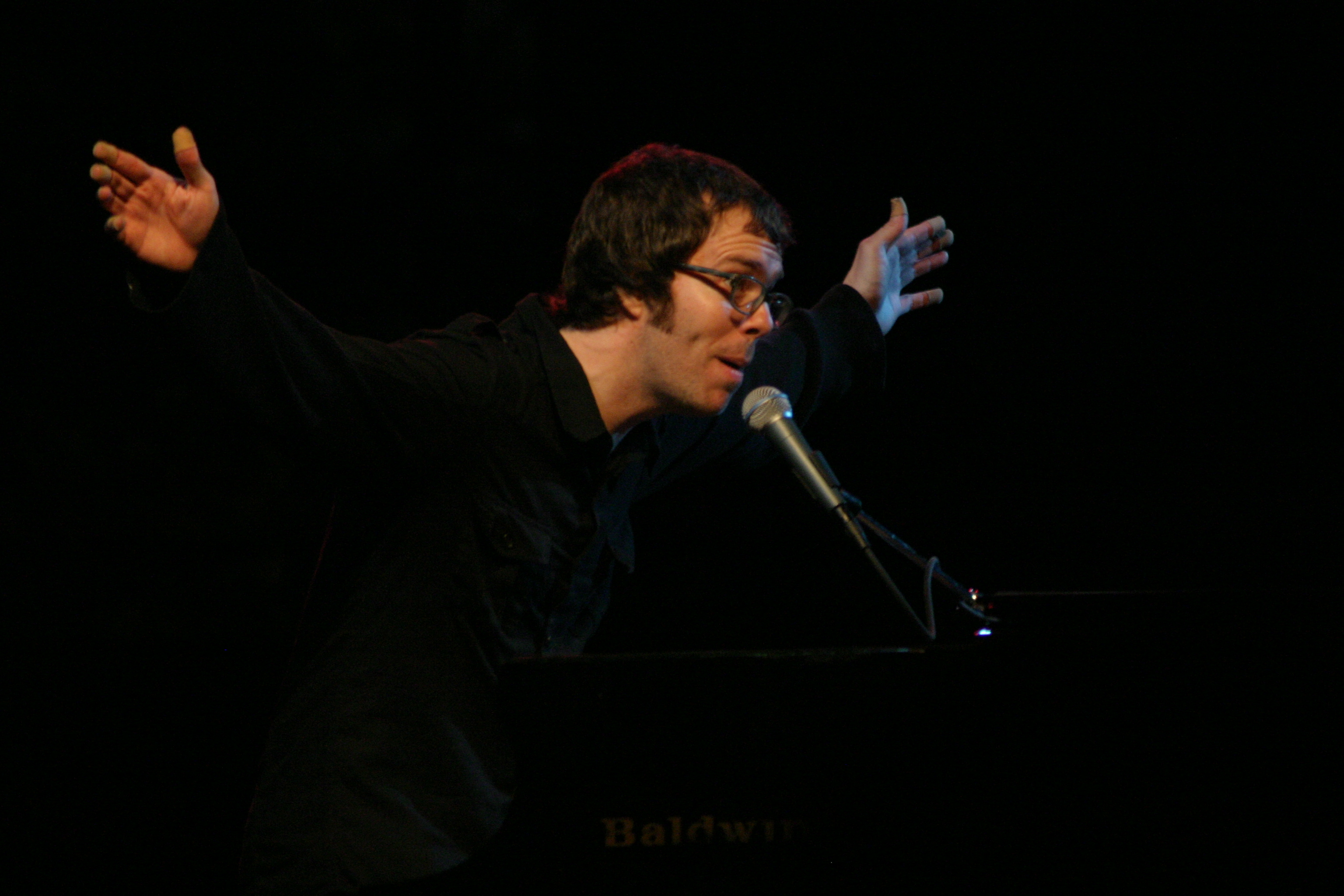
Folds performing in Knoxville, Tennessee, 2006

Folds's first solo album after the breakup of the band was Rockin' the Suburbs in 2001, released on the same day as the September 11 attacks. He played nearly all the instruments, most notably guitar, an instrument seldom used during the Ben Folds Five days. "The Luckiest" was written for the Amy Heckerling movie Loser, but the scene it was meant for was deleted. Millard Powers, Britt "Snüzz" Uzzell, and Jim Bogios joined Folds on the promotional tour of the album. "Weird Al" Yankovic directed and appeared in Folds's video for the album's namesake song, "Rockin' the Suburbs". Folds's friend and fellow musician John McCrea, lead singer of the band Cake, contributed vocals to "Fred Jones, Part 2".

A year later, Folds released Ben Folds Live, a collection of live solo recordings. In late 2003, two solo EPs, Speed Graphic and Sunny 16, were self-released on Folds's label Attacked by Plastic. The last EP, Super D, was released in mid-2004.

Songs for Silverman was released in the United States on April 26, 2005. The album returned to the trio format, featuring Jared Reynolds on bass and Lindsay Jamieson on drums. This album includes the track "Late", a tribute to the late singer-songwriter Elliott Smith, and also features backup vocals from "Weird Al" Yankovic on "Time". Folds had played piano for Yankovic's song "Why Does This Always Happen to Me?" on his Poodle Hat album.

On October 24, 2006, Folds released Supersunnyspeedgraphic, the LP, a compilation of songs that were originally released on the EPs Sunny 16, Speed Graphic, and Super D. He announced on his MySpace blog that he planned to work on his next studio album in October 2006, although recording did not actually start until 2007. On that same day, Folds became the first person to webcast a live-by-request concert over MySpace. The concert was complete with pranks staged ahead of time by Folds, including a drunk man falling over the balcony during "Jesusland" and a "suicide attempt" by Folds at the end. The concert is also notable for featuring a "guitorchestra", a group of acoustic guitarists from Nashville who accompanied Folds on some songs, as well as an impromptu ringtone orchestra made up of audience members playing their cellphone's ringtones in unison. A DVD of the performance, "Live at MySpace," was released on February 20, 2007.

=== Way to Normal to Ben Folds Five reunion (2008–2013) ===
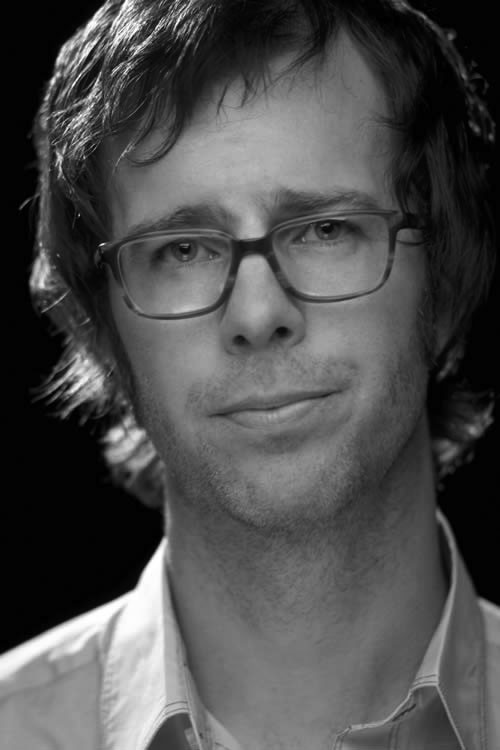
Folds in 2007

During a concert at the National Theatre in Richmond, Virginia, on April 11, 2008, Folds announced that he had completed his newest album, and played four tracks from it. He played the first track, "Hiroshima", at the show. He also debuted new music at an impromptu gig at the Exit/In on December 19, 2007, and at the Ann Arbor Folk Festival on January 25, 2008. Other new songs included "Errant Dog," "Effington," "Bitch Went Nuts," "Free Coffee," and "Kylie From Connecticut." Folds played The 6th Annual Langerado on March 8, 2008, and was a part of the lineup for the 2008 Bonnaroo Music and Arts Festival.

On July 16, 2008, an anonymous user posted what they claimed was a "leak" of Folds's latest album on a fan site (eventually called Way to Normal (Fake)). The file contained nine tracks along with a PDF of supposed cover art, and was a mix of what appeared to be legitimate songs from Way to Normal, pastiches of dry humor and melodramatic pop interwoven with bright, energetic melodies. Folds explained on Triple J radio a few weeks later that in one overnight session in Dublin he and the band had recorded "fake" versions of songs from the new album. His sources had then leaked them to the public as a light-hearted joke on his fans.

Ben Folds Five reunited to perform its first concert appearance in nearly 10 years on September 18, 2008, at the University of North Carolina at Chapel Hill's Memorial Hall. The one-off gig was part of MySpace's "Front to Back" series, in which artists played an entire album live. The band played The Unauthorized Biography of Reinhold Messner. All proceeds from ticket sales benefited the charity Operation Smile, of which Folds's uncle, Jim Folds, is on the board of directors for the North Carolina Chapter.

Way to Normal was released on September 30, 2008, in the United States and on September 29, 2008, in the United Kingdom. It became Folds's highest-charting album ever in the US, debuting at no. 11 on the Billboard 200. Fan reception of the album was rather mixed, with several citing the heavy use of dynamic compression as a major downfall of the album. Folds responded, releasing a more "traditional" mix of the album entitled Stems and Seeds, featuring various bonus tracks such as the entire "leaked" album and providing stems that allowed fans to create remixes.

On April 28, 2009, Folds released Ben Folds Presents: University A Cappella!, an album consisting of college students' a cappella arrangements of his music performed by some of the country's best college a cappella groups.

In March 2010, a video Folds created titled "Ode To Merton" went viral on YouTube. In the video, Folds improvises several songs about people that he sees on the social networking site Chatroulette, in the style of "Merton," a YouTube creator who many initially thought was Folds himself.

Folds's final solo album before his reunion with Ben Folds Five, a collaboration with English author Nick Hornby, was entitled Lonely Avenue and was released on September 28, 2010. Announced shortly before the release of Way to Normal, the idea of the collaboration came out of the "fake" leak of the album released in July 2008. "(We will) write and record it in about three days, just like we did in Dublin with the fake record," Folds said. As schedules began to misalign, the plans for the album began to change and take on the form of a more major release. On June 14, 2010, Folds released the official album art via his Twitter account. "From Above", the first single from the album, premiered on Richard Kingsmill's new music show 2010 on Triple J in Australia on July 18, 2010. "From Above" features Australian singer Kate Miller-Heidke on backing vocals. Folds also recorded a video song with Nick Hornby and Pomplamoose. English YouTuber Charlotte McDonnell (formerly Charlie McDonnell) was commissioned to create the music video for Folds's song "Saskia Hamilton", which was uploaded on October 1, 2010.

The band reunited in 2011 with a subsequent release of the album The Sound of the Life of the Mind, leading to a tour of their new work throughout 2012 and 2013.

=== So There and the National Symphony Orchestra (2014–2022) ===
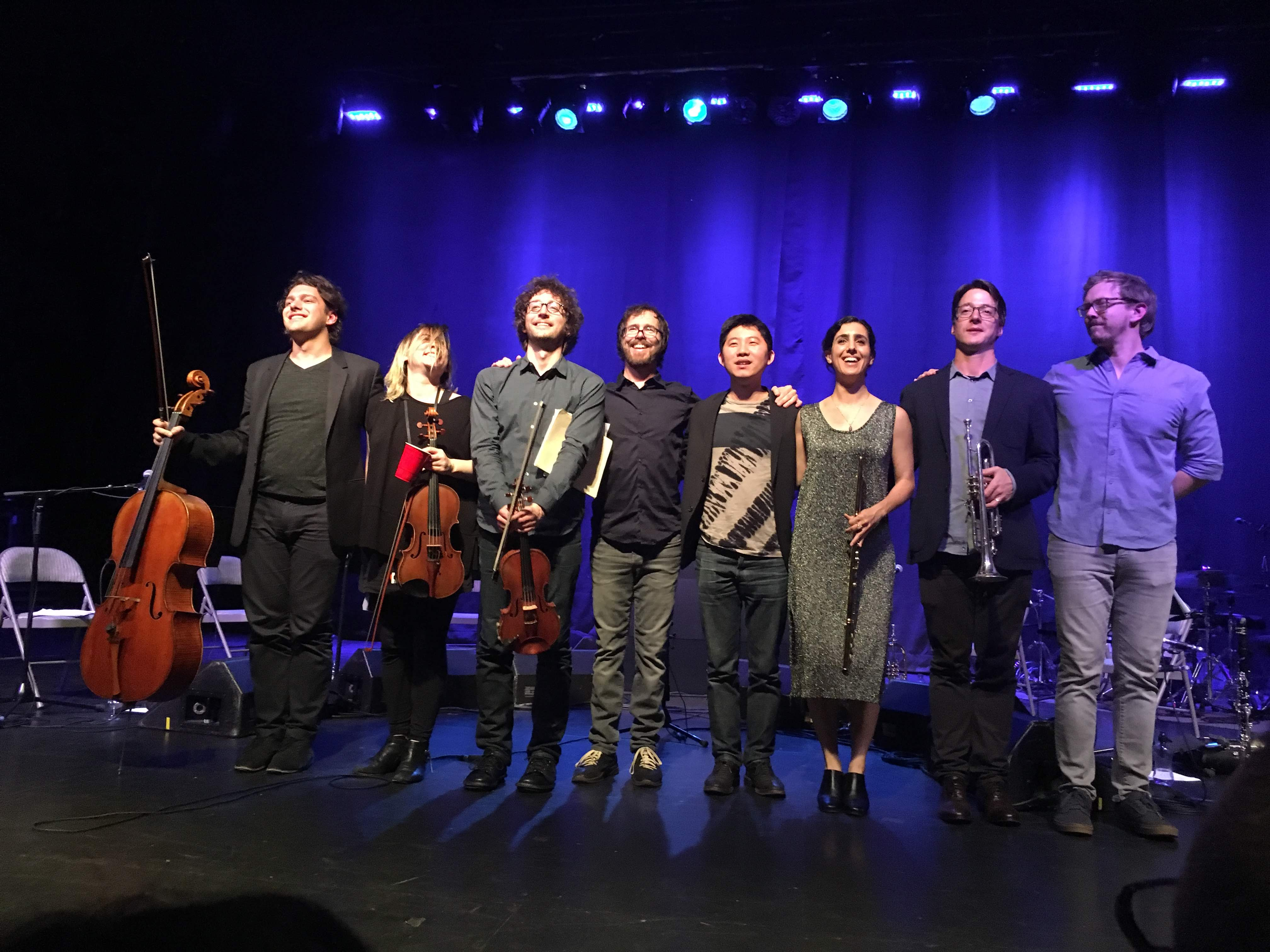
Folds and yMusic on stage in 2016

In March 2014, Folds premiered a commissioned piano concerto he composed with the Nashville Symphony Orchestra. This was followed up in 2015 with So There, an album by Folds and the yMusic Ensemble, released on September 11, 2015. The album includes eight chamber pop songs and the piano concerto performed with the Nashville Symphony.

He guest-starred on a second season episode of the Showtime drama series Billions in April 2017, playing his song "Landed."

On May 11, 2017, Folds was appointed the first Artistic Advisor to the National Symphony Orchestra (NSO) at The Kennedy Center in Washington, D.C. His term was originally through the 2019–2020 season, but held the position until 2025. Folds helps program NSO's Declassified series of concerts, which presents classical and contemporary music in modern, "reimagined" ways. The concerts have featured the orchestra playing with various featured artists, including Folds, Regina Spektor, Sara Bareilles, Jon Batiste, Emily King, and others. With the NSO, Folds collaborated with Mo Willems, contributing original music to a stage adaptation of Goldilocks and the Three Dinosaurs in 2022.

In September 2018, The Washington Post commissioned a single from him called "Mister Peepers." The song depicts former Deputy Attorney General Rod Rosenstein's conflict with Republicans during the Russia investigation, with the name coming from President Trump's nickname for Rosenstein.

In June 2020, he released the song "2020", describing the difficulty of living during the COVID-19 pandemic.

Folds appeared on the podcast Storybound in 2021. In April 2021, he launched his own podcast, Lightning Bugs: Conversations with Ben Folds, speaking with various guests on their artistic processes and the nature of creativity. In March 2022, he announced the podcast was on indefinite hiatus while he continued work on a new album.

In April 2022, Folds contributed the title song to the Peanuts streaming special It's The Small Things, Charlie Brown, released on Apple TV+ for Earth Day. In May 2022, he also made a guest appearance in three episodes of the second season of The Wilds, a streaming drama series for Amazon Prime Video. The episodes featured a new plaintive piano-and-vocal version of the Ben Folds Five hit "Brick", as well as Folds's rendition of the Psychedelic Furs song "The Ghost in You."

=== New albums and Ben Folds Five's reunions (2023–present) ===
On February 15, 2023, Folds announced that his next album, titled What Matters Most, would be released on June 2, 2023. The first single, "Winslow Gardens," was released on the same day as the announcement. Folds spent much of 2023 on an album tour of the United States and Europe, and stated that What Matters Most will likely be his final rock album. Ben Folds Five briefly reunited for a concert in tribute to Caleb Southern on August 28 at the Cat's Cradle in Chapel Hill, performing five songs. Southern was the producer of the band's first three albums and the informal "fourth member" of the band.

During his Paper Airplane Request Tour in mid-2024, Folds announced that he had written and recorded a Christmas album, performing the new song "Me and Maurice" on the tour. He released two singles from the Christmas album, titled Sleigher, on September 25, 2024. The songs were "The Christmas Song" and "We Could Have This," the latter featuring Lindsey Kraft. The album released on October 25.

On February 12, 2025, Folds announced his resignation from his role as the NSO's Artistic Advisor. His departure came after President Donald Trump overhauled the management of the Kennedy Center and named himself the board's chairman. He later said that "the Kennedy Center is for the people. It's not for political gain, but it became partisan. And so that's why I quit, because, if I'm there, I'm a public figure of some kind, [that] is complicit support." On July 4, he released a live album, Ben Folds Live with the National Symphony Orchestra, recorded at the Kennedy Center's Concert Hall on October 25 and 26, 2024. The album features Tall Heights and Regina Spektor.

In July 2026, alongside the announcement of the 30th anniversary special edition of Ben Folds Five, it was also revealed that the band would reunite for their first tour in more than 13 years, though Folds stated the band would not be releasing new music.

== Other work in music ==
=== Work for other musicians ===
In addition to collaborations on his own music, Ben Folds often works with other musicians on their projects. In 1997, Folds recorded an unreleased studio album titled Forever Valentine with Whiskeytown.

"Weird Al" Yankovic parodied Folds's style in the song "Why Does This Always Happen to Me?" on his 2003 album Poodle Hat. According to music critic Nathan Rabin, the song "amplifies the noxious self-absorption of the American character to hilarious extremes" by describing a narrator who, upon hearing about a number of horrible tragedies, only complains about the (minor) inconveniences that affect him. Folds himself plays piano on the track. Yankovic later told The A.V. Club: "Ben and I are old friends at this point, and of course I sought his keyboard work for that song. So he came in and knocked it out."

In 2004, Folds acted as producer, arranger, musician, and backup vocalist to William Shatner's album Has Been. Shatner was also involved in Folds's Fear of Pop project, contributing vocals to a number of songs on the album, most notably the song "In Love."

In August 2008, Folds played piano for friend and Japanese singer-songwriter Angela Aki's song "Black Glasses" on her album Answer.

Folds produced Amanda Palmer of The Dresden Dolls' first solo album, Who Killed Amanda Palmer, which was released September 16, 2008. He also performs on the album.

=== Soundtracks ===
Ben Folds has often contributed both original and previously recorded songs to movies and television shows. Folds contributed a cover of The Beatles' "Golden Slumbers" to the 2001 film I Am Sam. The soundtrack for the 2005 animated film Hoodwinked! featured "Red is Blue", performed by Folds. In May 2006, Folds contributed three original songs to the soundtrack of Over the Hedge, titled "Heist," "Family of Me," and "Still." Included with them was a cover of the Clash song "Lost in the Supermarket" and a recording of "Rockin' the Suburbs" featuring new lyrics written to complement the plot of the film.

Folds's song "Rockin' the Suburbs" was featured on the soundtrack for ABC's sitcom Surviving Suburbia, which aired in August 2009. Folds also wrote the soundtrack for the Netflix original film Handsome, released in May 2017.

=== Tours ===
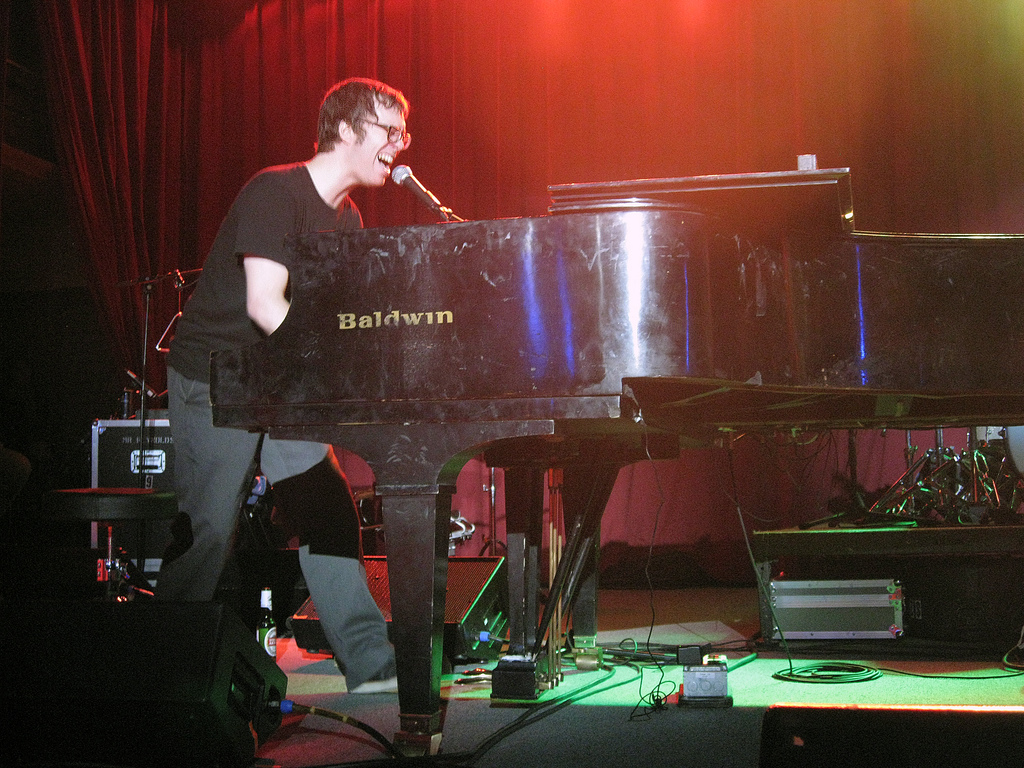
Folds in 2009

After Ben Folds Five split, Folds's first tour with a full band was to support the album Rockin' the Suburbs. He was accompanied by Britt "Snüzz" Uzzell on guitar and electronic keyboard, Millard Powers on bass and keys, and Jim Bogios on drums. Powers and Bogios later went on to join Counting Crows.

On a tour of Australia, Folds joined with the solo artists Ben Kweller and Ben Lee to travel the country as The Bens, at the suggestion of a fan on Kweller's official website. The trio also went on to record a four-track EP together.

In the summer of 2004, Folds co-headlined an American tour with fellow singer-songwriters Rufus Wainwright and Guster. Folds again performed with Wainwright and Lee in the summer of 2005 as part of the "Odd Men Out" tour. In addition, Folds has performed with many other notable musical names, including Weezer and Tori Amos. After seeing the Fray perform with Weezer, Folds asked the band to join him for twelve performances in 2005.

Folds also performed with the West Australian Symphony Orchestra (WASO) in March 2005, the Baltimore Symphony Orchestra (BSO) in November 2005, the Sydney Symphony at the Sydney Opera House, Adelaide Symphony Orchestra West Australian Symphony Orchestra, Melbourne Symphony Orchestra, and the Queensland Orchestra during an Australian tour in 2006. Folds performed with the North Carolina Symphony in March 2010, and the Utah Symphony Orchestra in July 2010. A DVD of Folds playing with the West Australian Symphony Orchestra was released in December 2005.

On May 9, 2007, Folds performed with the Boston Pops Orchestra. The orchestra's performance was marred when a fight broke out between two audience members in the balcony, though Folds had not yet taken the stage.

After his MySpace performance on October 24, 2006, Folds's tour performances began to feature a synthesizer, a red Nord Lead II, which he uses in many of the songs when played live. During his concerts, Folds frequently performs two of his concert traditions: palm-smashing the keys and throwing his stool at the piano.

In March 2007, Folds went on a headlining tour, which opened on March 24 at Assumption College in Worcester, Massachusetts. In the summer of 2007, he performed as the primary opener for John Mayer during his Continuum 38-day summer tour. During this tour, Mayer sometimes joined Folds on the song "Narcolepsy," playing synth. At various concerts throughout the tour, parents of young children going to see Mayer would file complaints about Folds's lyrics.

On March 29, 2008, Folds played the Cage Center Arena at Berry College in Mount Berry, Georgia. During contract negotiations, he was asked by the administration to not play one of his songs because of its explicit lyrics. Folds refused, citing artistic freedom.

On May 9, 2008, Folds played his first completely solo show in years at Western Connecticut State University because his bassist Jared Reynolds was with his wife, who had just given birth to their first son.

Folds made a brief solo tour of Australia in August 2009; at one of his sold-out Sydney Opera House concerts he was joined onstage for several songs by Aimee Mann, who was also touring Australia at the time. At the Palais theatre in Melbourne, Missy Higgins joined him for "You Don't Know Me," a single from Way to Normal that Folds originally sang with Regina Spektor.

In April 2011, Folds collaborated with Amanda Palmer, Neil Gaiman, and Damian Kulash as 8in8 to write, record, and produce eight songs in eight hours, which were then available online within 24 hours, as well as being performed once on its world tour, as part of the ReThink Music conference.

Folds reunited with Ben Folds Five to play the Mountain Jam Music Festival on June 2, 2012. This was the first time the band had performed live together since 2008.

Ben Folds performed at the Kennedy Center in Washington, D.C., for the 2012 Presidential Scholar in the Arts ceremony with several of YoungArts best alumni.

As part of their 2013 "Last Summer on Earth" Tour, Ben Folds Five joined the Barenaked Ladies along with Guster for 30 dates across North America, beginning June 17 at the Verizon Theatre in Dallas, Texas and ending at the 2013 Celebrate Brooklyn festival.

From November 22 to 24, 2013, Folds took part in Performing Arts' American Voices festival hosted by Renée Fleming at the Kennedy Center in Washington, D.C., which featured American jazz, country, Broadway, gospel, popular and classical music. With Sara Bareilles, he conducted a pop/rock master class for aspiring singers. During the concert series he premiered his new song "I'm Not the Man" with the National Symphony Orchestra and sang "Not the Same" with Bareilles.

On January 20, 2014, Folds performed at the El Rey Theatre, Los Angeles, in support of the David Lynch Foundation's celebration of Ringo Starr's "lifetime of peace and love."

From July 2017 to early 2018, Ben Folds went on a tour titled "The Paper Airplane Tour", in which audience members were encouraged to throw paper airplanes with song requests onto the stage halfway through the concert. Folds would then randomly select from these requests from his extensive catalog and perform them solo.

== Other ventures ==
Folds is an avid photographer and cites it as more than just his hobby. His work was featured by National Geographic during the 2010 Tennessee floods.

Folds made a brief guest appearance on a 1996 Space Ghost Coast to Coast episode, Surprise, on Cartoon Network. This marks one of Ben's first non-musical TV appearances.

In 2001, Folds was an inaugural member of the Independent Music Awards' judging panel to support independent artists.

Starting in December 2009, Folds was featured as a judge on NBC's a cappella competition The Sing-Off alongside Nicole Scherzinger and Shawn Stockman. In the season 1 finale, Folds showcased his talents and played the piano background on "Why Can't We Be Friends?," sung by the two finalist groups, the Beelzebubs from Tufts University near Boston and Nota, from San Juan, Puerto Rico. He again returned for the show's second season in December 2010, the third season in September 2011 alongside Stockman and Sara Bareilles and a fourth season with Stockman and Jewel in December 2013. The show featured several performances of songs from Ben's first solo album.

Folds has also taken several acting roles in his career. He made a cameo appearance in the 2013 film We're the Millers playing himself as a piano teacher, although the scene did not make the theatrical cut. In January 2014, Folds had a brief appearance in the TV show Community, in episode "Basic Intergluteal Numismatics" (S5E03) as "Professor Bublitz," a botany teacher who secretly grows marijuana in his office, as well as contributing the song that closes out the episode, "Ass Crack Bandit." This led to him taking a recurring role in seasons 3, 4, and 5 of the FXX comedy You're The Worst playing himself as an alcoholic. In 2022, Folds appeared as himself on 3 episodes of the 2nd season of Prime Video's drama series The Wilds. Folds described his role on the show as playing a "twisted, dream version" of himself.

In May 2017, he began serving as the first artistic advisor to the National Symphony Orchestra (NSO) at the Kennedy Center in Washington, D.C. On February 12, 2025, after President Donald Trump announced that he would fire the current Kennedy Center board of trustees and appoint himself as chairman, Folds announced his resignation from the NSO through Instagram. In July 2026, he testified in front of Congress arguing against the politicization of the Kennedy Center.

In June 2019, Folds launched a podcast titled ArtsVote 2020 with Ben Folds with the stated goal of getting every candidate in the 2020 United States presidential election to have "a one-on-one, 30-minute conversation with Ben Folds about their personal background in the arts and arts education, their observations and previous policy efforts to transform through the arts the communities and states that they represent, and their vision for advancing support for the arts and the charitable sector in the future."

In July 2019, Folds published his first book, a memoir, titled A Dream About Lightning Bugs: A Life of Music and Cheap Lessons. This was followed up in April 2021 when Folds launched a podcast titled Lightning Bugs. In the podcast, Folds discusses creativity with guests from a variety of backgrounds and fields and writes a song with them at the end of every episode. Guests have included frequent collaborators William Shatner and Nick Hornby, as well as other guests such as Mo Willems, Bob Saget, and Jon Batiste.

== Personal life ==
Folds's personal life has inspired several of his songs; the hit single "Brick", co-written with Darren Jessee, was based on the experience of Folds's girlfriend having an abortion while they were in high school. Folds initially refused to discuss the story behind "Brick", thinking it was too serious for a pop song, but he eventually confirmed the inspiration for the song during a show on his Ben Folds Live tour. His telling of the story is included on the "Brick" track on the album.

Folds leased RCA Studio A in Nashville, Tennessee, beginning in 2002 and was pivotal to the preservation of the historic building during its developer controversy in 2014. His efforts, along with others, led to the creation of the Music Industry Coalition.

Folds supports the Port Adelaide Power in the Australian Football League.

Folds supported Bernie Sanders for president in the 2016 presidential election.

Folds primarily resides in Nashville, Tennessee.As of 2016, he lived in Santa Monica, California. He also owned a residence in Hudson, New York, from 2016, until it was sold in December 2020. In March 2020, Folds temporarily resided in Sydney, where he was touring when travel restrictions due to the COVID-19 pandemic prevented him from traveling home. He also has an apartment in Port Willunga, South Australia.

=== Marriages and children ===
Folds has been married and divorced five times. He met his first wife, Anna Goodman, in first grade at Moore Elementary School in Winston-Salem and was married to her from 1987 to 1992. She co-wrote several Ben Folds Five songs, including "Alice Childress", "The Last Polka", "Smoke", "Kate", and "Lullabye". Folds has since described Goodman as his "oldest friend" and the person who originally inspired him to play music.

Folds was then briefly married to Kate Rosen in 1996.

Folds met Frally Hynes, an Australian, in January 1998 and they were married in May 1999 in Adelaide, South Australia, making their home there and later releasing a song about the city titled "Adelaide". Two months after their wedding, Frally gave birth to twins, Louis Francis (July 22, 1999) and Gracie Scott (July 23, 1999), the former inspiring his song "Still Fighting It" and the latter inspiring his song "Gracie". Hynes also sang lead on "Root to This" on Fear of Pop's 1998 album Volume 1. Folds and Hynes divorced in 2006.

Folds married Fleur Stanbrook on November 17, 2007, at The Venetian in Las Vegas. They were based in Nashville. Folds and Stanbrook ended their marriage sometime in 2011. In 2012, Folds said, "As much as I love the idea of being married, it's not for me."

Folds married Emma Sandall, a former Royal Ballet dancer, on January 20, 2017. They divorced on February 27, 2024.

== Awards and recognition ==
Folds received a 2002 Recording Industry Association of America (RIAA) Gold Record award for Ben Folds Five's Whatever and Ever Amen (1998).

He was inducted into the North Carolina Music Hall of Fame in 2011.

October 29, 2015, Folds was initiated as an honorary brother of the men's music fraternity Phi Mu Alpha Sinfonia at the University of Miami.

On August 21, 2018, Folds received a star on the Music City Walk of Fame in Nashville, Tennessee.

== Discography ==
=== Solo ===
- Rockin' the Suburbs (2001)
- Songs for Silverman (2005)
- Way to Normal (2008)
- What Matters Most (2023)
- Sleigher (2024)

=== With Ben Folds Five ===
- Ben Folds Five (1995)
- Whatever and Ever Amen (1997)
- The Unauthorized Biography of Reinhold Messner (1999)
- The Sound of the Life of the Mind (2012)

=== With Nick Hornby ===
- Lonely Avenue (2010)

=== With yMusic ===
- So There (2015)

== Bibliography ==
- A Dream About Lightning Bugs (2019)

== Filmography ==
Year	Title	Role	Notes
2009–2013	The Sing-Off	Himself	Judge; 27 episodes
2013	We're the Millers	Piano teacher	Deleted scene
2014	Community	Professor Bublitz	Episode: "Basic Intergluteal Numismatics"
2016–19	You're the Worst	Ben Folds	3 episodes
2016	Drunk History	Nathan Cherry	Episode: "Shit Shows"
2017	Billions	Ben Folds	Episode: "The Kingmaker"
2022	The Wilds	Himself	3 episodes
