= Angela Aki discography =

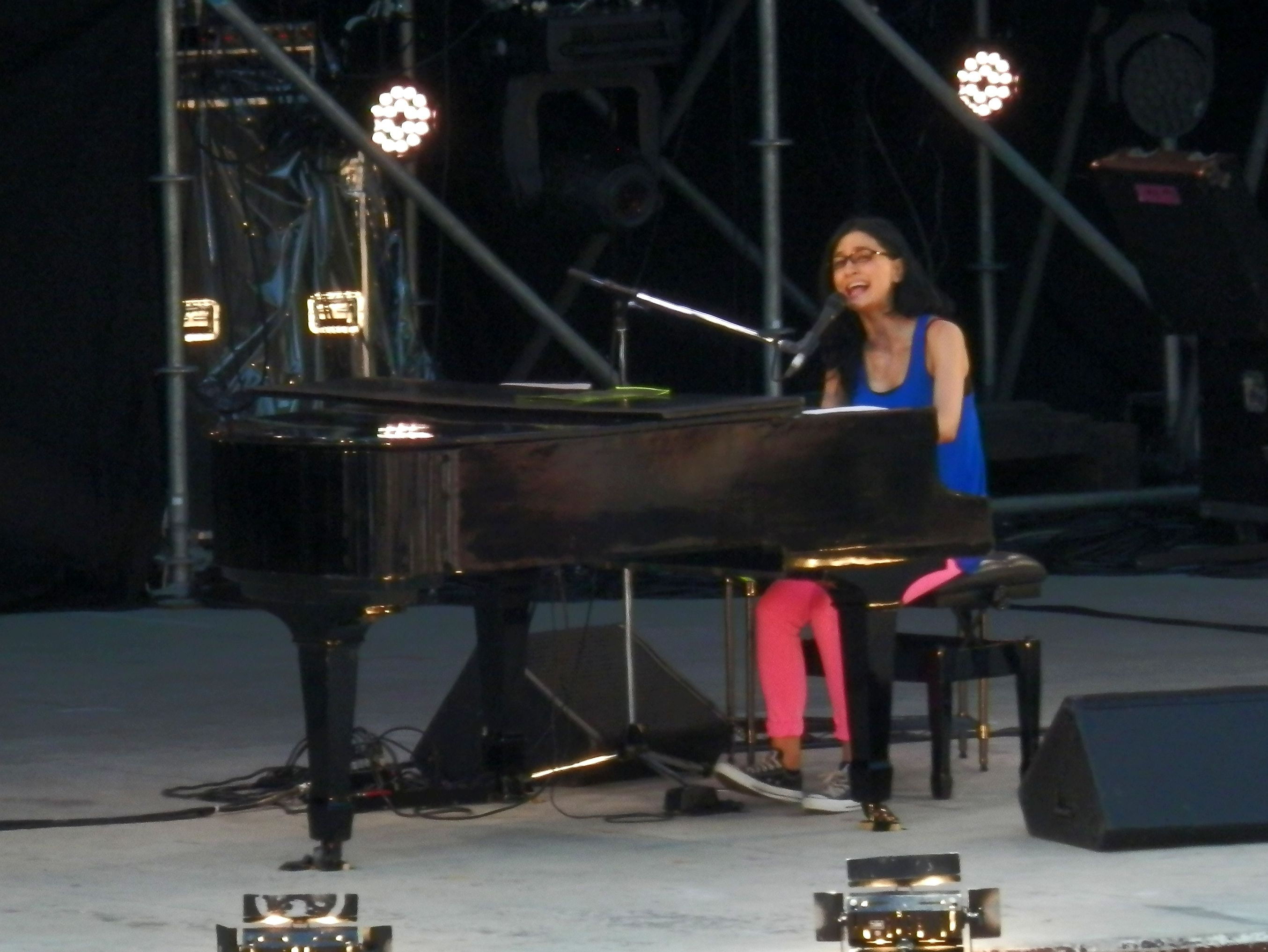
- Aki performing in 2013, in Iwamizawa, Hokkaido.
- Studio albums: 9
- Extended plays: 1
- Compilation albums: 2
- Singles: 13
- Video albums: 5

The discography of Japanese musician Angela Aki consists of nine studio albums, two compilation albums, one extended play, thirteen singles, and five video albums. Her debut album, These Words, was released independently in the United States in early 2000 and was sung entirely in English. After returning to Japan in 2003, Aki followed this with a Japanese-language extended play, One, released under Virgo Music in 2005.

Game musician Nobuo Uematsu offered Aki the chance to sing the theme song for the game Final Fantasy XII after hearing one of her demos in 2003. Aki made her major debut under the Sony Music Japan sub-label Epic Records Japan in 2005 with the single "Home" and released the Final Fantasy XII theme song "Kiss Me Good-Bye" in 2006. Her debut album, Home (2006), was certified double platinum by the Recording Industry Association of Japan.

Her most commercially successful singles were released between 2006 and 2008: "This Love" (2006), which was used as an ending theme song for the anime Blood+, "Sakurairo" (2007), and "Tegami (Haikei Jūgo no Kimi e)" (2008), which was the compulsory song learnt by junior high choirs for the 2008 Nationwide Contest of Music sponsored by NHK. "Sakurairo" has been certified gold twice by the Recording Industry Association of Japan, while "This Love" and "Tegami (Haikei Jūgo no Kimi e)" have been certified multi-platinum. Aki's second and third albums, Today (2007) and Answer (2009), both debuted at number one on the Oricon albums chart. For the fifth anniversary since her major-label debut single "Home", Aki released White (2011), an album composed of a mix of new songs, re-recordings, and covers. In 2012, Aki released Songbook, a collection of Western music covers from her discography that she had performed on her NHK Educational TV television show Angela Aki no Songbook in English.

After releasing her first greatest hits album Tapestry of Songs: The Best of Angela Aki in 2014, Aki took an indefinite hiatus from music in Japan, moving to the United States to enrol in a music school to learn how to write musicals.

== Studio albums ==
List of albums, with selected chart positions
Title	Album details	Peak positions			Sales (JPN) (Note: Sales provided by Oricon database and are rounded to the nearest thousand copies.)	Certifications
Title	Album details	JPN	KOR Overseas (Note: The Gaon Albums Chart was established in 2010.) (Note: Week references for Gaon: Life, White,)	TWN East Asian (Note: The G-Music chart was established in July 2005 and only archives the top 20 releases. The East Asian chart is a sub-chart, so releases may not have charted on the main top 20.) (Note: Position was taken from 2006 week 34 for Home, 2007 week 39 for Today, 2009 week 10 for Answer, 2014 week 18 for Blue.)	Sales (JPN)	Certifications
These Words	Released: January 4, 2000 (US); Label: independently released; Formats: CD	—	—	—		
Home	Released: June 14, 2006 (JPN); Label: Epic Records Japan; Formats: CD, CD/DVD, digital download	2	—	6	553,000	RIAJ: 2× Platinum
Today	Released: September 19, 2007 (JPN); Label: Epic; Formats: CD, CD/DVD, digital download	1	—	9	202,000	RIAJ: Platinum
Answer	Released: February 25, 2009 (JPN); Label: Epic; Formats: CD, CD/DVD, digital download	1	—	10	171,000	RIAJ: Gold
Life	Released: September 8, 2010 (JPN); Label: Epic; Formats: CD, CD/DVD, digital download	5	37	—	54,000	
White	Released: September 28, 2011 (JPN); Label: Epic; Formats: CD, CD/DVD, digital download	4	37	—	33,000	
Blue	Released: July 18, 2012 (JPN); Label: Epic; Formats: CD, CD/DVD, digital download	14	—	10	19,000	
Angela Aki Sings Kono Sekai no Katasumi ni (アンジェラ・アキ sings 『この世界の片隅に』)	Released: April 24, 2024 (JPN); Label: Sony; Formats: CD, digital download	17	—	—	1,721	
Shadow Work	Released: February 11, 2026; Label: Sony; Formats: CD, digital download	31	—	—	1,301	
"—" denotes items which did not chart, were not released in the listed regions, or released before the creation of the Gaon Albums Chart.

== Compilation albums ==
List of albums, with selected chart positions
Title	Album details	Peak positions	Sales (JPN)	Certifications
Title	Album details	JPN	Sales (JPN)	Certifications
Songbook	Cover re-recording compilation; Released: January 11, 2012 (JPN); Label: Epic; Formats: CD, CD/DVD, digital download	11	13,000	
Tapestry of Songs: The Best of Angela Aki	Released: March 5, 2014 (JPN); Label: Epic; Formats: CD, 2CD/DVD, digital download	3	67,000	RIAJ: Gold (phy.)

== Extended play ==
List of extended plays, with selected chart positions
Title	Album details	Peak positions	Sales (JPN)
Title	Album details	JPN	Sales (JPN)
One	Released: June 20, 2005 (JPN); Label: Virgo Music; Formats: CD, digital download	88	9,000

== Singles ==
List of singles, with selected chart positions
Title	Year	Peak chart positions		Sales (JPN)	Certifications	Album
Title	Year	Oricon Singles Charts	Billboard Japan Hot 100 (Note: The Japan Hot 100 was established in February 2008.) (Note: Sources for chart positions are as follows: "Tegami", "Ai no Kisetsu", "Kagayaku Hito", "Hajimari no Ballad", "Kokuhaku", "Yume no Owari, Koi no Hajimari".)	Sales (JPN)	Certifications	Album
"Home"	2005	38	—	15,000		Home
"Kokoro no Senshi"	2006	13	—	37,000		Home
"Kiss Me Good-Bye"	2006	6	—	69,000	RIAJ (physical): Gold	Home
"This Love"	2006	6	—	63,000	RIAJ (ringtone): 2× Platinum; RIAJ (cellphone): Platinum; RIAJ (physical): Gold	Home
"Sakurairo"	2007	8	72 (Note: Charted in 2008.)	106,000	RIAJ (cellphone): Gold; RIAJ (physical): Gold	Today
"Kodoku no Kakera" (孤独のカケラ; "Fragments of Solitude")	2007	9	—	32,000		Today
"Tashika ni"	2007	15	—	15,000		Today
"Again"	2007	—	—			Today
"Tegami (Haikei Jūgo no Kimi e)"	2008	3	1	239,000	RIAJ (digital): Million; RIAJ (physical): Platinum	Answer
"Ai no Kisetsu"	2009	7	6	17,000		Life
"Kagayaku Hito"	2010	6	6	20,000		Life
"Hajimari no Ballad"	2011	17	12	17,000		White
"I Have a Dream"	2011	17	—	17,000		White
"Kokuhaku"	2012	40	17	4,000		Blue
"Yume no Owari, Ai no Hajimari" (夢の終わり 愛の始まり; "The End of a Dream, the Start of Love")	2013	30	14	3,000		Tapestry of Songs
"Kono Sekai no Achikochi ni" (この世界のあちこちに; "Here and There in This World")	2024	—	TBA			Angela Aki sings Kono Sekai no Katasumi ni
"—" denotes items which were released before the creation of the Billboard Japan Hot 100 in 2008.

=== Promotional singles ===
Title	Year	Peak chart positions	Album
Title	Year	Billboard Japan Hot 100 (Note: Sources for chart positions are as follows: "Knockin' on Heaven's Door", "Answer", "Every Woman's Song", "Tsugaru Kaikyō Fuyugeshiki".)	Album
"Rain"	2005	—	One
"On & On"	2006	—	Today
"Power of Music"	2006	—	"Sakurairo" (single)
"Knockin' on Heaven's Door"	2009	61	Answer
"Answer"	2009	93	Answer
"Every Woman's Song" (with Janis Ian)	2010	53	Life
"Tsugaru Kaikyō Fuyugeshiki"	2011	93	White
"—" denotes items which were released before the creation of the Billboard Japan Hot 100 in 2008.

== Video albums ==
List of media, with selected chart positions
Title	Album details	Peak positions	
Title	Album details	JPN DVD	JPN Blu-ray
Angela Aki My Keys 2006 in Budokan	Released: March 28, 2007 (JPN); Label: Epic; Formats: DVD, Blu-ray	13	—
Angela Aki Concert Tour 2007-2008 Today	Released: October 1, 2008 (JPN); Label: Epic; Formats: DVD, Blu-ray	14	—
Piano Hikigatari Live Naniwa no My Keys 2008 in Osakajō Hall & My Keys 2008 in Budokan	Released: September 16, 2009 (JPN); Label: Epic; Formats: DVD, Blu-ray	23	—
Angela Aki Concert Tour 2009 Answer Documentary & Live	Released: September 22, 2010 (JPN); Label: Epic; Formats: DVD, Blu-ray	53	—
Home Sweet Home: 5 Years Best Hit & All Request in Budokan + Awa no My Keys: Piano Hikigatari in Asty Tokushima	Released: July 18, 2012 (JPN); Label: Epic; Formats: DVD, Blu-ray	65	82
Angela Aki Concert Tour 2014 Tapestry of Songs: The Best of Angela Aki in Budokan 0804	Released: December 17, 2014 (JPN); Label: Epic; Formats: DVD, Blu-ray	72	52

== Songwriting and production ==
Title	Artist	Album	Release date
Sing Sing Sing	Janis Ian	Sing Sing Sing (Single)	2016
Waltz-steps	machina	Color Me	2016
Ashita wo Kudasai	Masayuki Suzuki	dolce	2016
赤いライフジャケット (Red Life Jacket)	Dr. Capital	You Are Love	2017
甘いボサノバ (Sweet Bossa Nova)	Dr. Capital	You Are Love	2017
母と娘の10,000日〜未来の扉〜 (10,000 Days of Mother and Daughter ~A Door to the Future~)	May J feat. Aki Yashiro	Futuristic	2017
初恋のワルツ (First Love Waltz)	Anna	TBD	2018
Anata ni Totte	Saori Yuki	BEGINNING ~Anata ni Totte~	2019
Polaris	Masayuki Suzuki	ALL TIME ROCK 'N' ROLL	2020
カナリアの歌 (Canary Song)	Emiko Suzuki	5 senses	2022
Breath	Nozomi Fuuto	笑顔の場所 (A Place of Smiles)	2024
名前 (Name)	Sakurako Ohara	TBD	2025

== Other appearances ==
List of non-studio album or guest appearances that feature Angela Aki
Title	Year	Album
"Oshinagaki (Konishi no Osobayasan)" (おしながき ～コニシのおそばやさん～; "Menu (Konishi's Soba Shop)") (Yasuharu Konishi featuring Angela Aki)	2003	Soba-a-mbient! Music for Your Favorite Soba Shop
"Fuyu no Hi no W." (冬の日のW.; "W. on a Winter Day") (Mimori Yusa featuring Angela Aki)	2006	Kyūka Goya
"Eyes on Me (Live)"	2006	Voices: Music from Final Fantasy (Note: Live DVD concert release.)
"Kiss Me Good-Bye (Live)"	2006	Voices: Music from Final Fantasy
"Meguriuta" (めぐり唄; "Return Song") (Kenta Ebara with Angela Aki)	2008	Meguriuta
"Black Glasses" (Ben Folds with Angela Aki)	2009	Ben Folds File
"Kiss Me Good-Bye (Live)" (Angela Aki with Taro Hakase)	2011	Jounetsu Tairiku Live Best
