= Tapestry of Songs: The Best of Angela Aki =

- Regular edition cover

Compilation album by Angela Aki
- Released: March 5, 2014
- Recorded: 2005–2013
- Genre: Pop
- Length: 74:08; 151:46
- Language: Japanese, English
- Label: Epic Records Japan

Angela Aki chronology
Blue (2012)	Tapestry of Songs: The Best of Angela Aki (2014)

Singles from Tapestry of Songs
- 1. "Yume no Owari, Ai no Hajimari" Released: July 3, 2013

Tapestry of Songs: The Best of Angela Aki is a greatest hits album by Japanese singer-songwriter Angela Aki, released on March 5, 2014. The album compiles Aki's singles released from 2005, until her final single "Yume no Owari, Ai no Hajimari" in 2013 before her hiatus. The album was also released in a special two disc version, featuring additional songs Aki considered her favorites.

== Background and development ==
In July 2012, Aki released her sixth Japanese original album, Blue, led by the single "Kokuhaku", a song that was used as the ending theme song for the anime Space Brothers. A year later, Aki released the single "Yume no Owari, Ai no Hajimari", a collaboration with producer Seiji Kameda, featuring an entirely computer generated arrangement.

After releasing Life in 2010, Aki felt as if she were in a slump, and was not inspired to write music. In January 2011, Aki discovered she had an ectopic pregnancy, after taking ill. After these things, soon followed by the tragedy of the 2011 Tōhoku earthquake and tsunami, Aki contacted a close friend and author, to collaborate on a musical project. She had met him during her unsigned years in Japan (2003-2004), at the same time he was having difficulties becoming published. Eventually the book became a best-seller, which he one day hoped to turn into a musical. Aki eventually decided she would enrol in a music school in the United States in order to study how to write Broadway musicals. She decided she could not continue her career in Japan, as she did not want to split her efforts and underperform. At 37 years of age, Aki also felt it was her last chance to realise such a project before it was too late.

Aki plans to look for a house immediately after her final Japanese concert in August 2014 for her family to live in, before her school term begins in Autumn 2014.

== Production ==
The project was first unveiled on November 30, 2011. Disc 1 features all of Aki's singles, including her digital single "Again" (2007) and both A-sides of "Hajimari no Ballad/I Have a Dream" (2011). The limited edition featured a bonus CD, featuring Aki's favorite songs not already found on the first disc. She compiled this CD as she believed the songs released as singles were not fully representative of her work, singling out "Uchū" and "Moral no Sōshiki" as songs with "dark world views" which were not singles. The limited edition also contained a DVD containing most of Aki's music videos. It excludes "Knockin' on Heaven's Door" (2009), and her three videos from her independent period, "Aisuru Mono", "Rain" and "We're All Alone" (2005).

The title is a line from Aki's collaboration song with Janis Ian, "Every Woman's Song".

The limited edition cover features a clear-slip over top of a picture of Aki without glasses. The clear-slip features Aki's glasses digitally added, so that the owner can remove her glasses at will.

== Promotion and release ==
To promote the release, Aki recorded a new music video for her song "Tegami (Haikei Jūgo no Kimi e)", with director Toshiyuki Suzuki. On March 22, NHK Educational TV aired a documentary, Haikei Nijū no Kimi e: Angela Aki to Chūgakusei-tachi, Saikai Soshite Mirai e (拝啓 二十歳の君へ ～アンジェラ・アキと中学生たち 再会そして未来へ～; "To you at 20: Angela Aki and middle schoolers, meeting again and onto the future"). It featured Aki travelling to the Gotō Islands, to meet the people she had first met in the 2008 documentary Haikei Jūgo no Kimi e: Angela Aki to Chūgakusei-tachi a second time. On April 11, Aki performed "Tegami (Haikei Jūgo no Kimi e)" at Music Station.

Aki embarked on Angela Aki Concert Tour 2014 Tapestry of Songs: The Best of Angela Aki, a 44 date farewell tour to support the album. The tour began in Chiba on April 5, and will end on August 4 at the Nippon Budokan in Tokyo. She managed to tour 37 of the 47 Prefectures of Japan: stopping three times in Hokkaido (Asahikawa, Sapporo and Nakashibetsu), twice in Hyōgo (Tatsuno and Kobe), twice in Gifu (Tajimi and Takayama, twice in Aichi (Kariya and Nagoya) and three times in Osaka.

== Track listing ==
All tracks are written by Angela Aki.

No.	Title	Arranger	Length
1.	"Home"	Motoki Matsuoka, A. Aki, Yoshinori Abe	4:56
2.	"Kokoro no Senshi"	M. Matsuoka, A. Aki, Y. Abe, Shin Kono	5:10
3.	"Kiss Me Good-Bye"	M. Matsuoka, A. Aki, Y. Abe, S. Kono	5:13
4.	"This Love"	M. Matsuoka, A. Aki, Y. Abe, S. Kono	4:44
5.	"Sakurairo"	Seiji Kameda	5:18
6.	"Kodoku no Kakera" (孤独のカケラ "Fragments of Solitude")	S. Kameda	5:21
7.	"Tashika ni"	S. Kameda	4:58
8.	"Again"	S. Kōno, A. Aki	4:31
9.	"Tegami (Haikei Jūgo no Kimi e)"	A. Aki	5:09
10.	"Ai no Kisetsu"	A. Aki, Y. Abe	5:04
11.	"Kagayaku Hito"	A. Aki	5:20
12.	"Hajimari no Ballad"	A. Aki	4:54
13.	"I Have a Dream"	A. Aki	4:50
14.	"Kokuhaku"	A. Aki, Y. Abe, Eiji Q. Makino	4:21
15.	"Yume no Owari, Ai no Hajimari" (夢の終わり 愛の始まり "The End of a Dream, the Start of Love")	S. Kameda	4:19
Total length:			74:08

Angela Personal Best Selection (disc 2)
No.	Title	Lyrics	Music	Arranger	Length
1.	"Rain"	A. Aki	A. Aki	A. Aki	3:54
2.	"Uchū" (宇宙 "Space")	A. Aki	A. Aki	M. Matsuoka, A. Aki, Y. Abe	4:50
3.	"Music"	A. Aki	A. Aki	M. Matsuoka, A. Aki, Y. Abe	4:51
4.	"Today"	A. Aki	A. Aki	A. Aki	4:45
5.	"Moral no Sōshiki" (モラルの葬式 "Funeral of Morals")	A. Aki	A. Aki	A. Aki, Y. Abe, Hoppy Kamiyama	5:44
6.	"One Melody"	A. Aki	A. Aki	A. Aki	5:33
7.	"Ai no Uta" (愛のうた "Love Song")	A. Aki	A. Aki	A. Aki, H. Kamiyama	6:00
8.	"Answer"	A. Aki	A. Aki	A. Aki, E. Makino	4:34
9.	"Dahlia" (ダリア Daria)	A. Aki	A. Aki	A. Aki, H. Kamiyama	7:40
10.	"Final Destination"	A. Aki	A. Aki	A. Aki	4:40
11.	"Life"	A. Aki	A. Aki, S. Kōno	A. Aki, S. Kōno	4:38
12.	"Every Woman's Song" (featuring Janis Ian)	A. Aki, J. Ian	A. Aki, J. Ian	A. Aki	4:45
13.	"Ai to Bansōkō" (愛と絆創膏 "Love and a Bandage")	A. Aki	A. Aki	A. Aki, Ryosuke "Dr.R" Sakai, S. Kōno	4:50
14.	"Cry"	A. Aki	A. Aki	A. Aki	5:12
15.	"One Family"	A. Aki	A. Aki	A. Aki	5:40
Total length:					77:38

DVD
No.	Title	Director	Length
1.	"Home"	Tomoo Noda	4:56
2.	"Kokoro no Senshi"	T. Noda	5:10
3.	"Kiss Me Good-Bye"	Ukon Uemura	5:13
4.	"This Love"	Takamasa Takimoto	4:44
5.	"Sakurairo"	AT	5:18
6.	"Kodoku no Kakera"	Takaaki Makino	5:21
7.	"Tashika ni"	Yoshiya Okoyama	4:58
8.	"Again"	T. Takimoto	4:31
9.	"Tegami (Haikei Jūgo no Kimi e)"	Masashi Muto	5:09
10.	"Ai no Kisetsu"	M. Muto	5:04
11.	"Kagayaku Hito"	M. Muto	5:20
12.	"Hajimari no Ballad"	M. Muto	4:54
13.	"Tsugaru Kaikyō Fuyugeshiki"	Hiroshi Usui	3:50
14.	"Kokuhaku"	H. Usui	4:21
15.	"Yume no Owari, Ai no Hajimari"	Satoshi Yamamoto	4:19
16.	"Tegami (Haikei Jūgo no Kimi e) 2014"	Toshiyuki Suzuki	5:09
17.	"Performance History 2005-2014"

== Charts ==
Chart (2014)	Peak position
Japan Oricon weekly singles	3
Japan Oricon monthly albums	11
Japan Oricon yearly albums	72

=== Sales ===
Chart	Amount
Oricon physical sales	67,000

== Release history ==
Region	Date	Format	Distributing Label	Catalogue codes
Japan	March 5, 2014	CD, 2 Blu-spec CD/DVD	Sony	ESCL-4170, ESCL-3001
Taiwan	March 7, 2014	CD	Sony	88843052642
Hong Kong	March 12, 2014	CD	Sony	88843052642
Japan	March 22, 2014	Rental CD	Sony	ESCL-4170
