= Life (Angela Aki album) =

Studio album by Angela Aki
- Released: September 08, 2010
- Genre: J-Pop
- Length: 50:00

Angela Aki chronology
Answer (2009)	Life (2010)	White (2011)

Singles from Life
- 1. "Ai no Kisetsu" Released: September 16, 2009; 2. "Kagayaku Hito" Released: April 14, 2010

Life is the fourth full studio album by Angela Aki released on September 8, 2010.

== Singles ==
- Ai no Kisetsu (愛の季節; Seasons of Love) is the first single from the album. Released on September 16, 2009, it was used as a theme song for NHK drama "Tsubasa".
- Kagayaku Hito (輝く人; Shining One) is the second single, released on April 10, 2010. For the first time Aki plays the guitar in a song. he title track was used as a theme song for NHK drama "Kokoro no Idenshi".

=== Other Songs ===
- Life was used as the CM for Nissay campaign "Mihai Support".
- Every Woman's song was released to promote the album. It reached the second position on the USEN J-Pop Chart; it's the first song with English lyrics to make it into the top three.

== Track listing ==
CD
No.	Title	Length
1.	"Ai no Kisetsu"	5:04
2.	"Kagayaku Hito (輝く人; Shining One)"	5:21
3.	"Every Woman’s Song"	4:45
4.	"Sign (サイン)"	3:44
5.	"Remember Me"	4:38
6.	"Unbreakable"	4:04
7.	"What Are The Roses For?"	3:37
8.	"Ai to Bansoukou (愛と絆創膏; Love and Plaster)"	4:50
9.	"Mad Scientist"	4:15
10.	"The Truth Is Like A Lie"	4:53
11.	"Bop Bop Bop (Colors Of Your Soul)"	3:33
12.	"Haha naru Daichi (母なる大地; Mother Earth)"	6:41
13.	"Life"	4:38

Hong Kong Bonus Track
No.	Title	Length
14.	"Tegami (Haikei Jūgo no Kimi e) (手紙 ~拝啓 十五の君へ~; Letter (To Your 15-Year-Old Self))" (graduate choral version)

DVD
No.	Title	Length
1.	"Home" ((Music Video))
2.	"Kokoro no Senshi (心の戦士; Heart of the Warrior)" ((Music Video))
3.	"Kiss Me Good-Bye" ((Music Video))
4.	"This Love" ((Music Video))
5.	"Sakurairo (サクラ色; Sakura Color)" ((Music Video))
6.	"Kodoku no Kakera (孤独のカケラ; Fragments of Loneliness)" ((Music Video))
7.	"Tashika ni (たしかに; Surely)" ((Music Video))
8.	"Again" ((Music Video))
9.	"Tegami (Haikei Jūgo no Kimi e) (手紙 ~拝啓 十五の君へ~; Letter (To Your 15-Year-Old Self))" ((Music Video))
10.	"Ai no Kisetsu (愛の季節; Seasons of Love)" ((Music Video))
11.	"Kagayaku Hito (輝く人; Shining One)" ((Music Video))

== Charts ==
Chart	Peak Position
Japan (Oricon Daily Charts)	5
Japan (Oricon Weekly Charts)	5
Japan (Oricon Monthly Charts)	12

== Release history ==
Region	Date	Format	Distributing label	Catalogue codes
Japan	September 8, 2010	CD, CD/DVD, digital download	Sony	ESCL-3520, ESCL-3518~9
South Korea	September 9, 2010	CD, digital download	Sony	2398026
Taiwan	September 10, 2010	CD	Sony	88697767772
Hong Kong	September 10, 2010	CD (Asian Special Edition)	Sony	88697795402
Taiwan	September 17, 2010	CD (Asian Special Edition)	Sony	88697795402
Singapore	September 24, 2012	CD (Asian Special Edition)	Sony	88697795402
Japan	September 25, 2010	Rental CD	Sony	ESCL-3520
