= Sanyo W51SA =

Japanese mobile phone

W51SA
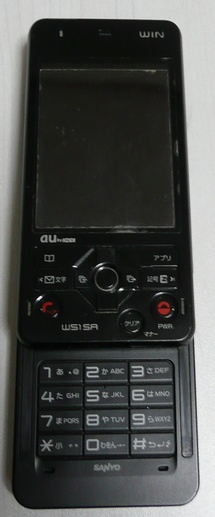
- W51SA (Modern Black)
- Brand: au
- Manufacturer: Sanyo
- First released: February 9, 2007
- Compatible networks: CDMA2000 1xMC (800 MHz / 2 GHz), CDMA2000 1xEV-DO Rel.0 (3.5G CDMA 1X WIN)
- Form factor: Slider
- Colors: Grass Green; Ivory White; Modern Black
- Dimensions: 105 mm (4.1 in) H 51 mm (2.0 in) W 21 mm (0.83 in) D
- Weight: 146 g (5.1 oz)
- Operating system: REX OS + KCP
- CPU: Qualcomm MSM6550 @ 225 MHz
- Storage: 1 GB internal
- Removable storage: microSD
- Charging: 120 minutes
- Rear camera: 1.99 MP CMOS, Autofocus
- Display: 2.6 in (66 mm) IPS LCD, QVGA (240 × 320 pixels), 260K colors

The W51SA is a CDMA 1X WIN compatible mobile phone developed for the Japanese market by Sanyo (Osaka, currently Panasonic Corporation) for the au brand operated by KDDI and Okinawa Cellular Telephone.

Released on February 9, 2007, it is the first slider form factor model from Sanyo since the long-selling W31SA/SA II. Continuing from the W43SA, it includes 1Seg TV tuner functionality and adds new support for LISMO! Video Clip, Open App Player, EZ FeliCa (Osaifu-Keitai, a first for a Sanyo device), and au Mobile Coupon. It also features the FM transmitter that was well received on the W32SA. The internal data folder capacity is 1 GB (equivalent to the W52T), and when used together with a microSD card, total usable memory can reach up to approximately 3 GB.
