= Hajimari no Ballad/I Have a Dream =

Single by Angela Aki

from the album White
- Released: June 8, 2011 (Japan)
- Genre: J-pop
- Length: 14:04
- Label: Sony Music Japan
- Songwriter: Angela Aki (Hajimari no Ballad/I Have a Dream)

Angela Aki singles chronology
"Kagayaku Hito" (2010)	"Hajimari no Ballad/I Have a Dream" (2011)	"Kokuhaku" (2012)

"Hajimari no Ballad (始まりのバラード, Ballad of Beginning)" is the eleventh single by Japanese singer Angela Aki, released on June 8, 2011.

== Track listing ==
All tracks are written by Angela Aki, except Creep.

CD
No.	Title	Arranger(s)	Length
1.	"Hajimari no Ballad (始まりのバラード, Ballad of Beginning)"	Angela Aki
2.	"I Have a Dream"	Angela Aki
3.	"CREEP"	Radiohead, Albert Hammond and Mike Hazlewood, Japanese lyrics by Angela Aki

All tracks are written by Angela Aki.

DVD
No.	Title	Length
1.	"Awa no MY KEYS Supesharu Raibu Mūbī (阿波のMY KEYS スペシャル・ライブ・ムービー, My Keys to Awa Special Concert Movie)"
