= Music of Final Fantasy XII =

Music from the video game Final Fantasy XII

The music of the video game Final Fantasy XII was composed primarily by Hitoshi Sakimoto. Additional music was provided by Masaharu Iwata and Hayato Matsuo, who also orchestrated the opening and ending themes. Former regular series composer Nobuo Uematsu's only work for this game was "Kiss Me Good-Bye", the theme song sung by Angela Aki. The Final Fantasy XII Original Soundtrack was released on four Compact Discs in 2006 by Aniplex. A sampling of tracks from the soundtrack was released as an album entitled Selections from Final Fantasy XII Original Soundtrack, and was released in 2006 by Tofu Records. Additionally, a promotional digital album titled The Best of Final Fantasy XII was released on the Japanese localization of iTunes for download only in 2006. "Kiss Me Good-Bye" was released by Epic Records as a single in 2006, and Symphonic Poem "Hope", the complete music from the game's end credits, was released by Hats Unlimited the same year. An abridged version of the latter piece, which originally accompanied a promotional video for the game, was included in the official soundtrack album. An album of piano arrangements, titled Piano Collections Final Fantasy XII, was released by Square Enix in 2012.

The soundtrack received mixed reviews from critics; while several felt that it was an excellent album, others disagreed, finding it to be a good soundtrack but lacking in substance. Common complaints about the album were the large number of filler tracks, which seemed to be uninspired and hurt the soundtrack as a whole. However, several reviewers commented on "Kiss Me Good-bye", finding it to be one of the soundtrack's strongest areas. The singles for the soundtrack were very well received by critics, who found them to be very enjoyable but short in duration, and the piano album was considered by reviewers to be one of the best in the series. The game's soundtrack was nominated for a British Academy of Film and Television Arts award for Best Original Score.

== Creation and influence ==
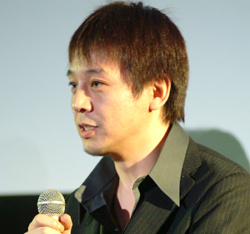
Hitoshi Sakimoto was the lead composer of Final Fantasy XII.

Hitoshi Sakimoto composed most of the game's soundtrack; Nobuo Uematsu, following his departure from Square Enix in 2004, only contributed the theme song, "Kiss Me Good-Bye", sung by Angela Aki. Uematsu noted that Aki's style of playing the keyboard while singing reminded him of his childhood idol, Elton John, which was one of the reasons he chose her. Aki was approached for the role three years before the release of the game. She based her words for the song on "a scene of a new journey after good-bye", which was the sense she had gotten from Uematsu's melody, and was encouraged by Uematsu not to limit herself in her lyrics to what she thought the producers wanted. Sakimoto was brought in to compose the soundtrack to the game by Yasumi Matsuno, the producer of the game, five months before the game was officially announced. Sakimoto experienced difficulty following in Uematsu's footsteps, but he decided to create a unique soundtrack in his own way, although he cites Uematsu as his biggest musical influence.

Sakimoto did not meet with Uematsu for direction on creating the soundtrack and tried to avoid copying Uematsu's style from previous Final Fantasy soundtracks. However, he did attempt to ensure that his style would mesh with Uematsu's "Kiss Me Good-Bye" and the overall vision of the series. The soundtrack also includes pieces composed by Uematsu for previous Final Fantasy games, with new arrangements by Sakimoto. These tracks include "Final Fantasy ~FFXII Version~", "Victory Fanfare ~FFXII Version~", "Chocobo FFXII Arrange Ver. 1", "Chocobo ~FFXII Version~", and "Clash on the Big Bridge ~FFXII Version~". Of these, all but "Clash on the Big Bridge" are recurring pieces used in almost every Final Fantasy game. "Clash on the Big Bridge" plays during the battle with Gilgamesh, as it did in Final Fantasy V. Sakimoto created the music for the game based on the atmosphere of the game and the emotional changes of the characters, rather than the story, so that the music would not be affected by changes in the development of the game. Sakimoto stated in an interview included in a bonus disc of the collector's edition of the game that his favorite pieces from the soundtrack are the "world" themes in the outdoor areas, and that his overall favorite is "The Cerobi Steppe".

== Soundtrack ==
Final Fantasy XII Original Soundtrack

Studio album by Hitoshi Sakimoto
- Released: May 31, 2006
- Genre: Orchestra, classical, electronic, video game soundtrack
- Length: Disk 1: 73:15; Disk 2: 73:18; Disk 3: 73:19; Disk 4: 73:25
- Label: Aniplex
- Producer: Hitoshi Sakimoto

Final Fantasy XII Original Soundtrack is the soundtrack album of Final Fantasy XII, containing musical tracks from the game, and was composed and produced by Hitoshi Sakimoto. Additional music was provided by Masaharu Iwata and Hayato Matsuo, who also orchestrated the opening and ending themes. The soundtrack spans four discs and 100 tracks, covering a duration of 4:54:34. It was released on May 31, 2006 in Japan by Aniplex, bearing the catalog numbers SVWC-7351~4. The limited edition of the soundtrack included a 28-page booklet featuring artwork for the game and providing information about the soundtrack.

An album entitled Selections from Final Fantasy XII Original Soundtrack was released on October 31, 2006 by Tofu Records containing 31 tracks from the full Final Fantasy XII soundtrack. The tracks were the same versions as on the full soundtrack, although some tracks that repeated were cut shorter. The album covers a duration of 73:23 and has a catalog number of TOF-033. Additionally, a promotional digital album titled The Best of Final Fantasy XII was released on the Japanese localization of iTunes for download only on March 15 the same year. The album contains 11 tracks handpicked by Hitoshi Sakimoto, including versions of "Theme of Final Fantasy XII" and "Chocobo FFXII Arrange Ver. 1" that were ultimately not used in the game.

The game's soundtrack was nominated for a British Academy of Film and Television Arts award for Best Original Score. Final Fantasy XII Original Soundtrack has sold 31,000 copies as of January 2010. It reached #7 on the Japanese Oricon charts, and stayed on the charts for six weeks. The album received mixed reviews from critics. Jared's review from Square Enix Music Online cited that the soundtrack "utilizes ambiance, power, intensity and beauty" and termed the album to be "amazing", though he felt that the lack of melody "hurts this soundtrack" and that some of the tracks were "bare of inspiration". Meghan Sullivan of IGN thought that the composer was "trying too hard to evoke emotion" and that many of the tracks were "over-the-top and bombastic", though she did feel that there were certain tracks that "manage[d] to be stirring". She also stated that Uematsu's only work for the soundtrack, "Kiss Me Good-bye", is a "strong end to a surprisingly trite collection". Greg Kasavin of GameSpot, on the other hand, felt that it was a "beautifully composed soundtrack" that sounded "fantastic". Patrick Gann of RPGFan found it to be "a great work", but "somewhat lacking in substance", concluding that he had "a lot of mixed feelings about it", while Ben Schweitzer of RPGFan disagreed, enjoying the soundtrack and finding it to be an "excellent" album, and "better than [he] could have expected".

Track list

Disc 1
No.	Title	Japanese title	Length
1.	"Loop Demo"	ループデモ Rūpu Demo	1:36
2.	"FINAL FANTASY ~FFXII Version~"	FINAL FANTASY ~FFXIIバージョン~ FINAL FANTASY ~FFXII Bājon~	1:17
3.	"Opening Movie (Theme of FINAL FANTASY XII)"	オープニング・ムービー (FINAL FANTASY XIIのテーマ) Ōpuningu Mūbī (FINAL FANTASY XII no Tēma)	6:57
4.	"Infiltration"	潜入 Sennyū	3:09
5.	"Boss Battle"	ボス戦 Bosusen	3:24
6.	"Auditory Hallucination"	幻聴 Genchō	3:13
7.	"Secret Practice"	秘密の練習 Himitsu no renshū	2:09
8.	"A Small Happiness"	小さな幸せ Chīsa na shiawase	0:08
9.	"The Royal City of Rabanastre / Town Ward Upper Stratum"	王都ラバナスタ/市街地上層 Ōto Rabanasuta/ Shigaichi jōsō	5:28
10.	"Penelo's Theme"	パンネロのテーマ Pannero no Tēma	2:57
11.	"The Dream to be a Sky Pirate"	空賊への夢 Kūzoku e no yume	0:35
12.	"Little Rascal"	小悪党 Koakutō	3:03
13.	"The Dalmasca Estersand"	東ダルマスカ砂漠 Higashi Darumasuka sabaku	4:03
14.	"Level Up!"	レベルアップ! Reberu Appu!	0:07
15.	"Naivety"	童心 Dōshin	3:01
16.	"Coexistence (Imperial Version)"	共存 (帝国バージョン) Kyōson (teikoku bājon)	2:48
17.	"Signs of Change"	変化の兆し Henka no kizashi	2:21
18.	"Mission Start"	ミッション開始 Misshon kaishi	0:08
19.	"Rabanastre Downtown"	ラバナスタ・ダウンタウン Rabanasuta Dauntaun	2:40
20.	"Mission Failed"	ミッション失敗 Misshon shippai	0:13
21.	"Quiet Determination"	静かなる決意 Shizukanaru ketsui	3:33
22.	"The Dalmasca Westersand"	西ダルマスカ砂漠 Nishi Darumasuka sabaku	1:34
23.	"Clan Headquarters"	クラン本部 Kuran honbu	2:47
24.	"A Small Bargain"	小さな拾い物 Chīsa na hiroimono	0:09
25.	"Giza Plains"	ギーザ草原 Gīza sōgen	4:43
26.	"Separation with Penelo"	パンネロとの別れ Pannero tono wakare	0:31
27.	"The Garamsythe Waterway"	ガラムサイズ水路 Garamusaizu suiro	2:55
28.	"An Omen"	予兆 Yochō	2:48
29.	"Rebellion"	騒乱 Sōran	2:57
30.	"Nalbina Fortress Town Ward"	ナルビナ城塞市街地 Narubina jōsai shigaichi	2:22

Disc 2
No.	Title	Japanese title	Length
1.	"The Princess' Vision"	王女の幻影 Ōjo no gen'ei	3:19
2.	"Clash of Swords"	剣の一閃 Tsurugi no issen	2:35
3.	"Victory Fanfare ~FFXII Version~"	勝利のファンファーレ ~FFXIIバージョン~ Shōri no Fanfāre ~FFXII Bājon~	0:29
4.	"Abyss"	深淵 Shin'en	3:25
5.	"Dark Clouds (Imperial Version)"	暗雲 (帝国バージョン) An'un (teikoku Bājon)	2:00
6.	"A Promise with Balthier"	バルフレアとの約束 Barufurea to no yakusoku	0:37
7.	"Game Over"	ゲームオーバー Gēmu Ōbā	0:22
8.	"Nalbina Fortress Underground Prison"	ナルビナ城塞地下雑居房 Narubina jōsai chika zakkyobō	4:35
9.	"The Barbarians"	蛮族 Banzoku	2:29
10.	"Battle Drum"	戦いのドラム Tatakai no Doramu	2:46
11.	"Theme of the Empire"	帝国のテーマ Teikoku no Tēma	7:50
12.	"Chocobo FFXII Arrange Ver. 1"	チョコボFFXIIアレンジVer.1 Chokobo FFXII Arenji Ver.1	2:49
13.	"The Barheim Passage"	バルハイム地下道 Barhaimu chikadō	3:51
14.	"Sorrow (Liberation Army Version)"	悲哀 (解放軍バージョン) Hiai (kaihōgun Bājon)	3:36
15.	"Basch's Reminiscence"	バッシュの回想 Basshu no kaisō	0:57
16.	"Coexistence (Liberation Army Version)"	共存 (解放軍バージョン) Kyōson (kaihōgun Bājon)	2:50
17.	"The Skycity of Bhujerba"	空中都市ビュエルバ Kūchū toshi Byueruba	3:48
18.	"The Secret of Nethicite"	魔石の秘密 Maseki no himitsu	3:24
19.	"Dark Night (Imperial Version)"	闇夜 (帝国バージョン) An'ya (teikoku Bājon)	2:00
20.	"Speechless Fight"	言葉無き戦い Kotobanaki tatakai	2:33
21.	"The Dreadnought Leviathan Bridge"	戦艦リヴァイアサン艦橋 Senkan Rivaiasan kankyō	3:54
22.	"Challenging the Empire"	帝国への挑戦 Teikoku e no chōsen	3:19
23.	"State of Emergency"	切迫する事態 Seppakusuru jitai	3:16
24.	"Upheaval (Imperial Version)"	動乱 (帝国バージョン) Dōran (teikoku bājon)	3:13
25.	"The Tomb of Raithwall"	レイスウォール王墓 Reisuwōru ōbo	3:36

Disc 3
No.	Title	Japanese title	Length
1.	"The Sandsea"	大砂海 Daisakai	2:21
2.	"Esper Battle"	召喚獣戦 Shōkanjūsen	3:23
3.	"Sorrow (Imperial Version)"	悲哀 (帝国バージョン) Hiai (teikoku bājon)	2:49
4.	"Seeking Power"	求めし力 Motomeshi chikara	3:13
5.	"Desperate Fight"	死闘 Shitō	2:44
6.	"Jahara, Land of the Garif"	ガリフの地ジャハラ Garifu no chi Jahara	4:59
7.	"Ozmone Plains"	オズモーネ平原 Ozumōne heidan	2:30
8.	"The Golmore Jungle"	ゴルモア大森林 Gorumoa daishinrin	3:50
9.	"Eruyt Village"	エルトの里 Eruto no sato	4:13
10.	"You're Really a Child..."	本当に子供なんだから…。 Honto ni kodomo nandakara...	0:13
11.	"Chocobo ~FFXII Version~"	チョコボ ~FFXIIバージョン~ Chokobo ~FFXII Bājon~	2:04
12.	"An Imminent Threat"	迫る脅威 Semaru kyōi	2:45
13.	"Clash on the Big Bridge ~FFXII Version~"	ビッグブリッジの死闘 ~FFXIIバージョン~ Biggu Burijji no shitō ~FFXII Bājon~	2:46
14.	"Abandoning Power"	捨て去りし力 Sutesarishi chikara	2:36
15.	"The Stilshrine of Miriam"	ミリアム遺跡 Miriamu iseki	3:24
16.	"Time for a Rest"	安息の時 Ansoku no toki	2:10
17.	"White Room"	白い部屋 Shiroi heya	3:45
18.	"The Salikawood"	サリカ樹林 Sarika jurin	2:37
19.	"The Phon Coast"	フォーン海岸 Fōn kaigan	3:59
20.	"Destiny"	宿命 Shukumei	2:58
21.	"The Sochen Cave Palace"	ソーヘン地下宮殿 Sōhen chika kyūden	3:39
22.	"A Moment's Rest"	一時の休息 Ichiji no kyūsoku	4:32
23.	"Near the Water"	水のほとり Mizu no hotori	3:12
24.	"The Mosphoran Highwaste"	モスフォーラ山地 Mosufōra sanchi	2:50

Disc 4
No.	Title	Japanese title	Length
1.	"The Cerobi Steppe"	セロビ大地 Serobi daichi	3:13
2.	"Esper"	召喚 Shōkan	2:45
3.	"The Port of Balfonheim"	港町バーフォンハイム Minatomachi Bāfonhaimu	2:14
4.	"Nap"	仮眠 Kamin	0:14
5.	"The Zertinan Caverns"	ゼルテニアン洞窟 Zerutenian dōkutsu	3:23
6.	"A Land of Memories"	追憶の地 Tsuioku no chi	4:01
7.	"The Forgotten Capital"	忘れ去られし都 Wasuresarareshi miyako	4:16
8.	"The Feywood"	幻妖の森 Gen'yō no mori	4:15
9.	"Ashe's Theme"	アーシェのテーマ Āshe no Tēma	5:30
10.	"Giruvegan's Mystery"	ギルヴェガンの謎 Giruvegan no nazo	2:40
11.	"To the Place of the Gods"	神々の場所へ Kamigami no basho e	3:24
12.	"The Beginning of the End"	終局の始まり Shūkyoku no hajimari	3:37
13.	"To the Peak"	頂上へ Chōjō e	1:50
14.	"The Sky Fortress Bahamut"	空中要塞バハムート Kūchū yōsai Bahamūto	3:22
15.	"Shaking Bahamut"	揺れるバハムート Yureru Bahamūto	0:42
16.	"The Battle for Freedom"	自由への闘い Jiyū e no tatakai	8:52
17.	"The End of the Battle"	闘いの結末 Tatakai no ketsumatsu	1:14
18.	"Ending Movie"	エンディング・ムービー Endingu Mūbī	6:19
19.	"Kiss Me Good-Bye -featured in FINAL FANTASY XII-"	Kiss Me Good-Bye-featured in FINAL FANTASY XII- Kiss Me Good-Bye-featured in FINAL FANTASY XII-	4:59
20.	"Symphonic Poem "Hope" ~FINAL FANTASY XII PV ver.~"	交響詩「希望」Symphonic Poem "Hope" ~FINAL FANTASY XII PV ver.~ Kōkyōshi "Kibō" Symphonic Poem "Hope" ~FINAL FANTASY XII PV ver.~	3:55
21.	"Theme of FINAL FANTASY XII (Production Announcement Version)"	FINAL FANTASY XIIのテーマ (制作発表会バージョン) FINAL FANTASY XII no Tēma (seisaku happyōkai Bājon)	3:06

=== Piano album ===
Piano Collections Final Fantasy XII is an album of piano arrangements of music from the game. The thirteen tracks on the album, totaling 1:01:48 in length, were composed by Sakimoto and arranged and performed by Casey Ormond. The album was released by Square Enix on November 7, 2012 with the catalog number SQEX-10347, and was also published that same day as part of Final Fantasy XII OST & Piano Collections, a pack containing the album and the original soundtrack album with the catalog numbers SQEX-10348~52. A book of sheet music for the album has also been released.

Sakimoto originally heard of Ormond due to an arrangement he had made of "The Skycity of Bhujerba" in 2009, which, after discussion between the two about several other arrangements Ormond made of Sakimoto's work, lead to the two officially working together on Valkyria Chronicles Piano Pieces, an album of piano arrangements for Valkyria Chronicles. The style of arrangements on the Final Fantasy XII album range from classical to a "moody piece with plenty of sultry jazz tones", one of the two pieces located at the end of the album which Ormond had arranged prior to officially beginning the project. Many of the pieces contain an "improvisational" sense, even when not technically jazz-based, and several depart notably from the style of the original works. Ormond based many of the changes in theme or mood of his arrangements off of where the pieces were used in the original game, attempting to highlight the perspectives of different characters or ideas from the scenes they were played in.

The album was well received by reviewers, with Don Kotowski of Square Enix Music Online calling it one of the best Final Fantasy piano arrangement albums, a claim echoed by Derek Heemsbergen of RPGFan. Heemsbergen added that "Ormond shows reverence for Sakimoto's original material while exploring musical ideas in a style all his own" and praised the variety of the music. Kotowski praised both the "variety of moods" covered by the pieces as well as the overall cohesiveness of the album.

Track list
No.	Title	Japanese title	Length
1.	"Opening Movie (FFXII Theme) - To Be a Sky Pirate"	オープニング・ムービー（FINAL FANTASY XIIのテーマ） ～ 空賊への夢	4:03
2.	"Streets of Rabanastre"	王都ラバナスタ/市街地上層	4:34
3.	"The Dalmasca Estersand"	東ダルマスカ砂漠	6:19
4.	"On the Riverbank"	水のほとり	4:57
5.	"To Walk Amongst Gods"	神々の場所へ	4:54
6.	"Penelo's Theme"	パンネロのテーマ	4:16
7.	"Ashe's Theme"	アーシェのテーマ	4:12
8.	"The Archadian Empire"	帝国のテーマ	5:23
9.	"A Moment's Rest"	一時の休息	5:41
10.	"Nalbina Fortress"	ナルビナ城塞市街地	3:48
11.	"Lowtown"	ラバナスタ・ダウンタウン	4:37
12.	"Eruyt Village"	エルトの里	4:47
13.	"The Skycity of Bhujerba"	空中都市ビュエルバ	4:17

=== The Zodiac Age ===
Corresponding with the release of a high-definition remaster of the International Zodiac Job System version of Final Fantasy XII, subtitled The Zodiac Age, Square Enix released an album of music from the game. The 102-track album, released digitally and physically on Blu-ray on July 19, 2017, contains new compositions and arrangements of the original tracks by Sakimoto. A limited edition of the album included an additional CD of just the arrangements. Tien Hoang of VGMOnline reviewed the album, and found it a "great update to a complex score"; they felt that the live instruments improved the score, though not as much as a full orchestra could have, and found the new tracks to be "fine but not groundbreaking".

== Singles ==
=== Kiss Me Good-Bye ===
Kiss Me Good-Bye is the theme song of Final Fantasy XII, and is the third Japanese single by Angela Aki. The only vocal piece in the game, it was set to tunes composed by Nobuo Uematsu, arranged by Kenichiro Fukui and produced by Motoki Matsuoka. The single was released by Epic Records in Japan on March 15, 2006, covering a duration of 19:59 and bearing the catalog number ESCL-2810. A limited edition was also released bearing the catalog number ESCL-2808 featuring a DVD containing the Kiss Me Good-Bye video clip which included both shots of Aki performing the single and clips from the video game. Unlike previous Final Fantasy games, the theme song is sung in English in both the Japanese and North American versions of the game. The version featured on the CD single has a slightly different arrangement and Japanese lyrics; however, the English version that was featured in the game is included as a bonus track. An English version of the single was released as a digital single on May 16 the same year under the title Kiss Me Good-Bye [EP] in North America through Tofu Records.

"Kiss Me Good-bye" reached #6 on the Oricon charts and remained on the charts for 18 weeks. The release was seen by critics as an excellent single, with Gann feeling that both the Final Fantasy XII and non-game tracks held their weight equally.

=== Symphonic Poem "Hope" ===
Symphonic Poem "Hope" (交響詩「希望」, Kōkyōshi "Kibō") is a single released by violinist Taro Hakase and is the full version of the game's ending credits music. The piece has been described as a "mini-symphony" for Final Fantasy XII inspired by the main theme for the game. The single contains five tracks, arranged by Taro Hakase and Yuji Toriyama and produced by Taro Hakase, and features performance by the London Philharmonic Orchestra. A shorter edit blending the first, second and fifth movements of the symphonic poem was used in a promotional video for the game, and appears as a single track in the official soundtrack release. Symphonic Poem "Hope" was released on March 1, 2006 by Hats Unlimited bearing the catalog number HUCD-10015.

Hope was found by critics to be an enjoyable single, though at only 9 minutes long, Gann felt he could have "gotten by without it", although he said that for other listeners, their "collection may not be complete without this little gem". Dave of Square Enix Music Online concurred with that sentiment, saying that "despite the length of the album, it easily grew on" him. "Hope" reached #15 on the Oricon charts and remained on the charts for 16 weeks.

Track list
No.	Title	Japanese title	Length
1.	"1st mov. Overture"	第一楽章 序曲	0:59
2.	"2nd mov. March of a Wise man"	第二楽章 賢者の行進	1:04
3.	"3rd mov. Road of Hope"	第三楽章 ロード・オブ・ホープ	3:07
4.	"4th mov. Romance"	第四楽章 ロマンス	1:41
5.	"5th mov. Road of Hope ~ Refrain"	第五楽章 ロード・オブ・ホープ～リフレイン	1:54

== Legacy ==
"Kiss Me Good-bye" was performed by the Chicagoland Pops Orchestra and Angela Aki for Play! A Video Game Symphony, a worldwide video game music orchestral concert series. The Eminence Symphony Orchestra performed "Victory Fanfare", "Clan Headquarters", and "Penelo's Theme" at the three "Passion" concerts held in Australia and Singapore in December 2006. "Penelo's Theme" was again played at the Fantasy Comes Alive concert in Singapore on April 30, 2010. Selections of music from the game also appear on Japanese remix albums, called dojin music, and on English remixing websites.
