= Aquos Shot SH003 =

2009 mobile phone model

au AQUOS SHOT SH003
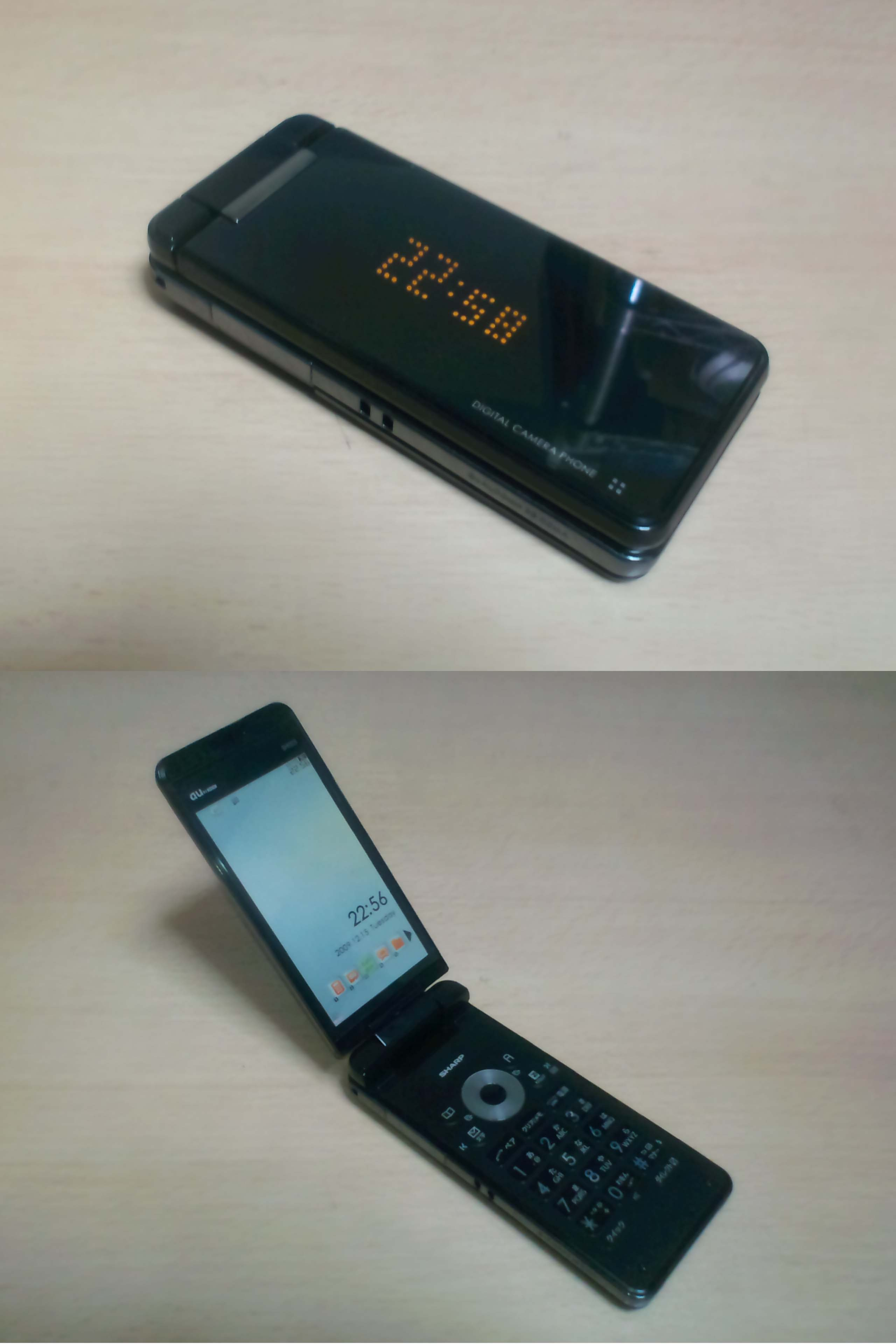
- SH003 in Matte Black
- Brand: au
- Manufacturer: Sharp
- First released: October 30, 2009
- Compatible networks: CDMA 1X WIN (CDMA2000 1xMC); 800 MHz / 2 GHz / New 800 MHz
- Form factor: 2-axis clamshell
- Colors: Matte Black; Silky White; Frosty Pink
- Dimensions: 112 mm × 51 mm × 16.6 mm (max thickness: 21 mm)
- Weight: 132 g (5 oz)
- Operating system: KCP+ (integrated OS)
- CPU: Qualcomm MSM7500 (600 MHz) (application: ARM11E equivalent) (modem: ARM9E equivalent)
- Storage: 760 MB (data folder)
- Removable storage: microSD (up to 2 GB), microSDHC (up to 16 GB) (officially supported by KDDI)
- Battery: Talk time: 260 minutes (domestic use); Stand-by time: 280 hours (domestic use, combined mobile and stationary)
- Charging: Approx. 150 minutes
- Rear camera: 12.1 megapixels, CCD image sensor, AF
- Front camera: None
- Display: 3.4-inch NEW Mobile ASV LCD, Wide VGA+ (480 × 854 pixels), approx. 260,000 colors, equipped with a touch panel Osaifu-Keitai (FeliCa) supported
- External display: LED, 7 × 17 pixels, single-color with 16-level grayscale
- Connectivity: CDMA 1X WIN (CDMA2000 1xEV-DO Rev.A)
- Data inputs: Ketai Shoin 9 (FSKAREN)
- Other: 1seg (supports Dubbing 10), FM radio, infrared (IrSimple), Bluetooth

The AQUOS SHOT SH003 is a CDMA 1X WIN-compatible, two-axis mobile phone developed and manufactured by Sharp for the Japanese domestic market, distributed under the au brand by KDDI and Okinawa Cellular Telephone Company. It was unveiled on October 19, 2009.

== Features ==
=== Camera ===
Sharing a nearly identical design aesthetic with the SH-06A offered by NTT Docomo and the 933SH by SoftBank, the SH003 represents the first model for au—and an important release among Japanese mobile phones—it is the first to feature a 12.1-megapixel CCD image sensor digital camera.

On the right side, it features a back light button and camera shutter.

Its photography feature set closely mirrors that of the SH-01B and 940SH.

=== Software ===
Its user interface (UI) has been overhauled to allow nearly all operations to be performed via touch, including text input and EZweb site scrolling. This UI element was omitted during the improvement process.

=== Display ===
The device features a touch screen mounted on a body with a dual-axis hinge. The primary display is a 3.4-inch full wide VGA LCD, standing as one of the largest displays for a clamshell phone worldwide at the time. Additionally, this device officially introduced native support for microSDHC memory cards (up to 16 GB, as published by KDDI) to Sharp's au lineup starting with the Winter 2009 model range.

The device features an 7x17 LED illumination system with 16 brightness levels that displays the time alongside incoming call and email notifications. Fitness tracking capabilities include a built-in pedometer that measures METs and general exercise.

=== Connectivity and other features ===
The device supports au services and the other features:

Main features and services
FM transmitter	remote viewing (recorded programs transferred from an AQUOS Blu-ray)	Bluetooth	Infrared communication
au LISMO Music Video Book	au Smart Sports	Global Passport CDMA	Jibun Bank
One-Seg mobile TV,	Navigation tools (e.g.) EZ Navi Walk and EZ Passenger Seat Navi	Decoration Animation	Osaifu-Keitai (EZ FeliCa) mobile wallet functionality
