= Rockin' the Suburbs =

Studio album by Ben Folds
- Released: September 11, 2001
- Recorded: 2000
- Genre: Alternative rock
- Length: 48:42
- Label: Epic
- Producers: Ben Folds, Ben Grosse

Ben Folds chronology
Rockin' the Suburbs (2001)	Ben Folds Live (2002)

Singles from Rockin' the Suburbs
- 1. "Rockin' the Suburbs" Released: April 17, 2001; 2. "Still Fighting It" Released: April 9, 2002

Professional ratings
Aggregate scores
Source	Rating
Metacritic	75/100
Review scores
Source	Rating
AllMusic	4.5/5 stars
Alternative Press	8/10
Entertainment Weekly	A−
The Guardian	3/5 stars
Los Angeles Times	3/4 stars
Pitchfork	6.3/10
Q	4/5 stars
Rolling Stone	3/5 stars
The Rolling Stone Album Guide	4/5 stars
Spin	7/10

Rockin' the Suburbs is the debut studio album by American singer-songwriter Ben Folds released on September 11, 2001, after Folds disbanded his group Ben Folds Five. Rockin' the Suburbs was recorded in Adelaide, Australia, where Folds was living at the time. He performed most of the instruments and vocals. Two singles from the album were released, "Rockin' the Suburbs", and "Still Fighting It".

== Track listing ==
All tracks are written by Ben Folds, except where noted.

No.	Title	Lyrics	Length
1.	"Annie Waits"		4:17
2.	"Zak and Sara"		3:11
3.	"Still Fighting It"		4:25
4.	"Gone"		3:22
5.	"Fred Jones Part 2"		3:45
6.	"The Ascent of Stan"		4:14
7.	"Losing Lisa"	Folds; Frally Hynes	4:10
8.	"Carrying Cathy"		3:49
9.	"Not the Same"		4:17
10.	"Rockin' the Suburbs"		5:00
11.	"Fired"		3:49
12.	"The Luckiest"		4:24
13.	"Hiro's Song" (Bonus track on Japanese CD and US vinyl releases.)		4:23

== Track notes ==
According to Folds, "Not the Same" is based on a true story of a person he knew who, under the influence of LSD, climbed a tree at a party hosted by Darren Jessee (not Robert Sledge, as the song states), stayed in the tree overnight, and when he came down the next morning was a born-again Christian. Folds used Sledge's name instead of Jessee's in the lyrics because he thought "it sounded better".

Folds performed "Gone" with Street Corner Symphony on the finale of Season 2 of The Sing-Off and performed "Not the Same" with the Dartmouth Aires on the finale of Season 3.

"Still Fighting It" is a bittersweet ode to the pain of adolescence dedicated to his son Louis. He later wrote an accompanying song for his daughter Gracie, which he named after her and included on his 2005 album Songs for Silverman. During live performances, he frequently plays the two songs together.

"Rockin' the Suburbs" parodies the nu metal style of Korn and Rage Against the Machine. Folds stated of the song "I am taking the piss out of the whole scene, especially the followers."

Ben Folds stated that "Hiro's Song" was actually one of his favorites from the album, stating "I also did not use a song called "Hiro" about a Japanese guy. That is actually one of my favorite songs of the album. But it didn’t sequence. I like songs about names and characters. Because people are interesting."

Of "Zak and Sara," Folds said,

I was thinking of these kids growing up in the Midwest. A 16 year old boy plays guitar and his girlfriend has to sit and watch him play all day. She just buzzes there and listens like she had nothing better to do. Maybe the girl is also writing songs and she has this idea in her of music that will happen in 20 years time. She really has some good ideas. But she is not saying anything, cause she is supposed to listen to her boyfriend. And he is playing music that was written 20 years ago.

== Personnel ==
Credits adapted from album’s liner notes.

- Ben Folds – piano, vocals, keyboards, guitars, bass guitar, drums
- Richard Fortus – additional guitar (tracks 3, 10)
- Larry Corbett – cello (track 5)
- DJ Swamp – additional beats (track 10)
- Frally Hynes – additional vocals (track 4)
- John McCrea – additional vocals (track 5)
- John Mark Painter – strings conductor and arranger

=== Production ===
- Producers: Ben Folds, Ben Grosse
- Recording: Ben Grosse, Andrew R. Wallace
- Mixing: Ben Grosse
- Additional Engineers: Blumpy, Cameron Webb
- Assistant Engineers: Rick Behrens, Aaron Lepley, Chuck Bailey, Justin Pynes, Uly Noriega, Dale Lawtone
- Programming: Ben Grosse, Andrew R. Wallace, Blumpy, Cameron Webb, John Vitale
- Programming Engineer: Andrew R. Wallace
- Mastering: Ted Jensen

== Legacy ==
"Rockin' the Suburbs" is Folds' only single to make Billboard's Modern Rock Tracks chart, peaking there at number 28 in September 2001. The album peaked at number 42 on the Billboard 200 chart, and at number 11 on the Top Internet Albums chart. A remake of the title track featuring William Shatner appeared in the soundtrack for the 2006 film Over the Hedge, which stars Shatner as an opossum named Ozzie.

== Charts ==
=== Album ===
Year	Chart	Position
2001	The Billboard 200	42
2001	Top Internet Albums	11

=== Singles ===
Year	Single	Chart	Position
2001	"Rockin' the Suburbs"	Modern Rock Tracks	28
