= Over the Hedge (soundtrack) =

2006 film soundtrack album

Over the Hedge (Music from the Motion Picture)

Soundtrack album by Rupert Gregson-Williams and Ben Folds
- Released: May 16, 2006
- Studios: Abbey Road Studios, London; AIR Studios, London; Signet Sound Studios, Los Angeles, California; The Mix Room, Burbank, California
- Genres: Pop; rock; soundtrack
- Length: 48:45
- Labels: Epic; Sony Music Soundtrax
- Producer: Hans Zimmer

Rupert Gregson-Williams chronology
| Love + Hate (2005) | Over the Hedge (2005) | Click (2006) |

Ben Folds chronology
| iTunes Originals – Ben Folds (2005) | Over the Hedge (2005) | Supersunnyspeedgraphic, the LP (2006) |

Over the Hedge (Music from the Motion Picture) is the soundtrack album to the 2006 DreamWorks Animation film Over the Hedge directed by Tim Johnson and Karey Kirkpatrick. The album features original score composed by Rupert Gregson-Williams and three original songs composed by Ben Folds, who also covered two previous hits. The album was released through Epic Records and Sony Music Soundtrax on May 16, 2006.

== Background ==
Over the Hedge is scored by Rupert Gregson-Williams in his first DreamWorks Animation project. His elder brother Harry had composed for several DreamWorks projects including Antz (1998), Chicken Run (2000), Shrek (2001), Sinbad: Legend of the Seven Seas (2003) and Shrek 2 (2004) before. Ben Folds wrote three original songs along with reusing his 2001 hit single "Rockin' the Suburbs" with William Shatner and a cover version of the Clash's 1979 song "Lost in the Supermarket". Originally Rupert wanted to create it as a "sweet orchestral score" but with Folds' involvement in the soundscape, he went ahead with a "more rock 'n' roll" sound adding, "We had never even met each other before this, but when he came in to work, there was no ego with him. He just loves music, so it was great fun working with him." The score is performed by West Australian Symphony Orchestra. It was released by Epic Records and Sony Music Soundtrax on May 16, 2006.

== Track listing ==
| No. | Title | Artist | Length |
|---|---|---|---|
| 1. | "Family of Me" | Ben Folds | 1:28 |
| 2. | "RJ Enters the Cave" | Rupert Gregson-Williams | 4:37 |
| 3. | "The Family Awakes" | Rupert Gregson-Williams | 2:33 |
| 4. | "Heist" | Ben Folds | 3:02 |
| 5. | "Lost in the Supermarket" | Ben Folds (Originally by The Clash) | 3:30 |
| 6. | "Let's Call It Steve" | Rupert Gregson-Williams | 3:40 |
| 7. | "Hammy Time" | Michael Whitlock | 2:28 |
| 8. | "Still" | Ben Folds | 2:38 |
| 9. | "Play?" | Rupert Gregson-Williams | 1:49 |
| 10. | "Rockin' the Suburbs" | Ben Folds (Featuring a speaking part by William Shatner) | 4:57 |
| 11. | "The Inside Heist" | Rupert Gregson-Williams | 7:38 |
| 12. | "RJ Rescues His Family" | Rupert Gregson-Williams | 4:18 |
| 13. | "Still (Reprise)" | Ben Folds | 6:07 |
| Total length: | | | 48:45 |

== Reception ==
Heather Phares of AllMusic wrote "Over the Hedge is smart enough for parents and fun enough for kids; it's refreshing when a family film soundtrack like this comes along every once in a while." John Hazelton of Screen International wrote "Three songs from jazz-rockartist Ben Folds punctuate the action, but none is particularly memorable and their inclusion (backing plot-turn montages) feels somewhat forced."

James Southall of Movie Wave wrote "it's the typical Media Ventures sound for a Dreamworks animation and could have been (and, perhaps unfairly, I can't help but think that it was) written by any or indeed all of Hans Zimmer's entourage. Still, it fulfils its purpose and provides a pleasant diversion for half an hour." Christian Clemmensen of Filmtracks wrote "there's simply too much distance between the score and songs for the 49-minute soundtrack album for Over the Hedge to function, especially with the two halves intermingled throughout. Score collectors specifically will hear material with no unique characteristics, making the whole basically adequate but forgettable."

== Legacy ==
Ben Folds considered "Still" as his career's best song, although it was not largely popular or being a fan favorite. Folds said that from a technical standpoint, "there's something about it that feels good and feels real and I remember the time in my life and how it felt, and there's a lot of brilliant, simple moments that in the world we live in, are not going to be given a fair shake" though it cannot be suitable for concert experience. The song "Still" was performed by Billie Eilish on piano which she shared in a TikTok video.

== Personnel ==
Credits adapted from liner notes:

- Original score – Rupert Gregson-Williams
- Original songs – Ben Folds
- Music producer – Hans Zimmer
- Additional music – Halli Cauthery
- Orchestra conductor – Alastair King, Rupert Gregson-Williams
- Orchestration – Alastair King, Rupert Gregson-Williams, Bradley Miles, Seanine Joyce, Simon Whiteside
- Leader – Gavyn Wright
- Contractor – Isobel Griffiths Ltd.
- Score technical engineer – Abhay Manusmare, Richard Robson
- Assistant technical engineer – Chris Barrett, Jake Jackson, Rob Houston, Rupert Coulson, Sam Okell
- Recording – Alan Meyerson, Nick Wollage
- Mixing – Alan Meyerson, Joe Costa
- Assistant mixing – Jeff Biggers
- Mastering and compilation – Chris Athens, Dave Donnelly, Ted Jensen
- Music editor – Slamm Andrews
- Musical assistance – Tony Clarke
- Executive producer – Sunny Park
- Score coordinator – Becky Bentham
- Music coordinator – Cindi Smith, Julie Imboden Keel, Ken "Kaz" Smith
- Score preparation – Dakota Music
- Art direction – Gabrielle Raumberger
- Design – Kimiyo Nishio
- Music clearance – Julie Butchko
- Music business affairs – Lenny Wohl

== Charts ==
| Chart (2006) | Peak position |
|---|---|
| US Top Soundtracks (Billboard) | 12 |
