= Songbook (Angela Aki album) =

Studio album by Angela Aki
- Released: January 11, 2012 (Japan)
- Genre: J-pop
- Label: Sony Music Japan

Angela Aki chronology
| White (2011) | Songbook (2012) | BLUE (2012) |

Songbook is a cover album released by Angela Aki on January 11, 2012.

The album contains covers of 12 popular English songs, mostly translated into Japanese, with some original English lyrics retained.

== Track listing ==
CD track list
| No. | Title | Length |
|---|---|---|
| 1. | "Honesty" (Billy Joel) |
| 2. | "Will You Dance?" (Janis Ian) |
| 3. | "We're All Alone" (Boz Scaggs) |
| 4. | "Material Girl" (Madonna) |
| 5. | "True Colors" (Cyndi Lauper) |
| 6. | "Without You" (Badfinger) |
| 7. | "Today" (The Smashing Pumpkins) |
| 8. | "Kiss from a Rose" (Seal) |
| 9. | "A Song for You" (Leon Russell) |
| 10. | "Creep" (Radiohead) |
| 11. | "Still Fighting It" (Ben Folds) |
| 12. | "It's So Hard to Say Goodbye to Yesterday" (originally by G.C. Cameron; Boyz II Men cover) |

DVD track list
| No. | Title | Length |
|---|---|---|
| 1. | "NHK "Songbook" Off Shots" |
| 2. | "Honesty" (live video) |
| 3. | "We're All Alone" (live video) |

== Charts ==
Oricon Sales chart (Japan)

| Release | Sales total | Chart run |
|---|---|---|
| Oricon Weekly Albums Chart | 5,868 | 11 weeks |

== Release history ==
| Region | Date | Format | Distributing label | Catalogue codes |
|---|---|---|---|---|
| Japan | January 11, 2012 | CD, CD/DVD, digital download | Sony | ESCL-3820, ESCL-3818~9 |
| Japan | January 28, 2012 | Rental CD | Sony | ESCL-3820 |
