= Still Fighting It =

Single by Ben Folds

from the album Rockin' the Suburbs
- Released: April 9, 2002
- Genre: Alternative rock, pop rock
- Length: 4.25
- Label: Epic
- Songwriter: Ben Folds

Ben Folds singles chronology
"Rockin' the Suburbs" (2001)	"Still Fighting It" (2002)	"Tiny Dancer" (2005)

Music video
- "Still Fighting It" on YouTube

"Still Fighting It" is a song by Ben Folds released in 2002 as the second single from his 2001 album Rockin' the Suburbs. The song is a bittersweet ode to the pain of adolescence dedicated to his son Louis. He would later write an accompanying song for his daughter Gracie on the 2005 album Songs for Silverman, and he often performs the two songs together live. The B-sides on the single release of "Still Fighting It" are live versions of "Zak & Sara" from Rockin' the Suburbs and "Boxing" from Ben Folds Five's self-titled debut album.

Angela Aki covered the song for the B-side of her single "Tegami: Haikei Jūgo no Kimi e", which was released in 2008. Another cover of this song was performed by Lee Chan-sol for the soundtrack of the 2020 South Korean television drama Itaewon Class.

== Single track listing ==
1. "Still Fighting It"
2. "Zak & Sara" (Live)
3. "Boxing" (Live)
4. "Still Fighting It" (Video)

== Popular culture ==
The track "Still Fighting It" was featured in the Scrubs episode "My New Suit". The song was also used in a government information film in the UK about cyberbullying called "Let's Fight It Together".

On an episode of The Ryen Russillo Podcast, the song's chorus was sung by Scott Van Pelt to describe Ryen's feelings of melancholy after seeing a father and son purchase a shovel together.

== Music video ==
The music video was filmed in Adelaide, Australia on the Glenelg tram and at Port Willunga.
