= Answer (Angela Aki album) =

Studio album by Angela Aki
- Released: February 25, 2009
- Genre: Pop
- Length: 69:50
- Label: Epic Records Japan

Angela Aki chronology
Today (2007)	Answer (2009)	Life (2010)

Singles from ANSWER
- 1. "Tegami (Haikei Jūgo no Kimi e)" Released: September 17, 2008

ANSWER, released on February 25, 2009 is Angela Aki's 3rd Japanese studio album. It sold 74,068 copies in its first week, peaking at Number 1 on the Oricon charts. It includes a re-recording of We're All Alone, a song that she had previously covered on One. This marks the second time Angela has re-recorded a song from that 2005 Indie album for inclusion on a major label release. It was released in two editions – the regular CD edition, and a limited first-press only edition which includes a DVD.

== Track listing ==
No.	Title	Length
1.	"Tegami (Haikei Jūgo no Kimi e) (手紙 ～拝啓 十五の君へ～, Letter ~Greetings to a 15 Year Old~)"	5:15
2.	"Knockin' on Heaven's Door"	5:02
3.	"ANSWER"	4:34
4.	"Somebody Stop Me"	4:14
5.	"Dahlia (ダリア)"	7:40
6.	"Final Destination"	4:40
7.	"Our Story"	4:22
8.	"Tasogare (黄昏, Evening)"	5:17
9.	"We're All Alone (Boz Scaggs Cover)"	4:35
10.	"Reflection (リフレクション)"	4:18
11.	"Requiem (レクイエム)"	10:37
12.	"Black Glasses (featuring Ben Folds)"	3:44
13.	"Fighter (ファイター)"	9:19

(+DVD)(First Press Limited Edition)
No.	Title	Length
1.	"Tegami: Haikei Jūgo no Kimi e Sotsugyō (Music documentary film)"
2.	"NHK Minna no Uta "Tegami: Haikei Jūgo no Kimi e" (Video animation)"
3.	"Tegami: Haikei Jūgo no Kimi e (Video Karaoke)"
4.	"Tegami: Haikei Jūgo no Kimi e (Music Video)"

== Charts (Japan) ==
Release	Oricon Albums Chart	Peak position	Debut sales (copies)	Sales total (copies)	Chart run
February 25, 2009	Daily Chart	# 1	9,600 (first day)	168,408	36 weeks
February 25, 2009	Weekly Chart	# 1	74,068	168,408	36 weeks
February 25, 2009	Monthly Chart	# 9	124,271	168,408	36 weeks
February 25, 2009	Yearly Chart (2009)	# 52	161,098	168,408	36 weeks

== Release history ==
Region	Date	Format	Distributing label	Catalogue codes
Japan	February 25, 2009	CD, CD/DVD, digital download	Sony	ESCL-3170, ESCL-3168~9
Hong Kong	February 27, 2009	CD	Sony	88697464432
Singapore	February 27, 2009	CD	Sony	88697464432
Taiwan	March 6, 2009	CD	Sony	88697464432
South Korea	March 10, 2009	CD, digital download	Sony	2374423
Japan	March 14, 2009	Rental CD	Sony	ESCL-3170
