= Ai no Kisetsu =

Single by Angela Aki

from the album Life
- Released: September 16, 2009 (Japan)
- Genre: J-pop
- Length: 12:08
- Label: Sony Music Japan
- Songwriter: Angela Aki

Angela Aki singles chronology
"Tegami (Haikei Jūgo no Kimi e)" (2008)	"Ai no Kisetsu" (2009)	"Kagayaku Hito" (2010)

"Ai no Kisetsu (愛の季節, Seasons of Love)" is the ninth single by Japanese singer Angela Aki and was released on September 16, 2009, one year after her previous single's release. The single contains the song "It's So Hard to Say Goodbye to Yesterday", which is a cover of song by American singer G. C. Cameron by the same title. "Ai no Kisetsu" was used as a theme song for NHK drama, Tsubasa.

== Track listing ==
CD
No.	Title	Writer(s)	Arranger(s)	Length
1.	"Ai no Kisetsu (愛の季節, Seasons of Love)"	Angela Aki	Angela Aki, Yoshinori Abe	5:06
2.	"Emily (エミリー)"	Angela Aki	Angela Aki	3:57
3.	"It's So Hard to Say Goodbye to Yesterday" (G. C. Cameron cover)	Christine Yarian Perren, Frederick Perren	Angela Aki	3:05

DVD: Music videos
No.	Title	Length
1.	"Ai no Kisetsu (愛の季節, Seasons of Love)" (Music video)
2.	"Ai no Kisetsu (愛の季節, Seasons of Love)" (Making Video)
3.	"Naniwa no MY KEYS 2008 in Osaka-jo Hall (浪花のMY KEYS 2008 in 大阪城ホール, MY KEYS 2008 in Osaka-jo Hall of Naniwa)" & "MY KEYS 2008 in Budokan (MY KEYS 2008 in 武道館, MY KEYS 2008 in Budokan)" (Live DVD Premiere Movie)

== Charts ==
Release	Oricon Albums Chart	Peak position	Debut sales (copies)	Sales total (copies)	Chart run
September 16, 2009	Daily Chart (first day)	#5	-	16.651*	5 weeks
September 16, 2009	Weekly Chart	#7	9,571	16.651*	5 weeks
September 16, 2009	Monthly Chart (September)	#33	13,278	16.651*	5 weeks
