= White (Angela Aki album) =

Studio album by Angela Aki
- Released: September 28, 2011
- Genre: Pop
- Length: 50:35
- Label: Epic Records Japan

Angela Aki chronology
Life (2010)	White (2011)	Songbook (2012)

Singles from White
- 1. "Hajimari no Ballad" Released: June 8, 2011

White is the fifth studio album released by Angela Aki, released on September 28, 2011 in two editions, standard and limited. The limited one includes a bonus DVD with a music video of "Hajimari no Ballad" and performance footage held at a museum in June 2011.

== Singles ==
- "Hajimari no Ballad" is the only single from the album, released in the physical format on June 8, 2011. "Hajimari no Ballad" was used as the theme song for the Japanese dorama Namae wo Nakushita, Megami and "I Have a Dream", a song included in the CD, was used as the theme song for the Washington National Gallery of Art Exhibit in Japan iPhone app.

=== Other songs ===
- "Tsugaru Kaikyō Fuyugeshiki" was used in a TV commercial for Uniqlo's 2011 winter collection in Japan.

== Track listing ==
CD

No.	Title	Title translation	Length
1.	"Hajimari no Ballad (始まりのバラード)"	Ballad of Beginning	4:54
2.	"Tsugaru Kaikyō Fuyugeshiki (津軽海峡・冬景色)" (Ishikawa Sayuri cover)	Tsugaru Strait • Winter Landscape	3:50
3.	"I Have a Dream"	/	4:48
4.	"Julio (フリオ)"	Julio	5:10
5.	"My Grandfather's Clock"	/	4:29
6.	"Moral no Soushiki -revival- (モラルの葬式 -revival-)"	Funeral of Morals -revival-	5:48
7.	"Furusato~HOME (ふるさと~HOME)"	Hometown~HOME	6:25
8.	"Mokugekisha (目撃車)"	Eyewitness	5:13
9.	"Honesty" (Billy Joel cover)	/	3:53
10.	"One Family"	/	5:40

DVD

No.	Title	Length
1.	"HOME SWEET HOME "5YEARS" ~Best Hit & All Requests~ SPECIAL MOVIE"
2.	"Washington National Gallery Exhibition Digest"
3.	"Hajimari no Ballad (Video Clip)"

== Charts ==
Chart	Peak Position
Oricon Weekly Album Charts	4

== Release history ==
Region	Date	Format	Distributing label	Catalogue codes
Japan	September 28, 2011	CD, CD/DVD, digital download	Sony	ESCL-3780, ESCL-3778~9
Japan	October 15, 2011	Rental CD	Sony	ESCL-3780
South Korea	November 10, 2011	CD, digital download	Sony	2418156
Hong Kong	November 11, 2011	CD/DVD	Sony	88697975692
Singapore	November 25, 2011	CD/DVD	Sony	88697975692
Taiwan	December 16, 2011	CD/DVD	Sony	88697975692
