= One (Angela Aki EP) =

EP by Angela Aki
- Released: March 9, 2005
- Genre: Pop
- Length: N/A
- Label: Virgo Music Entertainment

Angela Aki chronology
These Words (2000)	One (2005)	Home (2006)

One is an Angela Aki's first mini-album. It was her debut Japanese language release, under the independent Virgo Music Entertainment label. The album features three original compositions and three cover songs (with the cover songs' lyrics being rewritten into Japanese by Aki herself). The entire album is in Japanese except for the song "Warning". It debuted at #2 in the HMV's indies charts and by the end of the year it had reached #1. The song "Aisuru Mono" was used as the Hitachi DVD Cam CM song.

== Track listing ==
No.	Title	Length
1.	"We're All Alone (Boz Scaggs cover)"	4:25
2.	"Rain"	3:55
3.	"A Song For You (Leon Russell cover)"	4:23
4.	"Warning"	3:48
5.	"Never Is a Promise (Fiona Apple cover)"	4:56
6.	"Aisuru Mono (愛するもの, People I Love)"	3:58

== Charts ==
One - Oricon Sales chart (Japan)

Release	Chart	Peak position	Chart run
March 6, 2005	Oricon Weekly Albums Chart	88	9 weeks
