= Sakurairo (Angela Aki song) =

"サクラ色" "Sakurairo / "Color Of Sakura"

Single by Angela Aki

from the album Today
- Released: March 7, 2007 (Japan)
- Genre: J-pop
- Length: 20:14
- Label: Sony Music Japan
- Songwriter: Angela Aki

Angela Aki singles chronology
"This Love" (2006)	"サクラ色" "Sakurairo / "Color Of Sakura" (2007)	"Kodoku no Kakera" (2007)

"Sakurairo" (サクラ色) is the fifth single by Japanese singer Angela Aki. It was released on March 7, 2007, and revealed for the first time in her one-man live at Nippon Budokan in December 2006. The song reflects her missing Japan while she was studying in Washington DC. The single is released in CD+DVD (first press only edition) and CD-only (standard edition) formats. It sold 29,948 copies in its first week.

== Track listing ==
All tracks are written by Angela Aki.

CD
No.	Title	Arranger(s)	Length
1.	"Sakura iro"	Seiji Kameda	5:18
2.	"On&On"	Seiji Kameda	4:55
3.	"Power of Music" (Rearrangement of Music)	Shin Kono, Angela Aki	4:27
4.	"Home (Piano Version)" (Bonus Track)	Angela Aki	5:34

+DVD (First Press Limited Edition)
No.	Title	Length
1.	"Sakura iro" (Music video)
2.	"Home" (Live)
3.	"Sakura iro" (Making Of Music Video)

== Charts ==
Release	Chart	Peak position	Sales total
March 7, 2007	Oricon Weekly Singles Chart	8	103,176
March 7, 2007	Oricon Daily Singles Chart	8	
