= Today (Angela Aki album) =

Studio album by Angela Aki
- Released: September 19, 2007 (Japan)
- Genre: J-pop
- Length: 65:33
- Label: Epic Records Japan

Angela Aki chronology
Home (2006)	Today (2007)	Answer (2009)

Singles from Today
- 1. "Sakura iro" 2. "Kodoku no Kakera"; 3. "Tashika ni"

Today is the second studio album from Angela Aki. This album was released in two different versions. A limited edition CD+DVD version and a CD only version. It has topped the Oricon Top 200 Weekly chart and has so far sold over 200,000 copies.

== Track listing ==
No.	Title	Length
1.	"Sakura iro (サクラ色, Cherry Blossom-colored)"	5:18
2.	"Again"	4:33
3.	"Today"	4:46
4.	"Ai no Uta (愛のうた, Love Song)"	6:01
5.	"Tashika ni (たしかに, Surely)"	4:58
6.	"Silent Girl"	3:47
7.	"Moral no Sōshiki (モラルの葬式, Funeral of Morals)"	5:46
8.	"Otome Gokoro (乙女心, Maiden Heart)"	4:16
9.	"One Melody"	5:34
10.	"Tomo no Shirushi (友のしるし, Symbol of Friendship)"	4:53
11.	"Kodoku no Kakera (孤独のカケラ, Fragments of Solitude)"	5:23
12.	"On & On"	4:55
13.	"Surrender"	5:22

(+DVD)(First Press Limited Edition)
No.	Title	Length
1.	"Sakura iro (サクラ色) Music Video"
2.	"Kodoku no Kakera (孤独のカケラ) -Special Ver.- Music Video"
3.	"Tashika ni (たしかに) Music Video"
4.	"Again (Live 2007.4.30 In NHK Hall)"
5.	"Sakura iro (サクラ色) (Live 2007.4.30 in NHK Hall)"
6.	"Kodoku no Kakera (孤独のカケラ, Fragments of Solitude) (Live 2007.4.30 in NHK Hall)"
7.	"Making Of Sakura iro (サクラ色)"
8.	"Making Of Kodoku no Kakera (孤独のカケラ)"
9.	"Making Of Tashika ni (たしかに)"
10.	"Today Recording Document"

== Promotional Performances ==
1. 09/14 - Music Station (Again)

== Release history ==
Region	Date	Format	Distributing label	Catalogue codes
Japan	September 19, 2007	CD, CD/DVD, digital download	Sony	ESCL-3030, ESCL-3028~9
South Korea	September 20, 2007	CD, digital download	Sony	2353486
Taiwan	September 21, 2007	CD	Sony	88697160762
Hong Kong	September 25, 2007	CD	Sony	88697160762
Singapore	September 25, 2007	CD	Sony	88697202832
Japan	October 1, 2007	Rental CD	Sony	ESCL-3030
