= Blue (Angela Aki album) =

Studio album by Angela Aki
- Released: July 18, 2012
- Genre: J-Pop
- Label: Epic Records Japan

Angela Aki chronology
Songbook (2012)	Blue (2012)	Tapestry of Songs: The Best of Angela Aki (2014)

Singles from Blue
- 1. "Kokuhaku" Released: July 18, 2012

Blue is the seventh studio album by Angela Aki and was released on Sony Music Japan. It is available in two editions, regular and limited; both versions include a signed postcard.

== Singles ==
- "Kokuhaku" (告白 / Confession) is the first single from the album, released on 18 July 2012. The track was used as the ending theme song for the anime Uchuu Kyoudai.

== Track listing ==
CD

No.	Title	Length
1.	"Aiueo (アイウエオ / Alphabetical)"
2.	"Kokuhaku (告白 / Confession (of Love))"
3.	"Foolish Love"
4.	"Koi no Kakehiki (恋の駆け引き / Haggling Love)"
5.	"Cry"
6.	"In My Blood"
7.	"You and I"
8.	"Monster (モンスター)"
9.	"Kokoro no Tenkiyohou (心の天気予報 / The Weather Forecast for the Heart)"
10.	"factory"
11.	"Yoake Mae no Inori (夜明け前の祈り / A Prayer Before Dawn)"
12.	"Blue"
13.	"One Family ~Uchuu no Nagisa~ (宇宙の渚 / Nagisa of the Universe)"

DVD

No.	Title	Length
1.	"Kokuhaku (Music Video)"
2.	"Kokuhaku (Music Video - Anime Version)"
3.	"Kokuhaku (Making-of)"
4.	""My Keys 2011 in Nihon Budokan Power of Music ~All Specials Request~" Live Video"

== Charts ==
Chart	Peak Position
Oricon Weekly Album Charts	14
Oricon Monthly Album Charts	46

== Release history ==
Region	Date	Format	Distributing label	Catalogue codes
Japan	July 18, 2012	CD, CD/DVD, digital download	Sony	ESCL-3940, ESCL-3938~9
Hong Kong	July 19, 2012	CD/DVD	Sony	88725458572F
Taiwan	July 20, 2012	CD/DVD	Sony	88725452012
Hong Kong	August 1, 2012	CD/DVD	Sony	88725458572
Japan	August 4, 2012	Rental CD	Sony	ESCL-3940
Singapore	August 24, 2012	CD/DVD	Sony	88725458572
