= Rockin' the Suburbs (song) =

Single by Ben Folds

from the album Rockin' the Suburbs
- Released: April 17, 2001
- Recorded: 2000
- Genre: Comedy rock
- Length: 4.58
- Label: Epic
- Songwriter: Ben Folds

Ben Folds singles chronology
"Rockin' the Suburbs" (2001)	"Still Fighting It" (2002)

Music video
- "Rockin' the Suburbs" on YouTube

"Rockin' the Suburbs" is a song by Ben Folds from his debut solo album, Rockin' the Suburbs, released on April 17, 2001. Written as a parody of the nu metal genre, it reached number 28 on the Billboard Alternative Airplay chart.

== Music and lyrics ==
The song is a parody of nu metal, partly inspired by Korn. In 2000, Folds played the Summer Sonic Festival in Japan and noticed some "big hairy Americans" heckling him from the side of the stage. He later recognised them on the cover of Spin as members of Korn, where they were also quoted as saying "Ben Folds Five are fucking pussies. They play fucking Cheers music." Folds then listened to their music and while he enjoyed it, he found it "one-tracked emotionally." He started to parody Korn during his sets by "screaming in a heavy metal falsetto... things like: Feel my pain, I am white, feel my pain." This ultimately led to the writing of "Rockin' the Suburbs", though Folds decided not to specifically name names as he felt the song was stronger if "not directed to anybody."

== Single track listing ==
1. "Rockin' the Suburbs" [Radio Edit]
2. "Girl"
3. "Make Me Mommy"
4. "Rockin' the Suburbs" [Video]

Japanese EP:

1. "Rockin' the Suburbs" [Radio Edit]
2. "One Down"
3. "Girl"
4. "Make Me Mommy"
5. "The Secret Life of Morgan Davis"

== Music video ==
The music video for "Rockin' the Suburbs" was directed by Folds' friend "Weird Al" Yankovic, who also plays the role of a producer who fixes Folds' "shitty track", directly riffing on one of the song's lyrics. The video features Folds playing multiple members of an angry rock band in a suburban den and in front of a white background.

At the end of the song's second verse, Folds sings the lyrics, "Girl, give me something I can break", which are a riff on the Limp Bizkit song "Break Stuff". After the song's bridge, Folds is shown outside in a suburban neighborhood wearing a backwards red New York Yankees cap, the trademark of Limp Bizkit's frontman Fred Durst. During this portion of the video, Folds engages in "suburban" activities such as skateboarding, jumping in pools and flipping burgers.

At the end of the video, the "band" (all played by Folds again) plays in front of a black background with holes punched in it, a style that deliberately matches the live-action parts of the Korn video for "Freak on a Leash." A subliminal message reading "Korn Sucks" briefly appears.

== Charts ==
=== Weekly charts ===
Chart (2001)	Peak position
US Alternative Airplay (Billboard)	28

== Over the Hedge remake ==
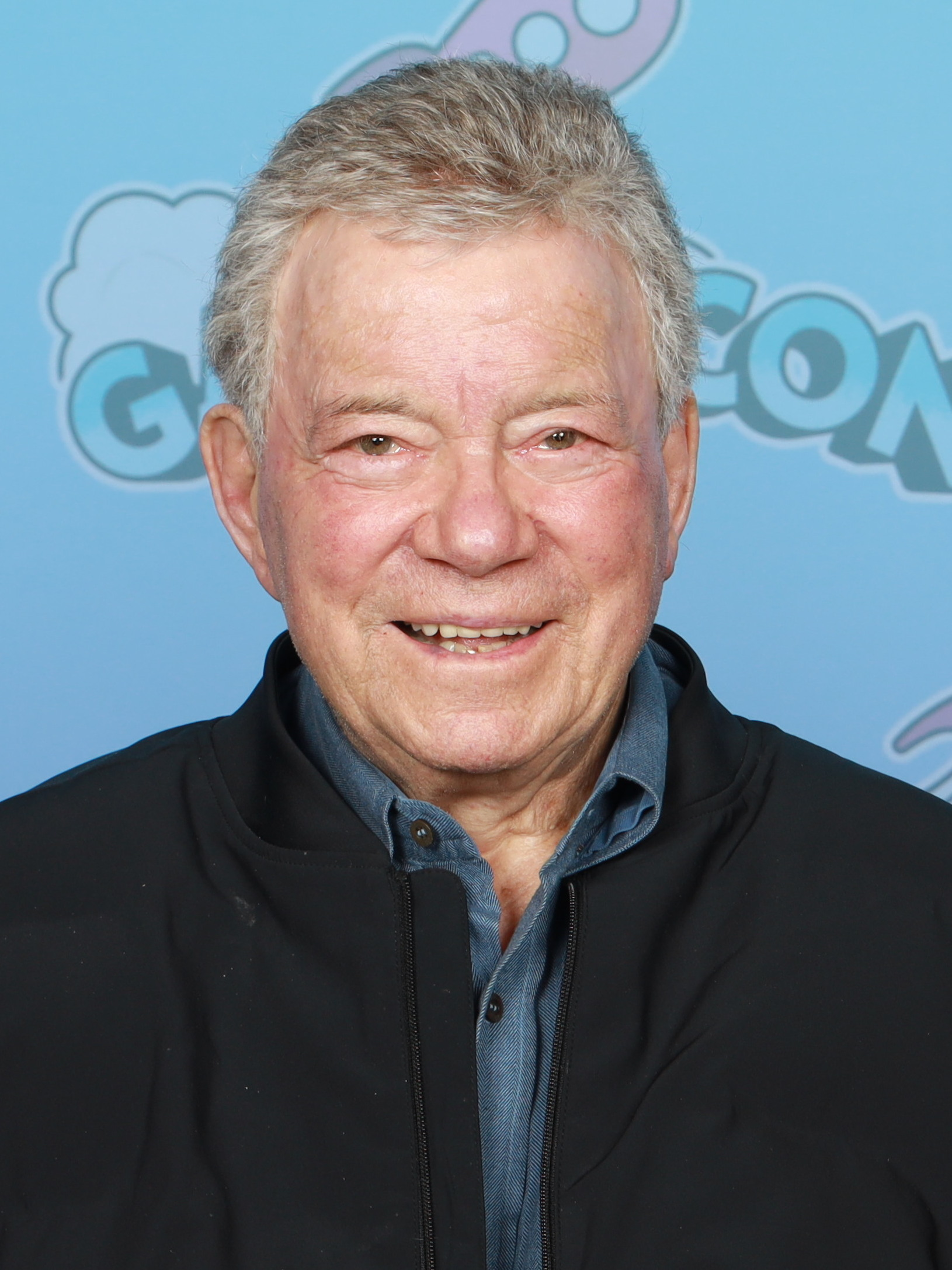
William Shatner provided additional vocals for the Over the Hedge version.

In 2006, Folds rewrote the song for the animated movie Over the Hedge, with film co-star William Shatner providing vocals during part of the song. Shatner does the voice for Ozzie the Opossum, who encourages his teenage daughter Heather (voiced by Avril Lavigne) to play dead in threatening situations.

While this version features entirely new lyrics intended to be more family-friendly than the original, Folds maintains the song’s satirical edge. The rewritten lyrics focus more on the institution of suburbia, and include jabs at homeowner associations, tract housing, consumerism, and developments built on Native American burial grounds.

This version of the song was also featured in the film Marley & Me during the montage of Marley growing up in a year from a small puppy to a big dog for the rest of the movie.
