= LISMO =

Online music service

LISMO (au Listen Mobile Service) was an online music service provided by au, a Japanese mobile phone brand run by KDDI, a Japanese telecommunication company. This service was introduced on January 19, 2006, and the service began operating at the end of January in Japan. The first mobile phone which supports LISMO was sold on January 26, 2006. In 2008, KDDI and Okinawa Cellular introduced 'LISMO Video', a new service with new means to enjoy video content as well.

As of In April 2013, KDDI acquired Taiwanese streaming service KKBOX. The LISMO and KKBOX services were merged under the KKBOX name. KKBOX is now expanding into other Asian markets.

The discontinuation of LISMO WAVE on September 30, 2019 marked the end of the LISMO brand.

== Mascot ==
The mascot of this service was LISMO-kun (リスモくん). The "LIS" in "LISMO" is pronounced the same as squirrel (リス, risu) in Japanese. It is a silhouette of a squirrel carrying an orange logo with earphones connected to it. Some original goods of this mascot are sold only at the "LISMO FOREST" of KDDI Designing Studio.

== Supported phones ==
LISMO is supported by CDMA 1X WIN phones.

Released in 2006

- Casio: W41CA,"G'zOne" (W42CA), W43CA
- Hitachi: W41H, W42H, W43H, W43HII
- Kyocera: W41K, W42K, W43K, W44K
- Sanyo: W41SA, W42SA, W43SA
- Sharp: W41SH
- Sony Ericsson: W41S,"Walkman Phone" (W42S), W43S, W44S
- Toshiba: "Music-HDD" (W41T), W43T, W44T, W44TII, W44TIII, W45T, "DRAPE" (W46T), W47T
- au design project: "neon" (W42T by Toshiba)

Released in 2007

- Casio: W51CA, W52CA,"EXILIM Phone" W53CA
- Hitachi: W51H, W52SH, "Wooo Phone" W53H
- Kyocera: W51K
- Panasonic: W51P, W52P
- Sanyo: W51SA, W52SA, W53SA
- Sharp: "AQUOS Phone" (W51SH), W52SH
- Sony Ericsson: W51S,"Walkman Phone" W52S, W53S
- Toshiba: W51T, W52T, W53T, W54T, W55T
- au design project: "Media Skin" (W52K by Kyocera), and "INFOBAR 2" (W55SA by Sanyo)

Released in 2008

- Casio: W61CA,"G'zOne" (W62CA), "EXILIM PHONE" W63CA
- Hitachi: W61H, "Wooo Phone" (W62H / W63H)
- Kyocera: W61K, W64K, W65K
- Panasonic: W61P, W62P
- Pantech&Curitel: W61PT
- Sanyo: W61SA, W62SA, W63SA, W64SA
- Sharp: "AQUOS Phone" (W61SH / W64SH), W62SH, "URBANO" (W63SH)
- Sony Ericsson: "Cyber-Shot Phone" W61S, W62S, "re" (W63S), W64S, "Walkman Phone, Xmini" (W65S)
- Toshiba: W61T, W62T, "Sportio" (W63T), W64T, W65T

Released in 2009

- Casio: CA001
- Hitachi: "Wooo Phone" (H001)
- Panasonic: P001
- Sharp: SH001
- Sony Ericsson: "Cyber-shot phone" S001, "Walkman Phone, Premier3(Cube)" (SOY01)
- Toshiba: T001

== Features ==
=== Function overview ===
This system provides the following functions;

- Listen to music on a mobile phone and/or a personal computer.
- Download and share music on a mobile phone and/or a personal computer.
- Copy music from a CD (compact disc) to a mobile phone.
- Share playlists with other LISMO users.
- Use downloaded music as a ringtone
- Backup address book data etc. to a personal computer

=== File format ===
Under investigation

The music file has .KMF extension on the phone and becomes .KDR on the PC, the codec is HE-AAC with 48 kbit/s bitrate, which is same as au's full track ringtone service.

=== Core services ===
- au Music Player
  A music player application for au's mobile phone. Music on the handset can be managed through this application program.
- au Music Port
  A mobile phone data managing application for a personal computer. This application is used to share and backup data from a mobile phone. Manages not only music data, but also other data in the mobile phone like camera data, PIM data, etc. Supports only Microsoft Windows
- au Music Store
  A service similar with the iTunes Music Store. Customers can download and purchase music with PC. The average price of one song is about 315 Yen (including taxes) and there are 20,000 songs available at the beginning of service.
- Uta Tomo (うたとも) (TM)
  Play list sharing service. Works over au's server.

== Commercials ==
LISMO commercials, which changes approx. every 3 months, use many songs by J-pop artists. On March 5, 2008, an album titled Best of LISMO! was released. The album contains all 10 songs used in LISMO commercials that aired by the Summer 2007.

List of songs used in the commercial (in order of which the commercial aired):

1. Hana - Orange Range
2. Ishindenshin - Orange Range
3. Keep Tryin' - Hikaru Utada
4. By My Melody - Ken Hirai
5. Mikazuki - Ayaka
6. Lovers Again - Exile
7. Cherry - Yui
8. Tashika ni - Angela Aki
9. Stay with Me - Kumi Koda

== See also ==
- Sony Connect
- Mora (music store)
- iTunes Music Store
- Japanese mobile phone culture
