= These Words (album) =

Studio album by Angela Aki
- Released: January 4, 2000
- Recorded: Jammin Java Studios, Vienna, VA
- Genre: Indie pop
- Length: 53:34
- Label: Independent
- Producer: Tony Alany

Angela Aki chronology
These Words (2000)	One (2005)

These Words is the debut album of Japanese singer Angela Aki, released on January 4, 2000. The album is completely in English and is her only album to date released in the United States. Tony Alany is credited with working on and producing the album. Alany and Aki recorded the album in a recording studio located in a back room of a coffee house in Vienna, Virginia called Jam'n Java. Following production of the album, Tony Alany and Aki were married.

== Track listing ==
No.	Title	Length
1.	"I'll Fall"	4:16
2.	"We Dance"	4:51
3.	"100 Ways"	4:11
4.	"April Sun"	5:24
5.	"Funny Dreamers"	3:49
6.	"Roshni's Song"	4:31
7.	"Perfectly Happy There"	4:52
8.	"Your Voice"	4:31
9.	"Peace To"	4:46
10.	"Magic"	11:56*
11.	"Hidden Track (Come Home to Me)"	11:56*

* Length is combined length of Magic and Come Home to Me as both are contained on the same track (Track 10).
