= Kokuhaku (Angela Aki song) =

Single by Angela Aki

from the album BLUE
- Released: July 11, 2012 (Japan)
- Genre: J-pop
- Length: 16:28 (Limited Edition); 14:55 (Standard Edition)
- Label: Sony Music Japan
- Songwriter: Angela Aki

Angela Aki singles chronology
"Kagayaku Hito" (2009)	"Kokuhaku" (2012)

"Kokuhaku" (告白, Confession) is the twelfth single by Japanese singer Angela Aki, released on July 11, 2012, in two editions, standard and limited. The song was used as the second ending theme song in the Japanese anime Space Brothers (宇宙兄弟/Uchū Kyōdai). Aki was inspired by Russian-American singer Regina Spektor when writing this song.

She performed the track at Music Japan.

== Track listing ==
=== CD ===
All tracks are written by Angela Aki.

No.	Title	Arranger(s)	Length
1.	"Kokuhaku (告白/Confession)"	Angela Aki, Yoshinori Abe, Eiji "Q" Makino	4:23
2.	"Kokuhaku [Ishino Takkyū Remix]"	Ishino Takkyū	6:22
3.	"Uchuu (宇宙/Space) [80KIDZ Remix]"	80KIDZ	4:08

Limited Edition Bonus Track

No.	Title	Length
4.	"Kokuhaku [Anime Version]"	1:28

=== DVD ===
No.	Title	Length
1.	"HOME SWEET HOME "5 YEARS" ～Best Hits and All Requests～" (Concert video)
2.	"My Keys to Awa ~Piano and Vocal Recital Concert in Asti Tokushima~ Special Trailer" (Concert trailer)

== Charts ==
Chart	Peak position
Oricon Weekly Singles Chart	40

== Release history ==
Country	Date	Edition	Catalogue	Label
Japan	July 11, 2012	Standard	ESCL-3937	Sony Music Japan
Japan	July 11, 2012	Limited	ESCL-3935	Sony Music Japan
