= Home (Angela Aki song) =

Single by Angela Aki

from the album Home
- Released: September 14, 2005 (Japan)
- Recorded: 2005
- Genre: J-pop
- Length: 11:57
- Label: Sony Music Japan
- Songwriter: Angela Aki
- Producer: Matsuoka Motoki

Angela Aki singles chronology
"Home" (2005)	"Kokoro no Senshi" (2006)

"Home" is the first major label single by Japanese singer Angela Aki. It was released on September 14, 2005, and reached number 38 on the Oricon Charts.

== Track listing ==
CD
No.	Title	Writer(s)	Arranger(s)	Length
1.	"Home"	Angela Aki	Angela Aki, Motoki Matsuoka	4:59
2.	"Kiseki (奇跡)"	Angela Aki	Angela Aki, Motoki Matsuoka	3:32
3.	"Will You Dance" (Janis Ian cover)	Janis Ian, Angela Aki (Japanese lyrics)	Angela Aki, Motoki Matsuoka	3:26

== Charts ==
Release	Chart	Peak position	Sales total	Chart run
September 14, 2005	Oricon Singles Chart	38		
