= Tegami (Haikei Jūgo no Kimi e) =

"Tegami (Haikei Jūgo no Kimi e) (手紙 ～拝啓 十五の君へ～, Letter: Greetings to a 15 Year Old)"

Single by Angela Aki

from the album Answer
- Released: September 17, 2008 (Japan)
- Genre: J-pop
- Length: 19:24
- Label: Sony Music Japan
- Songwriter: Angela Aki

Angela Aki singles chronology
"Tashika ni" (2007)	"Tegami (Haikei Jūgo no Kimi e) (手紙 ～拝啓 十五の君へ～, Letter: Greetings to a 15 Year Old)" (2008)	"Ai no Kisetsu" (2009)

"Tegami (Haikei Jūgo no Kimi e)" (手紙 ～拝啓 十五の君へ～; "Letter: Greetings to a 15 Year Old") is the eighth Japanese single by Angela Aki and was released on September 17, 2008. It was broadcast in a music program Minna no Uta in August 2008 with some re-runs. The song reached number three on the Oricon Weekly Charts, selling more than 200,000 copies. It was certified Million for downloads in 2016 by the RIAJ. The song is performed in the anime movie Colorful.

The song was ranked at 25 on "Billboard Japan Hot 100 Songs" chart.

The B-side "Still Fighting It" is a Japanese language cover of Ben Folds' song of the same name. Aki herself wrote the Japanese version's lyrics. Folds himself, by chance, heard Aki cover the song at the 2008 Fuji Rock Festival. He was impressed, and met with Aki. Due to this, they collaborated on the song "Black Glasses", on Aki's next album, Answer.

== Choir versions ==
The song is a self-cover of the choir song Angela originally wrote upon the request of the national public broadcaster NHK as the compulsory song in the 75th NHK National School Music Contest in 2008, Junior High School (12–15 years old) Division. Arranged by Hiroaki Takaha, the girls' and mixed demonstration choirs version were broadcast in March 2008, and was performed on the film Have a Song on Your Lips in 2015.

== Track listing ==
CD
No.	Title	Writer(s)	Arranger(s)	Length
1.	"Tegami (Haikei Jūgo no Kimi e) (手紙 ～拝啓 十五の君へ～; Letter ~Greetings to a 15 Year Old~)"	Angela Aki	Angela Aki	5:15
2.	"Final Destination"	Angela Aki	Angela Aki	4:40
3.	"Still Fighting It" (Ben Folds cover)	Ben Folds, Angela Aki (Japanese lyrics)	Angela Aki	4:20
4.	"Tegami (Haikei Jūgo no Kimi e)" (Strings Version)	Angela Aki	Angela Aki, Strings arranged by Shin Kono	5:09

DVD
No.	Title	Length
1.	"Tegami (Haikei Jūgo no Kimi e)" (music video &making video)
2.	"Concert Tour 2007-2008: TODAY" (premiere movie)

== Charts (Japan) ==
Release	Oricon Albums Chart	Peak position	Debut sales (copies)	Sales total (copies)	Chart run
September 17, 2008	Daily Chart (first day)	#3	4,308	235,782*	69 weeks
September 17, 2008	Weekly Chart	#3	31,419	235,782*	69 weeks
September 17, 2008	Monthly Chart (October)	#9	68,769	235,782*	69 weeks
September 17, 2008	Yearly Chart (2008)	#45	139,755	235,782*	69 weeks
September 17, 2008	Yearly Chart (2009)	#71	83,270	235,782*	69 weeks

== Cover versions ==
This song has also been sung by Taiwanese singer Rene Liu under the title "Strive On: To My 15 Years Old Self (Chinese: 繼續~給十五歲的自己~). Chinese singer Chen Ming (陈明) under the title Letter (信), Bibi Zhou under the title Write to Future Myself (写给未来的自己), Hong Kong singer Sherman Chung under the title Letter to Myself (給自己的信) and the 15-year-old Japanese singer and Morning Musume member Mei Yamazaki.
