= Tashika ni =

"Tashika ni (たしかに, Surely)"

Single by Angela Aki

from the album Today
- Released: July 11, 2007 (Japan)
- Genre: J-pop
- Length: 8:47
- Label: Sony Music Japan
- Songwriter: Angela Aki

Angela Aki singles chronology
"Kodoku no Kakera" (2007)	"Tashika ni (たしかに, Surely)" (2007)	"Tegami (Haikei Jūgo no Kimi e)" (2008)

"Tashika ni (たしかに, Surely)" is the seventh single by Japanese singer Angela Aki. It was released on July 11, 2007. It was featured as the "LISMO" CM song.

== Track listing ==
All tracks are written by Angela Aki, arranged by Seiji Kameda.

No.	Title	Length
1.	"Tashika ni (たしかに, Surely)"	4:58
2.	"Tashika ni (たしかに, Surely)" (piano version)	3:49

== Live performances ==
- Music Station
