= This Love (Angela Aki song) =

Single by Angela Aki

from the album Home
- Released: May 31, 2006 (Japan)
- Recorded: 2006
- Genre: J-pop
- Length: 14:07
- Label: Sony Music Japan
- Songwriter: Angela Aki

Angela Aki singles chronology
"Kiss Me Good-Bye" (2006)	"This Love" (2006)	"Sakura iro" (2007)

"This Love" is the fourth single by Japanese singer Angela Aki, and was the third ending theme song of Blood+. The single was released on May 31, 2006, and made its debut on the Oricon Weekly Charts at number six.

== Track listing ==
CD
No.	Title	Writer(s)	Arranger(s)	Length
1.	"This Love"	Angela Aki	Angela Aki, Motoki Matsuoka	4:46
2.	"Jiyū no Ashiato (自由の足跡, Footprints of freedom)"	Angela Aki	Angela Aki, Motoki Matsuoka	5:27
3.	"Kiss From A Rose" (Kiss from a Rose Cover)	Seal, Angela Aki (Japanese lyrics)	Angela Aki, Motoki Matsuoka	3:54

+DVD (First Press Limited Edition)
No.	Title	Length
1.	"This Love" (Music video)

== Live performances ==
- Music Station Super Live

== Charts ==
Release	Chart	Peak position	Sales total
May 31, 2006	Oricon Weekly Singles Chart	6	46,962
May 31, 2006	Oricon Daily Singles Chart	5	
May 31, 2006	Oricon Ninki Chart	3	
