= Home (Angela Aki album) =

Studio album by Angela Aki
- Released: June 14, 2006 (Japan)
- Genre: J-pop
- Length: 61:45
- Label: Sony Music Japan

Angela Aki chronology
One (2005)	Home (2006)	Today (2007)

Singles from Home
- 1. "Home"; 2. "Kokoro no Senshi"; 3. "Kiss Me Good-Bye"; 4. "This Love"

Home is the first major-label album from Angela Aki. The album includes the songs from the singles released over the monthly period. In addition to the normal version of the album, a limited edition was also released. A special song entitled "Rain" from her previous mini album One is also featured. The album has charted at #2 on the Oricon Charts, selling well over 121,000 copies in its first week.

== Track listing ==
No.	Title	Length
1.	"Kiss Me Good-Bye"	5:13
2.	"Love Is Over Now"	4:49
3.	"Kokoro no Senshi (心の戦士, Warrior of the Heart)"	5:11
4.	"Music"	4:53
5.	"This Love"	4:46
6.	"Onegai (お願い, Wishes)"	2:25
7.	"Uchū (宇宙, Universe)"	4:51
8.	"Rain"	3:57
9.	"Kiseki (奇跡, Miracle)"	3:32
10.	"Ōgesa ni 'Aishiteru' (大袈裟に「愛してる」, Grandly Saying 'I Love You')"	5:51
11.	"Hallelujah (ハレルヤ)"	4:45
12.	"Home"	4:59
13.	"Your Love Song"	6:06

(+DVD)(First Press Limited Edition)
No.	Title	Length
1.	"Home Music Video"
2.	"Kokoro no Senshi (心の戦士, Warrior of the Heart) Music Video"
3.	"Kiss Me Good-Bye Music Video (Final Fantasy XII + Angela Aki Compilation Video)"
4.	"This Love Music Video"
5.	"Final Fantasy XII Perfected Original Movie ~Final Edition~"
6.	"This Love (Live/2006.5.7 Blood+ Anime Fest.)"

== Charts ==
Oricon Sales chart (Japan)

Release	Chart	Peak position	Sales total
June 14, 2006	Oricon Daily Albums Chart	2	553,400
June 14, 2006	Oricon Weekly Albums Chart	2	553,400

== Release history ==
Region	Date	Format	Distributing label	Catalogue codes
Japan	June 14, 2006	CD, CD/DVD, digital download	Sony	ESCL-2850, ESCL-2848~9
Japan	July 1, 2006	Rental CD	Sony	ESCL-2850
Taiwan	August 25, 2006	CD	Sony	88697006442
Singapore	January 23, 2007	CD	Sony	88697006442
South Korea	May 8, 2007	CD, digital download	Sony	2347371
Hong Kong	December 14, 2007	CD	Sony	88697006442
