= Kokoro no Senshi =

2006 single by Angela Aki

"心の戦士" "Kokoro No Senshi" / "Heart of the Warrior""

Single by Angela Aki

from the album Home
- Released: January 18, 2006 (Japan)
- Recorded: 2006
- Genre: J-Pop
- Length: 17:40
- Label: Sony Music Japan
- Songwriter: Angela Aki
- Producer: Matsuoka Motoki

Angela Aki singles chronology
"Home" (2005)	"心の戦士" "Kokoro No Senshi" / "Heart of the Warrior"" (2006)	"Kiss Me Good-Bye" (2006)

"Kokoro no Senshi" (心の戦士) is the second single by Japanese singer Angela Aki. It was released on January 18, 2006, reached number 9 on the Oricon Daily Charts, and number 13 on the Weekly Chart. It features the Final Fantasy VIII theme song "Eyes on Me" by Faye Wong and "Today", The Smashing Pumpkins cover.

In an Excite Japan interview, Aki reports composer Nobuo Uematsu as saying her version 'shed light on "Eyes on Me"'.

== Track listing ==
CD
No.	Title	Lyrics	Music	Arranger(s)	Length
1.	"Kokoro no Senshi (心の戦士, Warrior of the heart)"	Angela Aki	Angela Aki	Angela Aki, Motoki Matsuoka	5:11
2.	"Sora wa Itsumo Naite Iru (空はいつも泣いている)"	Angela Aki	Angela Aki	Angela Aki, Motoki Matsuoka	3:12
3.	"Today" (The Smashing Pumpkins' cover)	William Patrick Corgan, Angela Aki (Japanese lyrics)	William Patrick Corgan	Angela Aki, Motoki Matsuoka	3:54
4.	"Eyes On Me -featured in FINAL FANTASY VIII-" (bonus track)	Kazumi Someya	Nobuo Uematsu	Angela Aki, Motoki Matsuoka	4:31

DVD
No.	Title	Length
1.	"Kokoro no Senshi" (Music video)
2.	"Final Fantasy VIII Premier movie featuring Kiss Me Good-Bye"

== Charts ==
Release	Chart	Peak position	Sales total	Chart run
January 18, 2006	Oricon Daily Singles Chart	9		
January 18, 2006	Oricon Weekly Singles Chart	13	12,645	17 Weeks
