= Kagayaku Hito =

Single by Angela Aki

from the album Life
- Released: April 14, 2010 (Japan)
- Genre: J-pop
- Length: 18:03
- Label: Sony Music Japan
- Songwriter: Angela Aki

Angela Aki singles chronology
"Ai no Kisetsu" (2009)	"Kagayaku Hito" (2010)

"Kagayaku Hito (輝く人, Shining One)" is the tenth single by Japanese singer Angela Aki, released on April 14, 2010. It varies in style from her previous singles, being the first to feature Aki playing guitar, rather than her normal prominent piano arrangements.

== Track listing ==
All tracks are written by Angela Aki.

CD
No.	Title	Arranger(s)	Length
1.	"Kagayaku Hito (輝く人, Shining One)"	Angela Aki	5:20
2.	"The Chase"	Yuji Okiyama, Masayuki Muraishi	4:17
3.	"Without You"	Angela Aki	3:12
4.	"Tegami (Haikei Jūgo no Kimi e) (手紙 ～拝啓 十五の君へ～ (合唱バージョン), Letter: Greetings to a 15 Year Old (Chorus Version))"	Angela Aki, Hiroaki Takaha (chorus arrangement)	5:14

DVD
No.	Title	Length
1.	"Kagayaku Hito (輝く人, Shining One)" (Music video)
2.	"Kagayaku Hito (輝く人, Shining One)" (Making Video)
3.	"Premiere documentary film Answer Tour: 150,000 Letters (ANSWERツアー ～１５万人の『手紙』～)"

== Charts ==
Release	Oricon Albums Chart	Peak position	Debut sales (copies)	Sales total (copies)	Chart run
April 14, 2010	Daily Chart (third day)	#4	-	18.298	5 weeks
April 14, 2010	Weekly Chart	#6	10,083	18.298	5 weeks
