= Kiss Me Good-Bye =

"Kiss Me Good-bye"

Single by Angela Aki

from the album Home
- Released: March 15, 2006
- Recorded: 2005
- Genre: J-pop
- Length: 19:59 (Japan); 19:41 (U.S.)
- Label: Sony Music Japan; Tofu Records (U.S.)
- Songwriters: Nobuo Uematsu, Angela Aki
- Producer: Motoki Matsuoka

Angela Aki singles chronology
"Kokoro no Senshi" (2006)	"Kiss Me Good-bye" (2006)	"This Love" (2006)

"Kiss Me Good-Bye" is the third single by Japanese singer Angela Aki, and is the theme song of Final Fantasy XII. It was written by Aki, composed by Nobuo Uematsu and arranged by Kenichiro Fukui. Although the title version of the single is in Japanese, the version included in the game is sung in English. The single was released on March 15, 2006. The song peaked at number six on the Oricon charts.

The same year on May 16, Aki released an English version of the single as a digital single under the title "Kiss Me Good-Bye [EP]" in North America through Tofu Records.

== Track listing ==
CD: Japanese version
No.	Title	Lyrics	Music	Arranger(s)	Length
1.	"Kiss Me Good-Bye" (Japanese version)	Angela Aki	Nobuo Uematsu	Angela Aki, Motoki Matsuoka	5:13
2.	"Santa Fé"	Angela Aki	Angela Aki	Angela Aki, Motoki Matsuoka	4:59
3.	"Aoi Kage (青い影)" (A Whiter Shade of Pale Cover)	Keith Reid	Gary Brooker, Matthew Fisher	Angela Aki, Motoki Matsuoka	4:49
4.	"Kiss Me Good-Bye -Featured in Final Fantasy XII-" (Bonus track)	Angela Aki	Nobuo Uematsu	Kenichiro Fukui	4:58

CD: North American version
No.	Title	Lyrics	Music	Arranger(s)	Length
1.	"Kiss Me Good-Bye"				4:58
2.	"Santa Fé"				4:59
3.	"Eyes On Me"	Kazumi Someya	Nobuo Uematsu	Motoki Matsuoka, Angela Aki	4:31
4.	"Kiss Me Good-Bye" (Japanese version)				5:13

DVD
No.	Title	Length
1.	"Kiss Me Good-Bye" (Final Fantasy XII + Angela Aki Collaboration Music Video)

== Charts ==
Kiss Me Good-bye - Oricon sales chart (Japan)

Release	Chart	Peak position	Sales total	Chart run
March 15, 2006	Oricon Daily Singles Chart	4		
March 15, 2006	Oricon Weekly Singles Chart	6	27,566	18 weeks

== Release history ==
Country	Release date	Format	Label	Length
Japan	March 15, 2006	CD single	Sony Music Japan	19:59
United States	May 16, 2006	Digital single	Tofu Records	19:41

== See also ==
- Music of Final Fantasy XII
