= Angela Aki =

Japanese pop singer and songwriter

- アンジェラ・アキ
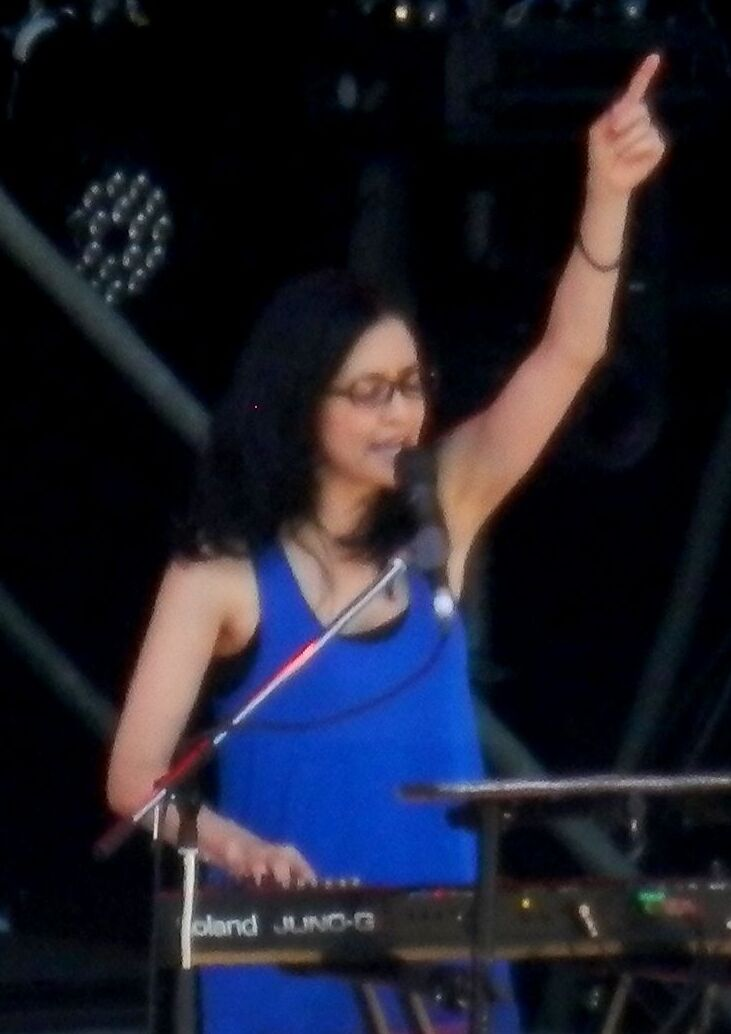
- Aki at Join Alive rock festival in Iwamizawa, Hokkaido, 2013
- Born: Kiyomi Angela Aki; September 15, 1977 (age 49); Itano, Tokushima, Japan
- Occupations: Singer; Songwriter; Pianist
- Years active: 1999–present
- Height: 166 cm (5 ft 5 in)
- Children: 1
- Musical career
- Genres: Pop; jazz
- Instruments: Vocals; Piano; Guitar
- Labels: Sony Music Japan; Tofu Records
- Website: www.angela-aki.com

Kiyomi Angela Aki (安藝 聖世美 アンジェラ, Aki Kiyomi Anjera; born September 15, 1977) is a Japanese pop singer, songwriter and pianist.

== Biography ==
=== Early life ===
Aki was born in the small town of Itano in Tokushima Prefecture, in the mostly rural island of Shikoku. Her mother is Italian American and her father is Japanese.

Aki began to take piano lessons when she was three years old. She lived in Tokushima through sixth grade and spent her junior high school days in Okayama. She has admitted that growing up in rural Japan proved very difficult, as she was bullied and she turned to the piano as an escape from the isolation she felt. She grew up listening to a mix of enka, The Carpenters and The Bee Gees.

Aki moved to Hawaii when she was fifteen years old and attended the Hawaii Preparatory Academy, but transferred to and graduated from Iolani School. She speaks English and Japanese. She was immersed in music there for four years. She graduated from George Washington University in Washington, D.C., and majored in political science.

=== Personal life ===
Angela's first marriage was to an engineer, producer and artist Tony Alany, who co-produced her first album These Words in Vienna, Virginia, USA. On March 9, 2007, Aki announced that she had married Japanese A&R director and publisher Taro Hamano, and made public that she had been briefly married previously and got divorced. In September 2011, she announced that she was pregnant. In February 2012, she announced that she had given birth to her first child, a baby boy.

She is good friends with J-Pop star Yuna Ito. The singers attended the same Japanese language school.

Janis Ian is her mentor and friend.

After putting her music career on hiatus in 2014, Aki attended University of Southern California at the Thornton School of Music until 2016. After, she moved with her husband and son to Nashville. She also took classes at Berklee College of Music.

On October 1, 2025, she announced that she divorced Taro Hamano.

== Career ==
=== Beginnings ===
In 1997 Aki, aged 20, went to a Sarah McLachlan concert, and felt that she wanted to go into the music world, deciding to become a singer-songwriter. In 2000, she released an indie album in the United States, called These Words. After graduation from university, she found a job in Washington, D.C. and worked as a secretary. She could not give up her dream of being a singer, however, and quit her job in 2001. She worked as a waitress for 2 dollars 13 cents during the day, and she played songs at night at a nightclub. Aki briefly married her first album's engineer in Vienna, Virginia, USA. In 2002, she composed two tracks for "Let It Fall" by Dianne Eclar, a teenage pop singer from the Philippines.

=== Debut in Japan ===
After producing commercial music for several Japanese companies, including one for milk product Yakult which was sung by US Jazz vocalist Jimmy Scott, she decided to move back to Japan. On September 27, 2003, Aki saw Shiina Ringo's concert in Nippon Budokan Hall, and promised herself she would perform at the same place within three years, even though she was unheard of, had not yet been offered a contract with any record label, nor had she made an album or major debut. She performed live in many small venues and bars in Tokyo while working as a waitress in a Chinese restaurant, wrote 100 or more songs, and also made several demo CDs. In 2005, she released an independent mini-album under Virgo Music entitled "One," which was the #1 selling indie album of 2005. This alerted Nobuo Uematsu to her music, and he asked her to write lyrics and perform the theme song for Final Fantasy XII, "Kiss Me Good-Bye".

She contracted with Epic Records and made her major debut with the single "HOME" in September, 2005. The album sold over half a million copies and reached #2 on the Oricon charts.

On December 26, 2006, she held a concert in Nippon Budokan, making history there as the first artist to ever perform in the famous venue solo (with just her piano) -- no backup singers, band or opening act.

=== Reaching an English audience (2006–2007) ===
In May 2006, Angela signed with Tofu Records in order to release English singles and albums. Her first release with Tofu was "Kiss Me Good-Bye" as a digital single in the US, with a slightly altered track list. Later that month she performed the Final Fantasy XII theme song, "Kiss Me Good-Bye" at the premiere PLAY! A Video Game Symphony concert in Chicago on May 27, 2006. With orchestral backup, she played piano and sang the English lyrics, which she had written herself. She also performed a cover version of Faye Wong's "Eyes On Me", the theme song of Final Fantasy VIII, with her piano accompaniment.

In 2007 Aki's second major-label album, Today, reached #1.

=== 2009–2014 ===
In February 2009, Aki released her third full album in Japan, Answer — the first she produced entirely by herself.

Angela Aki was chosen to sing Bob Dylan's "Knockin' on Heaven's Door" with her original Japanese lyrics for the movie Heaven's Door, and was chosen to write and perform the theme song titled “Ai no Kisetsu” for the NHK morning drama Tsubasa broadcast from March 30, 2009.

In September 2010, Aki released her fourth full album in Japan, Life, and then in September 2011 released her fifth full album White.

Songbook, a cover album by Aki, was released on January 11, 2012.

BLUE was released as Aki's 7th full Japanese studio album on July 18, 2012, along with the single from the same album, "Confession" (告白), released July 11, 2012.

On March 5, 2014, Tapestry of Songs: The Best of Angela Aki was released in two versions, the standard version consisting of tracks of singles released since 2005 (通常盤 ESCL-4170), and a two disc version (初回生産限定盤 ESCL-30010), which added songs Aki considered her favourites on the second disc.

=== Music hiatus and songwriting for other artists (2014–2023) ===
In 2014, Aki announced that she would be putting her music career on hold while she went to America to study music as she prepared herself to take on the role of musical director for a Broadway project being undertaken by a friend. Aki's last performance before her hiatus was the final stop for Angela Aki Concert Tour 2014 Tapestry of Songs: The Best of Angela Aki at Budokan, which was recorded and released as a concert film.

After the end of her tour, Aki and her family moved to Los Angeles, California to attend University of Southern California for two years. Following the end of her program, she enrolled in courses at Berklee College of Music. Following the end of her time at USC, she and her family moved again to Nashville, Tennessee.

During this time, Aki began writing music for projects and other artists. In 2016, she wrote three original songs for the musical Out of Shadowland at Tokyo DisneySea. The same year, she composed a song for Masayuki Suzuki.

In 2017, she wrote and produced for May J.

In 2022, she wrote, composed, and produced "Canary Song" (カナリアの歌) for J-pop singer Emiko Suzuki.

=== Musical composition and return to music activities (2023–present) ===
In November 2023, Aki announced via her Instagram and X accounts that she would be resuming her activities in Japan with the release of "Here and There in This World" (この世界のあちこちに) in February 2024. The song is the lead single from the musical adaptation of Fumiyo Kouno's In This Corner of the World, for which Aki composed all of the music. The musical premiered in May 2024 and toured from June to July across Japan, with a final stop in Hiroshima. The musical starred Natsumi Kon, Sakurako Ohara, Naoto Kaihō, Ryota Murai, Aya Hirano, Reika Sakurai, and Kei Otozuki. Ahead of the tour, Aki released her version of the music from In This Corner of the World titled Angela Aki Sings Kono Sekai no Katasumi ni, which featured two duets with Naoto Kaihō, on April 24, 2024.

On March 3, 2025, Aki announced that she was working on an original studio album. On, May 20, 2025, she released a recording documentary movie of the first single, Pledge, which she described as a love song to herself. In October 2025, she announced her album will be released in February 2026.

Aki was also in charge of composition for the 2025 thriller film Eugene the Marine.

== Discography ==
Studio albums

- These Words (2001)
- Home (2006)
- Today (2007)
- Answer (2009)
- Life (2010)
- White (2011)
- Blue (2012)
- Angela Aki Sings Kono Sekai no Katasumi ni (2024)
- Shadow Work (2026)
