= Sledge (disambiguation) =

A sledge, or sled, is a vehicle with runners for sliding.

Sledge may also refer to:

== Places ==
- Sledge, Mississippi, United States
- Sledge Island, Alaska, USA

== People ==
- Sledge (surname)

== Arts, entertainment, and media ==
Fictional entities

- Sledge (Transformers), a fictional character from the Transformers franchise
- Sledge (Power Rangers), a fictional character from the Power Rangers franchise
- Sledge (DC Comics), a fictional character from DC Comics

Groups

- Sister Sledge, an American musical group from Philadelphia

== Other uses ==
- Sledgehammer, a large hammer

== See also ==
- SLED (disambiguation)
- Sledging (disambiguation)
- Sleigh (disambiguation)
