= Sledge (surname) =

Sledge is a surname. Notable people with the surname include:

- Alonzo Sledge (1854–1918), American politician
- Bryan Sledge (born 1984), American rapper
- Eugene Sledge (1923–2001), U.S. Marine, university professor, and author
- James Scott Sledge, Chief Copyright Royalty Judge of the American Copyright Royalty Board
- Joni Sledge (1956–2017), American singer, member of Sister Sledge
- Joseph Sledge (1942–2020), American wrongly imprisoned prisoner
- Kathy Sledge (born 1959), American singer–songwriter and producer, member of Sister Sledge
- Mildred Sledge, American screenwriter
- Percy Sledge (1940–2015), American singer
- Richard Sledge (born 1930), British retired Anglican priest
- Robert Sledge (born 1968), American double-bassist
- Seandrea Sledge (stage name Dreezy, born 1994), American rapper, singer, songwriter
- Terrmel Sledge (born 1977), American former professional baseball player

== See also ==
- Sister Sledge, American musical vocal group
