= 976 (disambiguation) =

976 may refer to:

- 976 (number), a number in the 900s range

== Time ==
- AD 976, a year in the first millennium of the Common Era
- 976 BC, a year in the first millennium Before Common Era
- 9/76, September 1976
- 97/6, June 1997

== Places ==
- 976 Benjamina (1922 LU), a main-belt asteroid, the 976th asteroid registered
- highway 976, any of several roads

== People ==
- Guantanamo captive 976

== Telephony ==
- 976 telephone numbers, phone numbers using local exchange code 976 in North America, which are additional charge telephone calls
- +976, the international dialing code for Mongolia

== Military ==
Ships pennant number 976

- German submarine U-976, a WWII submarine
- ROCS Heng Yang (DDG-976), a Cold War era Taiwanese destroyer
- ROKS Munmu the Great (DDH-976), a 21st-century South Korean destroyer
- USS Merrill (DD-976), a Cold War era U.S. Navy destroyer
- USS LST-976, a WWII U.S. Navy landingship for tanks that was converted into a repair ship
- USS LCI(L)-976, a WWII U.S. Navy landingship for infantry

== Legislation ==
- 2019 Washington Initiative 976, a ballot initiative in the U.S. state of Washington
- H.R. 976, a U.S. federal bill to reauthorize the Children's Health Insurance Program, 2007
- United Nations Security Council Resolution 976, for a peacekeeping force in Angola, 1995

== Other uses ==
- 976 (New Jersey bus)
- 976-EVIL, a horror movie

== See also ==
- BWV 976, J.S.Bach concerto
- United Airlines Flight 976, a 1995 flight that resulted in a case of extreme air rage
