= Sleigh (surname) =

Sleigh is a surname. It is sometimes pronounced "slee". Notable people with the surname include:

- Arthur B. Sleigh (1821–1869), founder of the British newspaper The Daily Telegraph
- Bernard Sleigh (1872–1954), English artist
- Dan Sleigh (born 1938), South African novelist
- Harold Sleigh (1867–1933), Australian shipowner and founder of Golden Fleece petroleum business
- Julian Sleigh (1927–2013), South African Christian Community priest and author
- Sylvia Sleigh (born 1935), American realist painter
- Tom Sleigh, American poet, dramatist, essayist and academic
- Violet Sleigh (born 1935), the first Miss Malaysia, and World War II prisoner of war
- William Campbell Sleigh (1818–1887), English lawyer and politician

== See also ==
- Sleigher (surname)
- Slay (disambiguation)
