= Sleigher =

Sleigher is a surname. Notable people with the name include:

- Louis Sleigher (born 1958), Canadian ice hockey player
- Pierre-Luc Sleigher (born 1982), Canadian ice hockey player

== See also ==
- Sleigher (album), a 2024 Christmas album by Ben Folds
- Slayer (disambiguation)
- Sleigh (disambiguation)
