= Sleigh (disambiguation) =

A sleigh is a vehicle with runners for sliding.

Sleigh may also refer to:

- Bobsleigh
- Sleigh (surname)

== See also ==
- Slay (disambiguation)
- SLED (disambiguation)
- Sledge (disambiguation)
