= Slayer (disambiguation) =

Slayer is an American thrash metal band.

Slayer or Slayers may also refer to:

- Slayer, an archaic term for murderer
  - Slayer rule, a doctrine prohibiting a murderer to inherit from the victim

== People ==
- SlayerS 'BoxeR', in-game name of StarCraft player Lim Yo-hwan

== Film and TV ==
- The Slayer, a 1982 horror film
- Slayer (film), a 2006 film
- Slayers (film), a 2022 American horror film
- Slayer (Buffy the Vampire Slayer), a type of female character, charged with fighting vampires and demons, in the TV series and franchise Buffy the Vampire Slayer

== Books and comics ==
- Slayers, a Japanese fantasy light novel and media franchise
- Slayers: A Buffyverse Story, an audiobook written and directed by Amber Benson and Christopher Golden
- Slayer, a character in The Wheel of Time

== Games ==
- Slayer (video game), a horizontally scrolling shooter game released in 1988
- Slayer (Guilty Gear), a video game character from the fighting game series Guilty Gear
- Slayer, a character class or skill in various role-playing games
- Advanced Dungeons & Dragons: Slayer, a 1994 role-playing video game for the 3DO
- Slayers (video game), a video game based on the Slayers light novel series
- Slayers (role-playing game), a 2020 tabletop role-playing game
- Slayers X: Terminal Aftermath: Vengance of the Slayer, a 2023 first-person shooter
- Lina the Slayer, a heroine in the video game Dota 2

== Music ==
- S.A. Slayer, formerly Slayer, an American heavy metal band
- "Slayers", a 1998 song from the Vampires film soundtrack
- "Slayers", a 2009 song from the Gamer film soundtrack
- Slayr, rapper and producer

== Other uses ==
- Washington D.C. Slayers, an American rugby league team

== See also ==
- Kinslayer (disambiguation), murderer of own family/kin
- Dragonslayer
- Slay (disambiguation)
- S-layer
