= Sledd =

Sledd may refer to

== Places ==
- Sledd, Missouri, an unincorporated community in Pike County, United States
- Sledd Hall in the University of Florida, United States

== People ==
- Sledd of Essex, 6th century King of Essex
- Andrew Sledd (1870–1939), American theologian
- Antonio J. "Tony" Sledd (1982–2002), U.S. Marine killed in the Faylaka Island attack
- William Sledd (born 1983), American video blogger

== See also ==
- SLED (disambiguation)
