= Sled (disambiguation) =

A sled is a land vehicle that slides on two or more runners.

Sled or SLED may also refer to:

== People ==
- Sled Allen (1886–1959), American baseball player
- Sled Reynolds (born 1950), American animal trainer

== Places ==
- Sled Lake, Saskatchewan, Canada
- Sled Island, Canada

== Technology ==
- SUSE Linux Enterprise Desktop, an operating system
- Superluminescent diode, a semiconductor light source
- Single large expensive disk, in contrast with a redundant array of inexpensive disks (RAID)

== Other uses ==
- Crosscut sled, a table saw accessory
- State, local and education, for example in relation to government procurement in the United States
- South Carolina Law Enforcement Division, US

== See also ==
- Sledd (disambiguation)
- Sleigh (disambiguation)
- Sledge (disambiguation)
