= September 1976 =

Month of 1976

<<	September 1976					>>
Su	Mo	Tu	We	Th	Fr	Sa
			1	2	3	4
5	6	7	8	9	10	11
12	13	14	15	16	17	18
19	20	21	22	23	24	25
26	27	28	29	30

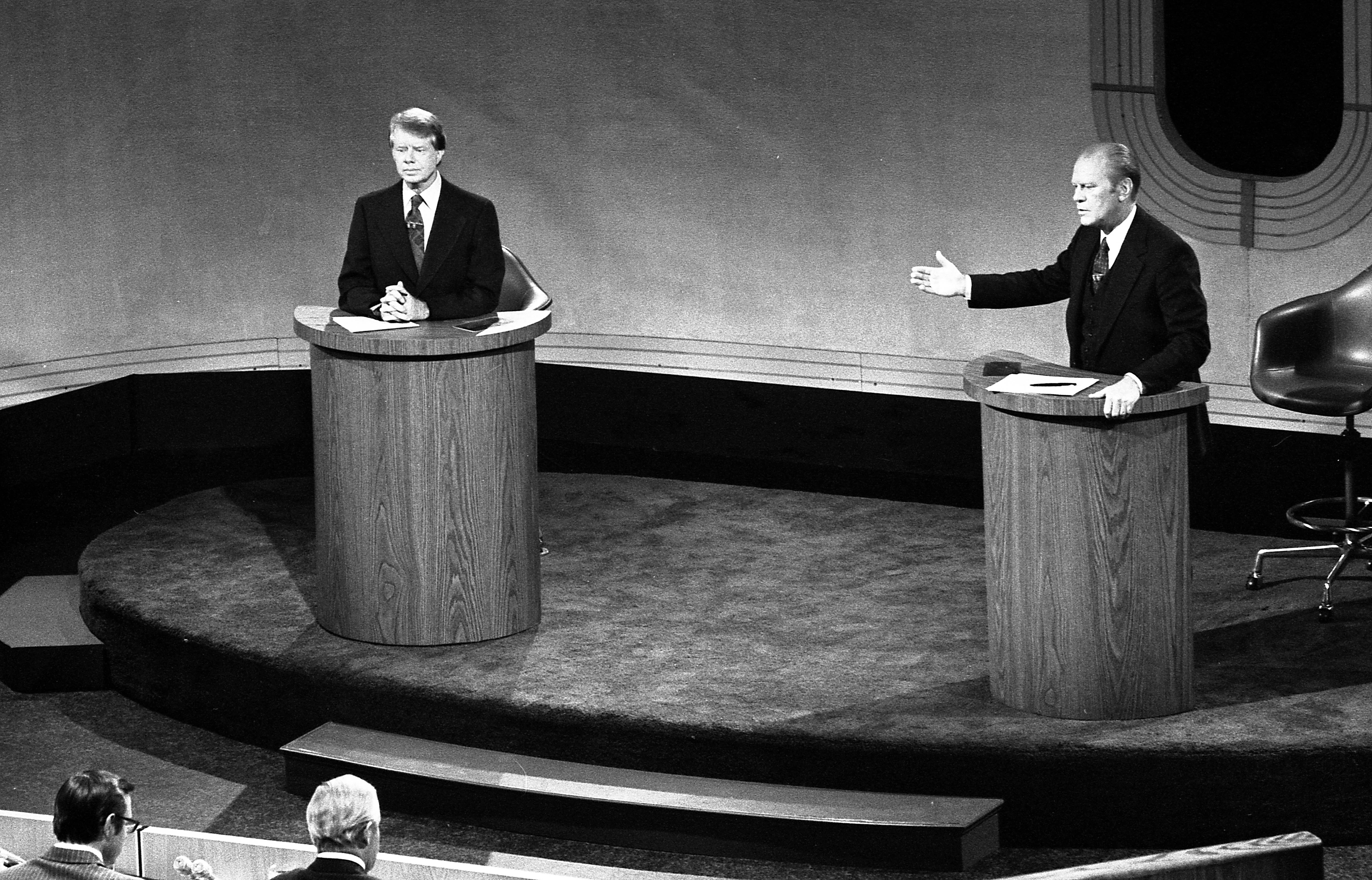
September 23, 1976: Democratic candidate Jimmy Carter and U.S. President Gerald Ford appear in first U.S. presidential debate in 16 years

September 9, 1976: Chairman Mao Zedong, absolute ruler of the People's Republic of China, dies after 27 years in power.

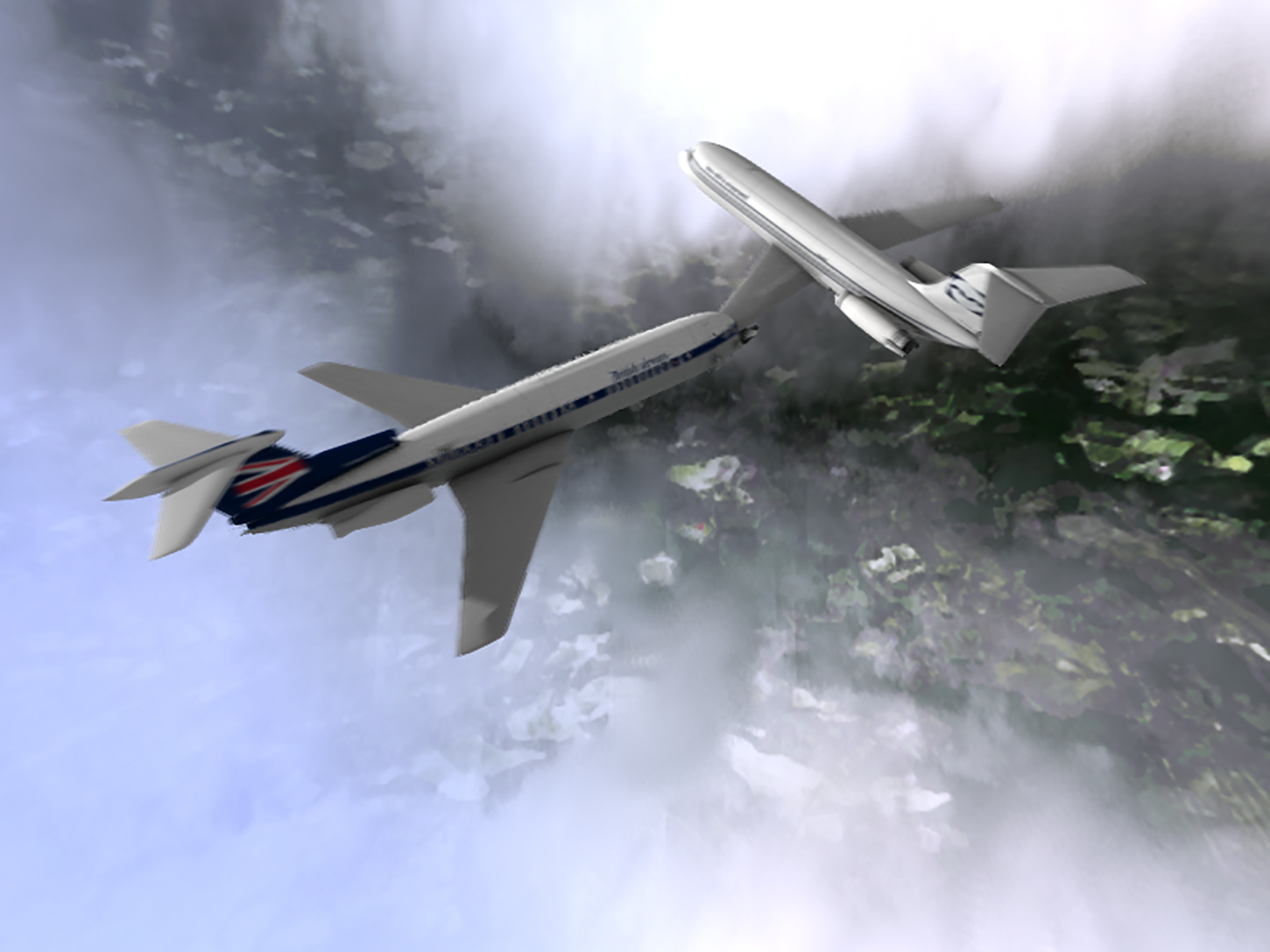
September 10, 1976: Midair collision of British and Yugoslavian airliners kills 176 people (artist's rendition)

The following events happened in September 1976.

== September 1, 1976 (Wednesday) ==
- The proposed Forty-second Amendment of the Constitution of India was introduced to give a legal basis for the dictatorial powers of Prime Minister Indira Gandhi by repealing many of the democratic provisions of the original constitution. The bill would be passed by the Lok Sabha on November 2, 1976, and by the Rajya Sabha on November 11, with assent given on December 18, to go into effect on January 3, 1977.
- Advertising for cigarettes and tobacco products was banned on Australian television and radio as new laws went into effect. On the same day, Canada's postal rates increased 25 percent, with the cost of mailing a first class letter rising from 8 cents to 10 cents.
- Aparicio Méndez, a jurist, was inaugurated as the civilian President of Uruguay after being appointed to a five-year term by the COSENA (Consejo de Seguridad Nacional) that ruled the South American nation. Among the first acts by Mendez as President was to issue a decree cancelling the rights of thousands of people associated with political parties prior to the military coup, including recently deposed president Juan Maria Bordaberry.
- The parliament of the Republic of Ireland narrowly voted to reinstitute the national state of emergency, at the request of Prime Minister Liam Cosgrave, after having been approved, 70 to 65 in the Dail Eirann and 35 to 18 in the Irish Senate. The emergency decree by Cosgrave allowed prisoners to be detained up to seven days without the filing of charges. Before taking effect, the legislation still had to be approved by the president of Ireland, but after inaction for nearly three weeks, President Cearbhall Ó Dálaigh announced on September 19 that he was going to postpone signing the bill. Ó Dálaigh signed the bill on October 16 after Ireland's Supreme Court ruled the legislation to be constitutional, then gave his resignation on October 22.
- The new session of the Mexican Congress began as the 64 members of the Senate of the Republic and the 231 members of the Chamber of Deputies. All but one Senator and 41 of the 231 deputies were members of the ruling Institutional Revolutionary Party.
- U.S. Representative Wayne Hays, a Democrat who had represented Ohio in Congress for almost 28 years, resigned after having been implicated in a scandal for his affair with Elizabeth Ray, whom he had hired as a secretary and clerk solely for her sexual services. The Washington Post had broken the story on May 23, quoting Ray as saying "I can't type, I can't file, I can't even answer the phone."
- Born:
  - Ivano Brugnetti, Italian race walker and 2004 Olympic gold medalist; in Milan
  - Marcos Ambrose, Australian V8 Supercar racing champion; in Launceston, Tasmania
- Died:
  - General Khademul Bashar, 41, Chief of Staff of the Bangladesh Air Force, was killed in an airplane crash while on his way to the inauguration of the new Flying Instructors School at Tegjaon. He and his pilot were killed when the aircraft, a new Airtourer, crashed on landing.
  - C. E. Stevens, 71, British professor at Oxford University and classicist

== September 2, 1976 (Thursday) ==
- U.S. President Gerald Ford issued Executive Order 11935, requiring that U.S. government employees had to be American citizens before being employed. The action followed a U.S. Supreme Court decision, in the case of Hampton v. Mow Sun Wong, that the U.S. Civil Service Commission could not issue regulations prohibiting non-citizens from being employed.
- Voting was held in Barbados for the 24-seat House of Assembly, and Prime Minister Errol Barrow's Democratic Labour Party lost its 18 to 6 majority and control of the government. The Barbados Labour Party, led by Tom Adams, won 11 seats and a 17 to 7 majority, with Adams taking office as the new Prime Minister the next day.
- The first Canada Cup ice hockey tournament, between the national teams from Canada, Czechoslovakia, Finland, the Soviet Union, Sweden and the United States, each playing each other once, followed by a championship series between the two teams with the best records, opened with a game in Ottawa between Canada and Finland. Canada won, 11 to 2. Over the next nine days, games would be played in Ottawa, Toronto, Montreal, Philadelphia, Winnipeg, and Quebec City, with the best 2-of-3 series starting on September 13.
- Born:
  - Marchy Lee (sporting name of Lee Ying-kin), Hong Kong Formula racing car driver, 2002 Audi R8 LMS Cup champion; in Hong Kong
  - Erin Hershey Presley, American TV actress and soap opera star; in Seattle

== September 3, 1976 (Friday) ==
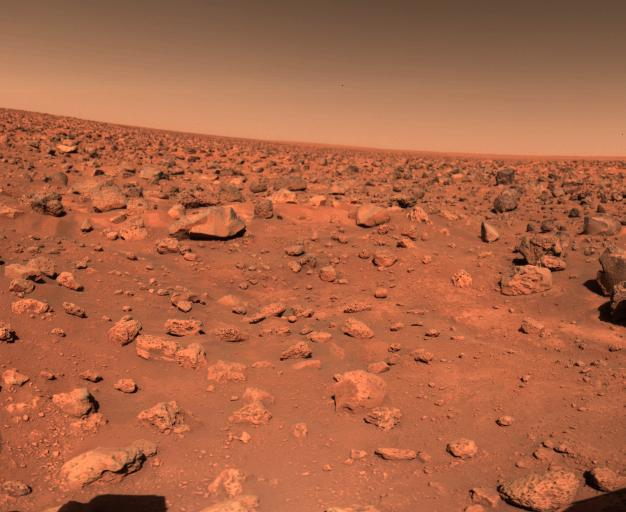
The first color image of Mars from Viking 2

- The Viking 2 lander, launched from Earth on September 10, 1975, touched down at Utopia Planitia on Mars, about 200 kilometres (120 mi) west of the crater Mia at 22:58 UTC and took color photos of the planet's surface starting on September 5. It would operate until April 12, 1980.
- A crash killed all 68 people on a chartered Venezuelan Air Force aircraft. The Lockheed C-130 Hercules, during a heavy rainfall, struck a hillside, during its approach to the Terceira Island Airport in the Azores. Most of the victims had been part of the choir at the Central University of Venezuela and were flying from Bermuda to Spain for a tour and a scheduled appearance in Barcelona.
- Both Christian and Muslim factions in the Lebanese Civil War agreed not to fire at each other in the vicinity of the presidential palace in Beirut, so that repairs could be made in time for the inauguration of Elias Sarkis as the new president.
- The Convention on the International Maritime Satellite Organization was signed at London, creating the INMARSAT, the International Maritime Satellite Organization. The treaty would enter into force on July 16, 1979.
- Four journalists for the Fresno Bee of Fresno, California, were jailed for contempt of court after refusing to reveal the identity of a confidential source who had leaked grand jury testimony about a public official charged with bribery. The four men— investigative reporters Joe Rosato and William K. Patterson, ombudsman James H. Bort Jr. and managing editor George F. Gruner— spent 15 days in jail rather than break the promise of confidentiality. Judge Hollis G. Best, who had sent the journalists to jail, ruled that they could be released and told reporters, "I am persuaded that the newsman's ethic is a moral principle."
- FC Dinamo Tbilisi, the third place regular season finisher, won the soccer football championship tournament of the USSR, the Soviet Cup, defeating Ararat Yerevan, 3 to 0, before a crowd of 45,000 at Lenin Central Stadium at Luzhniki in Moscow. Dinamo Tbilisi had been the third-place finisher in the 16-team Champions League and Yerevan second place. Dynamo Moscow, the '76 regular season champion, had been eliminated in the quarterfinals on July 3.
- Born:
  - Chamath Palihapitiya, Sri Lankan-born Canadian venture capitalist, founder and CEO of Social Capital, Inc.; in Colombo
  - Vivek Oberoi, Indian film actor and two time Filmfare Award winner; in Hyderabad, Andhra Pradesh state
  - Arjan Bajwa, Indian film actor and Stardust Award winner; in Delhi

== September 4, 1976 (Saturday) ==
- Voters in Guam participated in a non-binding referendum about the U.S. territory's future status. Although 24% favored U.S. statehood and 9% wanted Guam to be an independent nation, more than half (58%) wanted to remain a U.S. territory with additional autonomy.
- In the worst accident for Canada's small Austin Airways, all nine passengers and the pilot on a DHC-3 Otter seaplane were killed when the aircraft struck power lines and plunged into the Abitibi Canyon near Fraserdale, Ontario. The passengers were on their way to Timmins, Ontario, to discuss electrical planning as part of a tour of Canadian Indian communities and included three provincial officials, three power company representatives, three members of the First Nations group "Treaty No. 9", and a London Free Press reporter. The Otter airplane "received a three-phase burst of 132,000 volts" of electricity from the wires and exploded.
- A group of three Palestinians hijacked KLM Flight 366, a DC-9 airliner with 80 people on board, shortly after its takeoff from the French city of Nice toward Amsterdam. Most of the passengers were returning to the Netherlands from a holidays in Spain and southern France, and after the plane from Málaga landed with 28 Dutch tourists in Paris, 49 more boarded to go to Amsterdam. The aircraft was flown to Tunis and then to Larnaca in Cyprus, then toward Israel before returning to Larnaca where the hostages were released the next day and the hijackers were allowed to go to the Libyan Embassy for asylum and passage to a country of their choice.

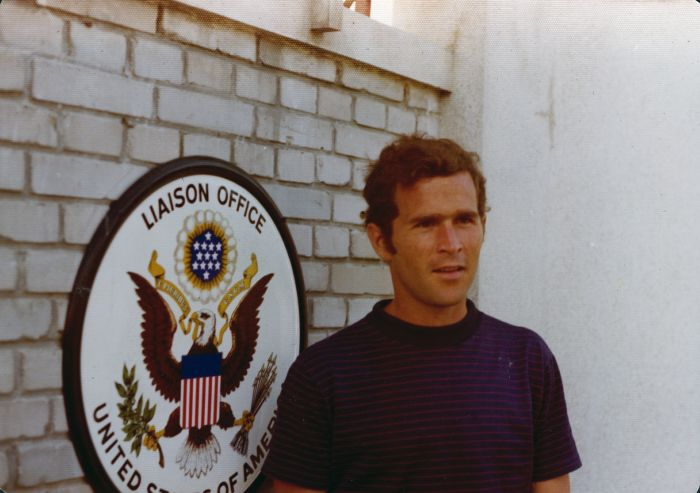
George W. Bush at 29

- Future U.S. President George W. Bush, the 30-year-old son of CIA Director George Bush, was arrested for drunken driving after being pulled over near the family home in Kennebunkport, Maine. Bush was fined $150 and his Maine driver's license was briefly suspended.
- The 1,500th anniversary of the Fall of the Western Roman Empire was noted by scholars without celebration. On September 4, 476 AD, the last Emperor of Rome, 11-year-old Romulus Augustulus had been forced to abdicate from the throne in Ravenna by Flavius Odoacer, the barbarian commander of the Roman Guard and sent into exile at a resort in Campania on the Bay of Naples and given a pension for the rest of his life.
- Died:
  - George Groves, 74, British-born U.S. audio engineer who became the first "sound man" in motion picture history as the person in charge of providing sound to The Jazz Singer
  - Laco Novomeský, 71, Hungarian-born Slovak Communist politician jailed in the 1950s after accusations of "bourgeois nationalism", later rehabilitated in the 1960s and promoted to the Party's Central Committee.

== September 5, 1976 (Sunday) ==
- The Muppet Show was broadcast for the first time on ITV, appearing across Britain at 5:05 pm, with Joel Grey as the first celebrity guest., and released for syndication simultaneously worldwide. Within four months, it would be appearing on TV in 100 nations.
- Comedians Jerry Lewis and Dean Martin, who had been the comedy team of Martin and Lewis for ten years until a bitter parting of ways in 1956, were reunited on the nationwide live television broadcast of the annual Labor Day Weekend Jerry Lewis MDA Telethon at the Sahara Hilton Hotel in Las Vegas. The reunion, arranged as a surprise by singer Frank Sinatra, came in the early hours of the telethon, which had started at 6:00 in the evening local time as part of Lewis's fundraising for the Muscular Dystrophy Association. After Sinatra sang a few songs for the fundraiser, he departed from the script and told Lewis "I've got a friend I wanted you to meet," and Martin walked onstage. Reportedly, Martin and Lewis had not spoken to each other in more than 20 years. Sinatra remarked, "Come on, I thought it was about time you guys got together again." The 11th annual telethon set a new record in pledges to the MDA, raising $21,723,813.
- Voting was held in Cyprus for the 35 seats reserved for Greek Cypriots in the 50-member Voulí ton Antiprosópon. No candidates participate in voting for the 15 seats reserved for Turkish Cypriots.
- The first-ever World Professional Skateboard Championships concluded after being held on Saturday and Sunday at the Long Beach Arena in Long Beach, California and sponsored by a skateboard manufacturer, California Free Farmer Company, which provided a total of $20,000 in prize money.
- Born:
  - Carice van Houten, Dutch film and TV actress, 2006 European Film Award winner and multiple winner of the Golden Calf Award and the Rembrandt Award; in Leiderdorp, South Holland
  - Pankaj Tripathi, Indian film actor; in Gopalganj, Bihar state
- Died:
  - Wan Waithayakon, 75, Thai royal prince and diplomat, President of the U.N. General Assembly 1956 to 1957
  - Arthur Gilligan, 81, captain of the English cricket team in 1924 and 1925

== September 6, 1976 (Monday) ==
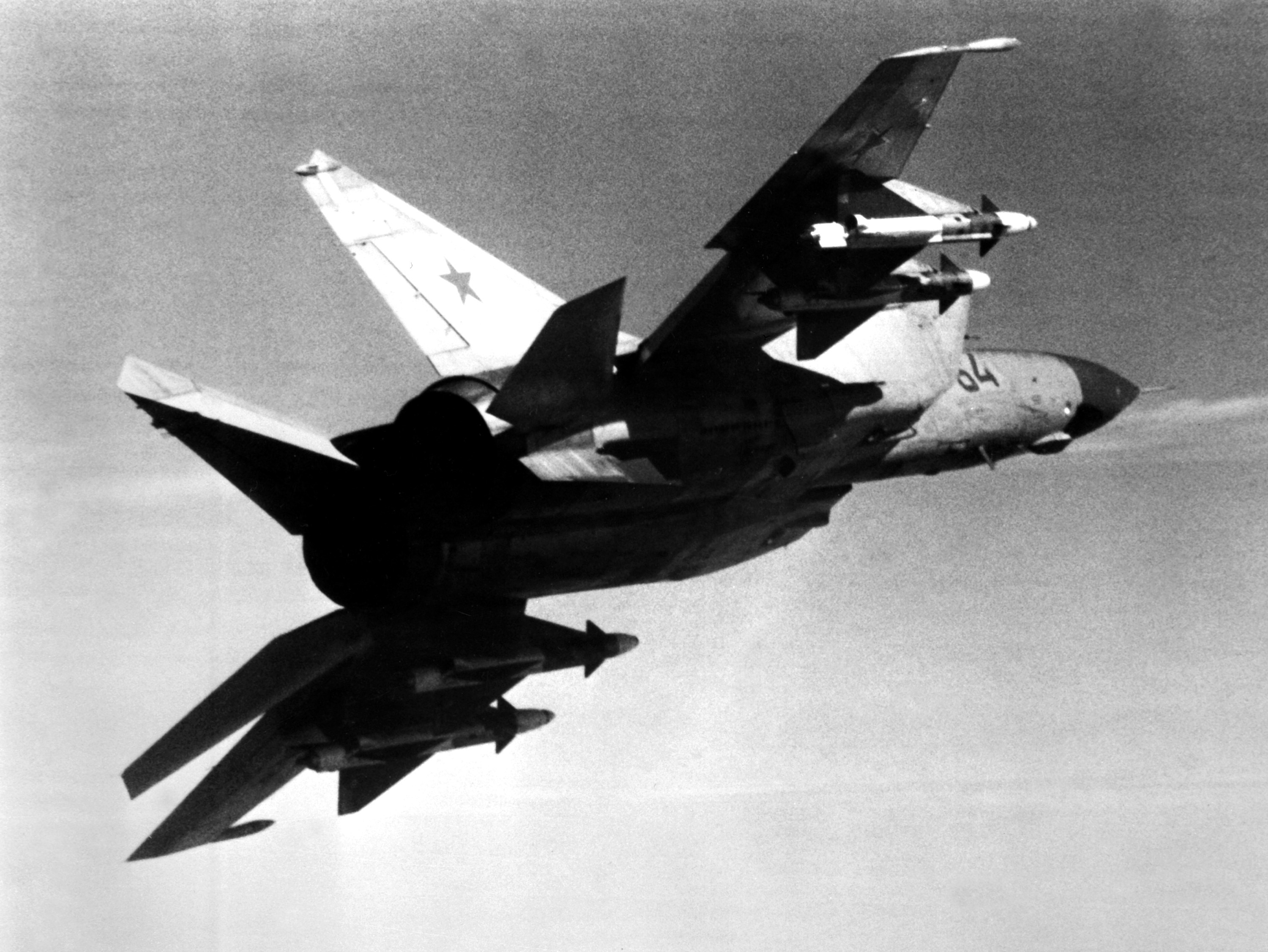
A Soviet MiG-25 Foxbat

- A Soviet Air Forces pilot, Lieutenant Viktor Belenko, broke away from a routine training flight from the Chuguyevka Air Base in the far southeastern portion of the Soviet Union, and flew to Japanese airspace with the USSR's newest warplane, the MiG-25 "Foxbat" fighter. Intending to find the Chitose Air Base near Sapporo and land the new MiG-25 jet fighter there, Belenko ran out of fuel and landed at 1:57 pm at a civilian airport at Hakodate, where he over ran the short runway. He requested political asylum in the United States. In that the MiG-25 was new and had never been seen close enough for an inspection, American and Japanese experts gradually disassembled what was, at the time, "considered the world's most advanced fighter," which included defusing self-destruct devices that had been wired into the sensitive electronic equipment. The U.S. granted Belenko's request for asylum the day after his defection.
- Vietnam disclosed the names of 12 American pilots (seven U.S. Air Force and five U.S. Navy) who had been listed as missing in action during the Vietnam War but who had been killed after being shot down, and asked that the United States would "show its good will and take concrete action to settle postwar problems between the two countries." One of the officers, U.S. Navy Captain William M. Roark, from whom the frigate USS Roark was named, had been shot down after taking off from the carrier USS Coral Sea on April 7, 1965. Two pilots on the list, U.S. Navy officers Lieutenant Commander Thomas C. Kolstad and Lieutenant William B. Klenert, had been shot down on October 23, 1966, after their plane took off on a mission from the aircraft carrier USS Constellation.
- Representatives of the American-led United Nations Command in South Korea signed an agreement with envoys of North Korea and Panmunjom to amend the 1953 Korean Armistice Agreement that had ended the Korean War. U.S. Army Colonel Terrence W. McClain and North Korean Colonel Choi Yun-chol signed on behalf of the respective parties. Under the agreement, brought about by the August 18 incident in which two U.S. soldiers were killed, the 800 m (2,600 ft) wide Korean Demilitarized Zone was effectively split in half with North Korea to remove the four guard posts that it had maintained on the 400 meter portion of the DMZ that was south of the Military Demarcation Line.
- Two women, Josephine Davis and Aileen Davis, were found stabbed to death in Elizabethtown, North Carolina the day after Joseph Sledge had jumped a fence to escape the nearby White Lake Prison Camp, which was also in Bladen County. After being returned to the camp to serve out a sentence for larceny, Sledge would be wrongfully charged with murder, convicted and sentenced to consecutive life sentences based on the testimony of two inmates at the camp who claimed that he had confessed to the killing. Thirty-six years after making the allegation, one of the inmates, Herman Baker, recanted his testimony and said that he had lied in order to receive a reward for information and to have a lesser sentence. Sledge would be released after spending 36 years behind bars for a crime that he had not committed.
- Born:
  - Naomie Harris, English film and TV actress; in London
  - Hyun Young, South Korean model, actress and TV show host; in Suwon, Gyeonggi Province
- Died: Clarice Benini, 71, Italian chess grandmaster, was murdered by her neighbor at her home in Rufina, near Florence.

== September 7, 1976 (Tuesday) ==
- Victor Sokolov, a Soviet dissident and former journalist, was declared to have forfeited his Soviet Union citizenship by a resolution of the Presidium of the Supreme Soviet. Ten months earlier, he had been permitted to leave the country.
- Italy's renowned La Scala Opera company gave its first-ever performance in the United States, with a show at the Kennedy Center in Washington D.C. attended by "Washington's social elite, who regarded La Scala's performance as the start of the capital's social season" and members of the Music Critics Association, which had timed its convention to coincide with the debut.
- The New York Times began a trend of reducing the number of columns within its newspaper, going from eight columns to six columns but without changing its overall width. In 2007, it would join a trend set by other papers and reduce its width from 13.5 inches (34 cm) to 12 inches (30 cm), an 11% or one-ninth reduction.
- American mountain climber Willi Unsoeld and his daughter, Nanda Devi Unsoeld, were on an expedition to climb Nanda Devi, the highest mountain in India and the inspiration for her name, when she died from a severe blood clot caused by high altitude sickness. Because Nanda Devi Unsoeld's death happened at about 24,000 feet (7,300 m) on the 25,463 foot (7,761 m) altitude mountain, bringing her body back down was impractical. Unsoeld and Nanda's fiancee Andy Harvard gave her the traditional burial rite for climbers lost at high altitude and bundled her body in her sleeping bag and lowered it into a crevice. Willi Unsoeld himself would be killed in an avalanche two-and-a-half years later while descending Mount Rainier on March 4, 1979.
- Died:
  - Anna Kéthly, 86, Hungarian politician who served briefly as leader of the Social Democratic Party of Hungary during the Hungarian Revolution of 1956 until the Soviet Union invaded Hungary and restored Communist rule. She had lived the remaining years of her life in exile after fleeing the country from certain arrest.
  - Bernard Peiffer, 53, French-born American jazz composer

== September 8, 1976 (Wednesday) ==
- The Autonomous Region of the Azores was established by Portugal to grant some self-government to the islands in the north Atlantic, with João Bosco Mota Amaral being sworn in by Portugal's President Antonio Ramalho Eanes as the first President of the Autonomous Regional Government in a ceremony at Ponta Delgada on São Miguel Island.
- The first full-sized luxury electric car, the Transformer 1, was introduced by Apollo Energy Systems and sold to violinist Yehudi Menuhin.
- The TV interview show A fondo premiered in Spain's Televisión Española public TV network and would run until 1981.
- The Brazilian airline Rio Sul began operations with flights in Southern Brazil including in Rio de Janeiro and São Paulo, with a flight from Porto Alegre to Pelotas in the state of Rio Grande do Sul.
- The government of Argentina outlawed the Jehovah's Witnesses religious denomination, shut down publication of its periodicals, and closed the existing Kingdom Hall houses of worship in the South American nation, declaring that the Testigos de Jehová "supports principles which go against nationhood, basic institutions and fundamental concepts."
- Brenda Cuttin, a 42-year-old British trapeze artist, fell 60 feet (18 m) to her death in front of a sold-out crowd of 5,800 people when the Ringling Brothers and Barnum & Bailey Circus came to Selland Arena at Fresno, California. Cuttin fell head first and landed on a concrete floor a few feet in front of spectators on the front row.
- Died: Mabalo Lokela, 44, Zairean schoolteacher and the first person to die of the Ebola virus, which he had contracted 14 days earlier.

== September 9, 1976 (Thursday) ==
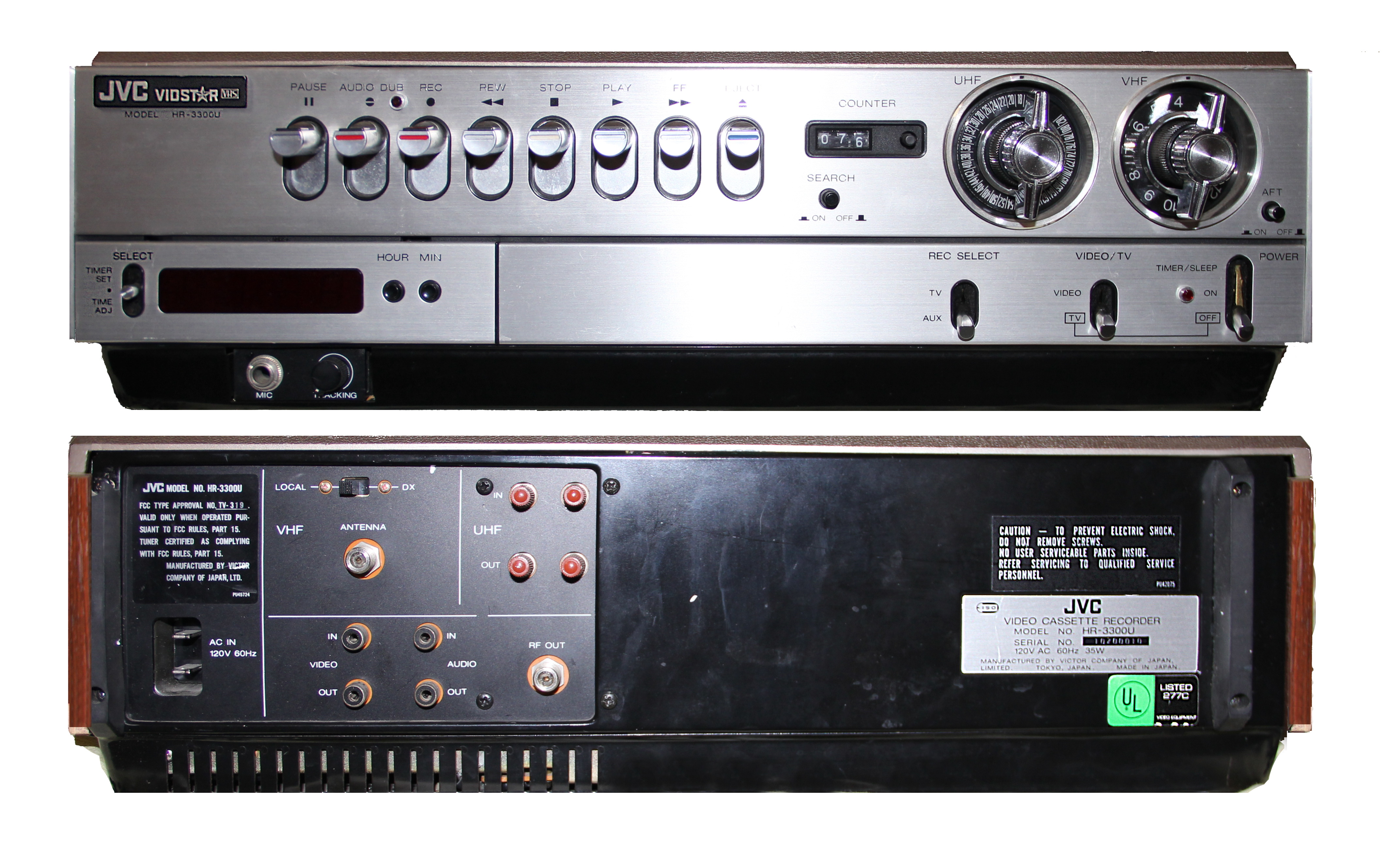
The first VHS recorder

- Mao Zedong, chairman of the Chinese Communist Party and the de facto leader of China's 800 million people, died at the age of 82 from a heart attack at 12:10 in the morning, ten minutes after he was disconnected from life support. Mao had suffered the first of two heart attacks on September 2, followed by another two days later and fell into a coma on September 7. The Chinese Communist Party waited until 4:00 in the afternoon to announce Chairman Mao's death and made the statement, "Mao Zedong passed away at 0010 hours on September 9 because of worsening of his illness and despite all treatment, although meticulous medical care was given him in every away after he fell ill." The announcement was preceded by several notices that an important broadcast would be made at 4:00 pm.
- The VHS (Video Home System) recorder and its videocassette system, which would become the standard for home video recording, was introduced at a press conference at the Hotel Okura in Tokyo by the president of JVC (Japan Victor Company) with the unveiling of the HR-3300, branded as the "VIDSTAR" in the West. The machine would go on sale on October 31, 1976, at the initial price of 310,000 Japanese yen ($1,060, equivalent to $5,100 in 2021) and be released in the United States on August 23, 1977.
- All 47 passengers and five crew on Aeroflot Flight 7957, and all 18 people on Aeroflot Flight 31, were killed when the two airplanes collided in mid-air over the Black Sea at an altitude of 5,700 metres (18,700 ft). Flight 7957 was an Antonov An-24 and had departed Donetsk in Ukraine at 12:56 local time, while Flight 31, a Yakovlev Yak-40 had left Rostov in Russia at 12:47 on a multi-stop flight. Both aircraft were cleared for landing at the same runway in Sochi's Adler Airport when they ran into each other at 1:51 in the afternoon.
- More than 100 people were killed, and almost 300 injured, in the collision of two passenger trains in the west African nation of Cameroon.
- Born:
  - Emma de Caunes, French film actress; in Paris
  - Humayun Khan, Dubai-born Muslim U.S. Army Captain and war hero killed in the Iraq War; in Dubai, United Arab Emirates (d. 2004)

== September 10, 1976 (Friday) ==
- All 176 aboard two airliners were killed in the collision between a British Airways Trident and a Yugoslavian DC-9 over the town of Vrbovec near Zagreb. British Airways Flight 475, an HS-121 Trident, had departed London and was en route to Istanbul and had 54 passengers and a crew of nine. Inex-Adria Flight 550, a Douglas DC-9, had taken off from Split in SR Croatia in Yugoslavia, and was bound for Cologne in West Germany with 108 passengers, most of them West German tourists returning home, and five crew. An air traffic controller at Zagreb advised the Yugoslavian flight that the British flight was at an altitude of 33,500 feet (10,200 m) when it was actually at 33,000 feet (10,000 m), the altitude cleared for the Yugoslavian DC-9. At 10:14 in the morning UTC, the DC-9's wing cut through the cockpit of the Trident and both aircraft plunged to the ground. The controller, Gradimir Tasic, would be found guilty of criminal negligence on May 16, 1977, and sentenced to seven years in prison, while seven other controllers were acquitted.
- Six members of a terrorist group called "Fighters for Free Croatia" hijacked TWA Flight 355, which had departed New York's La Guardia Airport toward Chicago, and forced the Boeing 727 to fly to Montreal. Once the flight was taken over, the hijackers forced the pilot to transmit a radio message to the tower to alert police that a time bomb had been placed in a coin locker near Grand Central Station. In addition to the bomb, the locker contained two letters, one of which was the group's manifesto and a demand that the text be published on the front page of five U.S. newspapers (The New York Times, Los Angeles Times, Washington Post, Chicago Tribune and International Herald-Tribune, of which only the Herald-Tribune elected not to publish the statement) after which the police would be alerted to the location of a second bomb and added that if the demands were not met by the deadline, the second bomb would be activated. Upon arriving at locker 5713 in a building across the street from Grand Central Station, police found a sealed pressure cooker and removed the bomb, with fatal consequences hours later.
- An Indian Airlines jet flying from New Delhi to Mumbai was hijacked by a group of six gunmen and diverted to Lahore in Pakistan, where the 71 passengers were released. A team of commandos stormed the airplane and freed the seven crew and took the hijackers into custody early the next day, 21 hours after the plane had been seized.
- The government of South Africa made partial concessions in its apartheid policy of racial segregation, relaxing rules against people of mixed race— "coloureds" or "kleurlinge" — though not changing its practice toward black South Africans. According to the announcement, coloureds "would no longer have to use separate lavatories, washrooms and waiting rooms in public buildings" and, along with Asians, could set up businesses outside of designated areas and could trade union officials.
- Born: Gustavo Kuerten, Brazilian professional tennis player and winner of the French Open in 1997, 2000 and 2001; in Florianópolis
- Died:
  - Dalton Trumbo, 70, American film screenwriter who was blacklisted in the 1950s and was unable to take credit for the 1953 and 1956 Academy Awards for best screenplay
  - Mordecai Wyatt Johnson, 85, African-American preacher and educator, and the first black president of Howard University
  - Dorothy Devore (stage name for Alma Inez Williams), 77, American comedienne and silent film actress
  - Sergio Karakachoff, 37, Argentine journalist and dissident, was kidnapped, tortured and murdered in the city of La Plata, after having written an article titled "Acerca de la violencia" ("About Violence"). His body and that of a co-worker, Domingo Terrugi, who had been kidnapped at the same time, were found the next day.

== September 11, 1976 (Saturday) ==
- Nagarjuna University was inaugurated in the Indian city of Namburu in the Andhra Pradesh state, with former Indian President Fakhruddin Ali Ahmed. Since 2004, it has been called Acharya Nagarjuna University.
- The National Wrestling Hall of Fame and Museum was inaugurated in Stillwater, Oklahoma, near the campus of Oklahoma State University.
- The hijackers of TWA Flight 355 from New York freed 33 passengers of the 93 hostages at Gander Airport in Newfoundland after refueling in Montreal, then departed for Europe. After flying to Reykjavík in Iceland, Flight 355 landed at Paris's Charles de Gaulle Airport, where French security forces punctured the Boeing aircraft's tires to prevent it from taking off again. The terrorists— five men and one woman— released their 60 remaining hostages after their demands had been met for their manifesto to be printed in major U.S. newspapers and for leaflets to be dropped by air over London, Paris, Montreal, Chicago and New York. Four major newspapers in the U.S. had earlier printed the Free Croatia manifesto as demanded by the group.
- The terrorist bomb placed by the Free Croatia group exploded after being taken to a demolition pit at the New York Police Department firing range at Rodman Neck in the Bronx, killing NYPD Officer Brian J. Murray, a specialist who had been attempting to disarm it, and injuring three other bomb squad members, none of whom were wearing protective covering. Police had attempted earlier to detonate the bomb by remote control and, by doing so, had apparently activated the timing device, which set off the bomb as officers had approached to inspect it.
- The government of Chilean dictator Augusto Pinochet released 205 political prisoners on the third anniversary of the 1973 coup that had toppled President Salvador Allende but extended the existing state of siege by an additional six months.
- The National Day of Catalonia was publicly observed for the first time since 1938, when it was oppressed by the government of Francisco Franco. The official observance, coinciding with the democratization of Spain, was held 10 months after Franco's death.
- Pope Paul VI met at the Vatican with French bishop Marcel Lefebvre, who had rebelled against the reforms of the Second Vatican Council by founding the anti-Modernist Society of Saint Pius X on November 1, 1970. Paul VI and, later, Pope John Paul II were unable to persuade Lefebvre to adhere to Vatican directives and Lefebvre would be excommunicated in 1988.
- The New River, a 50 mi (80 km) long waterway that flows past Jacksonville, North Carolina and Camp Lejeune, was saved from being dammed when U.S. President Gerald Ford signed a bill cancelling a proposed hydroelectric dam project. Noting that the geologists had estimated the New River, despite its name, to be the second-oldest in the world (at 100 million years, "second in age only to the Nile"), President Ford said "I hope the New River will flow free and clear for another 100 million years."
- A man in Ligonier, Pennsylvania, died from a heart attack just seconds after completing his vows during his wedding ceremony, prompting a legal battle over whether his bride was entitled to inherit from him. Robert Neiderhiser, who suffered from rheumatic heart disease, collapsed at the altar after saying "I do". His bride sued for control of his estate, stating that she was his widow; his parents filed an objection, stating that the ceremony had not been completed. The probate court would rule in favor of Mrs. Neiderhiser after testimony that the groom collapsed as the pastor said "I now pronounce you man and wife."
- Died:
  - Shōjirō Ishibashi, 87, Japanese manufacturer who founded Bridgestone Corporation, now the world's largest maker of tires, in 1930. The named "Bridgestone" was derived from a literal translation of Ishibashi's name (Ishi= "stone", Bashi= "bridge").
  - Carl Carmer, 82, American novelist and nonfiction book writer known for the 1934 bestseller Stars Fell on Alabama.
  - Paul Pascoe, 67, New Zealand architect

== September 12, 1976 (Sunday) ==
- Nine police officers and two civilians were killed in the explosion of a car bomb that destroyed a passing bus that was transporting policemen in Argentina in the city of Rosario, and by machine gun fire directed from a second passing vehicle against those who had survived the explosion. Another 50 people were injured. The two civilians, a husband and wife, had been in a car driving behind the bus. The Montoneros terrorist group claimed responsibility for the attack.
- The body of an unidentified female, described in press accounts as "Woodlawn Jane Doe", was found in the U.S. outside a cemetery near Baltimore, Maryland. Her identity would be a mystery for 45 years until DNA confirmed that she was Margaret Fetterolf, a 16-year-old girl from Alexandria, Virginia, who was reported as missing in the summer of 1975.
- Godefroid Munongo, who had formerly served as the Interior Minister of the Democratic Republic of the Congo and governor of the Katanga Province, was enthroned by the Nyamwezi people as the ceremonial King Msiri V.
- The Sunday morning educational children's TV show Animals, Animals, Animals premiered on the U.S. ABC television network. Hosted by comedian Hal Linden, the series ran for six seasons.
- Born:
  - Tariq Umar Khan, Indian film director known for The Good Road; in Faizabad, Uttar Pradesh
  - Carissa Phelps, American attorney, author and former runaway was the subject of a 2008 documentary, Carissa, in 2008; in Fresno, California
  - Murali Kartik, Indian national cricket team bowler (2000 to 2007) and player in the English league 1996 to 2014; later a TV commentator for Indian cricket broadcasts; in Madras, Tamil Nadu state
  - Maciej Zurawski, Polish soccer football forward and national team member; in Poznań
  - Aleksandr Dolmatov, Russian opposition activist who committed suicide in the Netherlands after being denied political asylum and was sent to a center for deportation; in Russia (d. 2013)

== September 13, 1976 (Monday) ==
- In Pakistan, the collapse of a six-story apartment building in Karachi killed 139 people. The building had been constructed only one year earlier and the owner and contractor had only been given permission to erect a two story structure on the site because of the poor foundation for construction. The owner, Karam Elahi, lost all six members of his family in the collapse and was arrested along with the contractor, Ishaq Soomro.
- The Government in the Sunshine Act, commonly referred to as the "Sunshine Law", providing for nearly all meetings in the U.S. federal government to be open to the public (with ten specific exceptions) was signed into law by U.S. President Gerald R. Ford after passing unanimously in the House of Representatives (391 to 0) and the Senate (94 to 0). The exceptions included were for national defense, personnel rules for agencies, trade secrets, and accusations of a crime.
- The United States used its veto power in the United Nations Security Council to block the application by the Socialist Republic of Vietnam for UN membership.
- The first multi-party elections in Trinidad and Tobago were held for the 36 seats of the Trinidadian House of Representatives. The ruling People's National Movement party, led by Prime Minister Eric Williams won 24 seats and the United Labour Front of Basdeo Panday won 10. Panday would become Prime Minister in 1995 and serve until 2001.
- Died: Camilo Ponce Enríquez, 64, the 30th President of Ecuador (from 1956 to 1960); the county of Camilo Ponce Enríquez was named in his honor

== September 14, 1976 (Tuesday) ==
- The National Emergencies Act was signed into law by U.S. President Ford, allowing the automatic termination of existing states of emergency in the U.S. effective September 14, 1978, and providing a two year limit on the duration of emergencies unless renewed by the U.S. president. The U.S. presidential proclamations of states of national emergency declared in the Emergency Banking Act of 1933 by Franklin D. Roosevelt during the Great Depression, by Harry S. Truman on December 16, 1950 during the Korean War, would be the most notable of the early terminations, and by Richard M. Nixon in 1970 (during a postal strike) and in 1971 (because of worsening economic conditions) were all terminated. The new law also put a check on the U.S. President's military authority by giving Congress the right to end any future national emergencies by revisiting the issues every six months.
- All 20 members of the cabinet of Japan's Prime Minister Takeo Miki resigned at his request in the wake of the Lockheed bribery scandals as an effort to stop a split between his ruling Liberal Democratic Party before the expiration of the terms of the 511 members of the House of Representatives and a planned election for a new house.
- The International Red Cross completed its evacuation from Vietnam of foreigners who had been stranded since the fall of South Vietnam on April 30, 1975, bringing out the last 215 non-Vietnam residents on a flight from Ho Chi Minh City (formerly the South Vietnamese capital, Saigon) to Bangkok in Thailand. In all, more than 3,000 people had been repatriated after Vietnam allowed them to leave.
- An F-14 fighter plane, equipped with one of the new top secret AIM-54 Phoenix air-to-air guided missiles and the F-14's computerized firing and tracking systeam, accidentally rolled off of the deck of the U.S. Navy aircraft carrier USS John F. Kennedy and plunged into the North Atlantic Ocean and sank to a depth of 1,890 feet (580 m) at a location 75 miles (121 km) northwest of Scotland, prompting a salvage operation to prevent the Soviet Union from getting the newest U.S. weapon first. According to the U.S. Navy, the F-14 had been on the forward flight deck in preparation for a catapult-assisted take-off when the automated control system began powering up one of the jet's engines. Because the brakes were locked, the F-14 veered at an angle across the deck while the pilot and navigator were inside. Before the pilot could activate the fuel-cutoff valve, the jet fighter rolled off the side of the carrier while the two crew ejected to safety. The loss of the F-14 came two weeks after one of the Soviet Union's newest jet fighters, a MiG-25, had been landed in Japan by a defecting pilot of the Soviet Air Forces. The missile was finally located on October 31. Recovery of the jet and the missile cost $2.4 million, "about 15 percent of the Tomcat's original cost of $16 million."
- Born: Vladimir Tushinsky, Russian serial killer and pedophile who killed at least five girls and women over a three-and-a-half-year period. Though sentenced to life imprisonment rather than execution, he died from "sudden cardiac arrest without signs of violent death" while being transferred to another prison. (d. 2016)
- Died: Paul Karadordevic, 83, regent of the Kingdom of Yugoslavia from 1934 to 1941 during the minority of his nephew, King Peter II. His funeral in Paris attracted three men who were the last kings of their nations— including Constantine II of Greece, Umberto II of Italy and Michael of Romania— and a pretender to the throne of France, Henri, the Count of Paris, the great-great-grandson of Louis Philippe I.

== September 15, 1976 (Wednesday) ==
- Israel and Syria temporarily opened the security fences along the Golan Heights, which Israel had captured from Syria in the 1967 Six-Day War, in order to allow Druze villagers from both countries to meet with relatives they hadn't seen in more than nine years. Syria agreed to the reunions to take place within the buffer zone set up by the United Nations on the condition that news correspondents not be allowed at the reunion site. Roughly 40 men and women in the Israeli-occupied village of Majdal Shams and the Syrian village of Hadr took advantage of the offer.
- The government of South Africa began the forcible relocation of 45,000 black members of the Tswana people from Rooijantjiesfontein in the Transvaal Province, transporting them to Deelpan, a location 35 miles (56 km) to the west.

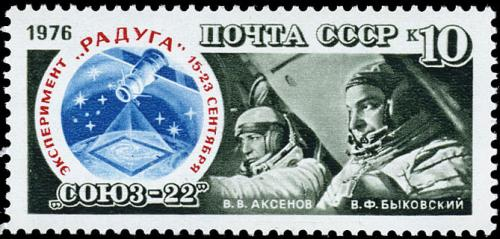
Aksyonov and Bykovsky on a 10-kopek stamp

- Soyuz 22 was launched from the Soviet Union with cosmonauts Valery Bykovsky and Vladimir Aksyonov photographing the surface of the Earth with a special high-resolution camera.
- The Convention on Registration of Objects Launched into Outer Space, adopted by the UN General Assembly on November 12, 1974, went into effect. It requires member nations to furnish the United Nations Office for Outer Space Affairs (UNOOSA) with details about each space object sent into orbit.
- Darryl Sittler scored the winning goal in the 1976 Canada Cup for Canada to win over Czechoslovakia in overtime, to win the first Canada Cup, which stayed in Canada.
- All 11 people aboard an Argentine Air Force Lockheed P-2 Neptune reconnaissance airplane were killed when the aircraft crashed into a mountain on Antarctica's Livingston Island. The names of various locations on Livingston Island would be named for victims of the air crash, including Scesa Point and Arroyo Point.
- Died:
  - Moddie Taylor, 64, African American chemist and metallurgist who worked on the Manhattan Project
  - Josef Sudek, 80, Czech photographer

== September 16, 1976 (Thursday) ==
- The first angioplasty (percutaneous transluminal angioplasty) on a human being, a minimally-invasive procedure to widen arteries damaged by atherosclerosis, was performed by West German surgeon Andreas Gruentzig, who had perfected the procedure on dogs.
- The "Night of the Pencils" (La Noche de los Lápices) began in La Plata, Argentina as a roundup of teenagers who were members of the Unión de Estudiantes Secundarios (Union of High School Students), carried out by masked men who went to the homes of known UES members. According to a 1986 documentary of the same name by Héctor Olivera, the impetus for the roundup was that the students had protested in favor of lower bus fares. The teens were taken to detention centers elsewhere in Argentina. Six students, ranging in age from 16 to 18, were taken on the first day and became "desaparecidos". None were ever seen in public again. Four others who were taken in the days that followed survived after being held in detention and tortured.
- A week after the death of Mao Zedong, his widow, Jiang Qing, altered the wording of a directive that Chairman Mao had written on April 30, with the help of the other three members of the "Gang of Four" in China. The new version, published as an editorial in Communist Party newspapers was an alteration of the directive that Mao had given to his designated successor Hua Guofeng, and would lead to the arrest of Ms. Jiang and the other three members of the Gang of Four (Zhang Chunqiao, Yao Wenyuan and Wang Hongwen).
- Shavarsh Karapetyan saved 20 people from a crowded bus that had fallen into the 33 feet (10 m) deep Yerevan Lake in what was then the Armenian SSR in the Soviet Union. Karapetyan, an expert swimmer made repeated dives to the bottom of the lake, broke out a back window and spent roughly 30 seconds for each rescue. Another 72 passengers lost their lives in the accident.
- The Episcopal Church of the United States, by a 124 to 65 vote of its House of Deputies, changed its laws to permit the ordination of women into the Episcopal priesthood. The House of Bishops had previously approved the resolution the day before. On January 1, 1977, Jacqueline Means would be the first woman to become ordained as an Episcopal priest.
- Egyptian President Anwar Sadat was approved for a second six-year term in a yes/no election with no other candidates. Sadat received 9,145,683 of the 9,151,288 votes cast, with only 5,605 (0.06 percent) of voters against him.
- The Chief Executive Officer (CEO) of the RCA Corporation, Anthony L. Conrad, resigned abruptly after admitting to tax evasion. Less than a year earlier, Conrad had led the vote within the RCA Board of Directors to oust president Robert Sarnoff. The Board replaced Conrad with Edgar H. Griffiths.
- Born: DJ Official (stage name for Nelson J. Chu), top selling American Christian hip hop musician whose album Entermission reached number 8 on the U.S. gospel music albums chart in 2010; in The Bronx, New York City
- Died:
  - Bertha Lutz, 82, Brazilian women's rights activist who successfully lobbied for the 1931 grant of the right of women to vote
  - Cecil Thomas, 91, British sculptor and medal designer

== September 17, 1976 (Friday) ==
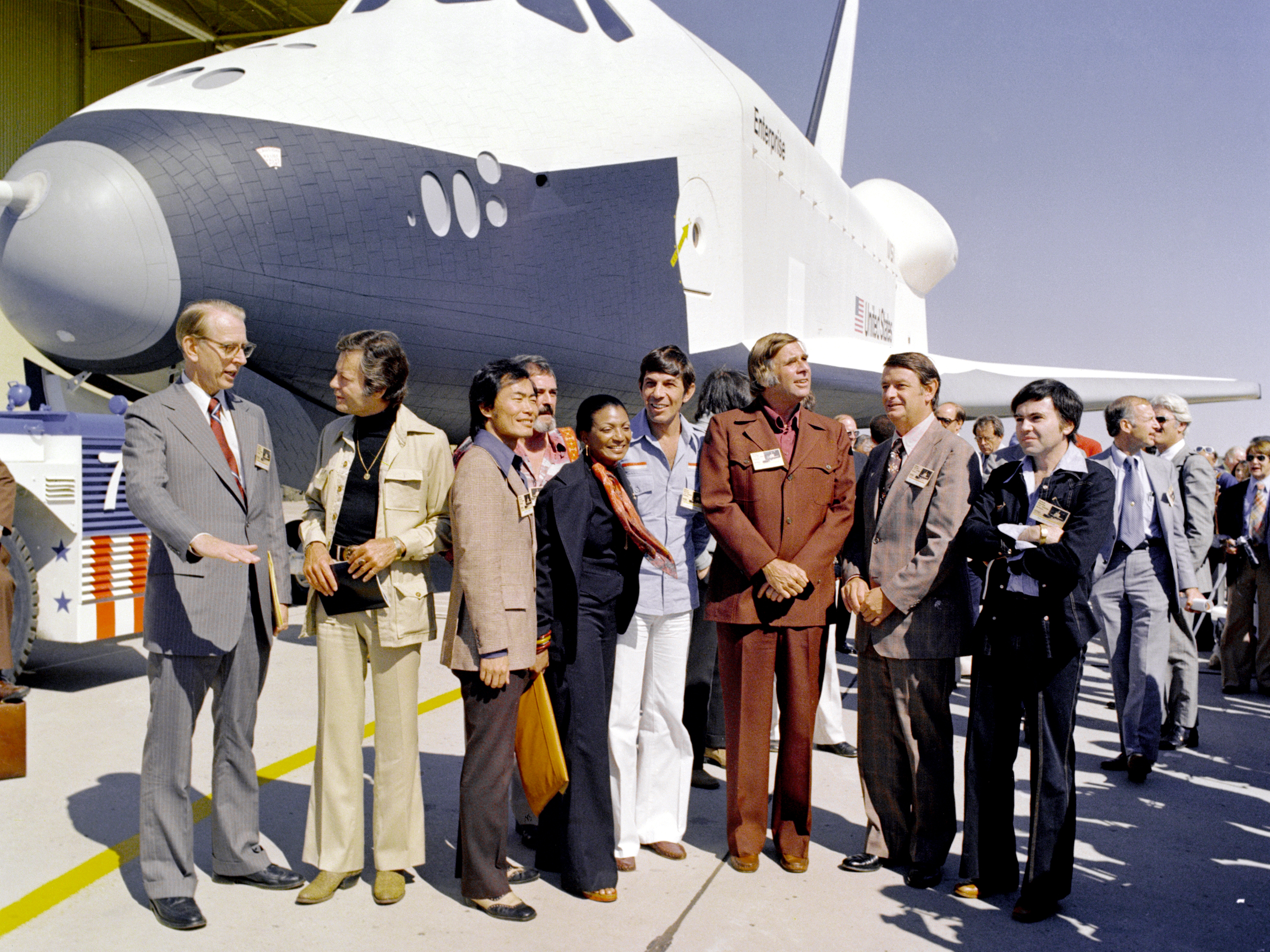
Gene Roddenberry and the cast of Star Trek at the rollout of Shuttle Enterprise

- The first U.S. space shuttle, given the name Enterprise after a letter-writing campaign by fans of the television show Star Trek, was rolled out of a Palmdale, California hangar for its first public display. NASA had initially planned to name the craft Constitution, but "they were overruled by President Ford, who had been urged by 'Star Trek' fans to adopt the name 'Enterprise.'" Ironically, the space shuttle Enterprise never went into space and was used for spare parts for the rest of the shuttle fleet.
- Two days of voting began for the 65-member Parliament of the nation of Malta, with voters aged 18, 19 and 20 being allowed to participate for the first time and the number of seats increased from 55 to 65. Prime Minister Dom Mintoff and his ruling Malta Labour Party, who had a 28 to 27 lead over the National Party in the last parliament, won 6 of the additional 10 seats and finished with a majority of 34 to 31.
- A methane gas explosion and subsequent poisoning killed 143 men in an underground coal mine about 25 miles (40 km) from the city of Tete in the southeast African nation of Mozambique.

== September 18, 1976 (Saturday) ==
- Starting at 3:00 in the afternoon Beijing time, three minutes of silence was observed nationwide in the People's Republic of China for the death of Chinese Communist Party Chairman Mao Zedong, who had led the nation for more than 25 years. In Beijing, at least 750,000 Chinese invited guests gathered in Tiananmen Square for the memorial services, led by Mao's successor, Chairman Hua Guofeng, who praised the totalitarian dictator in his eulogy "It was under Chairman Mao's leadership that the Chinese people, who had long suffered from oppression and exploitation, won emancipation and became masters of the country... the Chinese people love, trust and esteem Chairman Mao from the bottom of their hearts."
- Born: Ronaldo (Ronaldo Luis Nazario), Brazilian soccer football striker, national team member and three-time FIFA World Player of the Year (1997, 1998 and 2002), later owner of the Real Valladolid Spanish professional team; in Rio de Janeiro

== September 19, 1976 (Sunday) ==
- Turkish Airlines Flight 452, a Boeing 727 with 139 passengers and seven crew, crashed into Karakaya Mountain as it was approaching Antalya after taking off from Istanbul almost 30 minutes earlier. An investigation would conclude that the pilot had confused a lighted highway near the city of Isparta for the runway at Antalya, and the 727 descended at an altitude of 3,700 feet (1,100 m) and crashed into a hillside at 11:15 at night. All 154 people on board were killed.

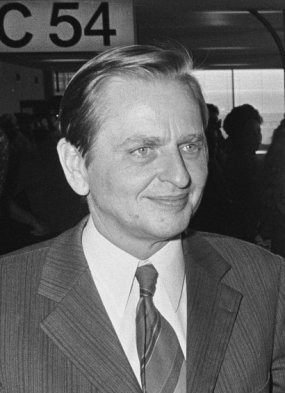
Olof Palme

- Voting was held in Sweden for the 349 seats in the Riksdag, the lower house of parliament. With 175 seats needed for a majority, the 175 to 175 split created by the 1973 election was resolved and a right-wing coalition took over from Prime Minister Olof Palme's socialist coalition of his own Social Democrats and the Left Party. Thorbjörn Fälldin's coalition of his own Centre Party (86 seats) with the Moderate Party (55 seats) and the People's Party (39 seats) won 180 seats overall.
- Thailand's former prime minister and dictator, General Thanom Kittikachorn, returned from exile and his arrival led to a wave of anti-government protests demanding that he leave the country again. Kittikachorn had led an authoritarian government for ten years before being ousted in 1973. He had been living in Singapore since an unsuccessful 3-day return to Thailand in 1974. Student demonstrations at Thammasat University would lead to a violent suppression 17 days later with more than 45 people killed by police on October 6.
- Pastors in East Germany's 4,300 Evangelical Christian churches read a pastoral letter as the Sunday sermon, calling for religious freedom and tolerance of activities outside of those allowed in the constitution of the German Democratic Republic (DDR). Although the DDR guaranteed freedom of private religious services, and permitted Protestant and Roman Catholic churches to operate hospitals and retirement homes, other laws prohibited parochial schools and religious instruction to children. Though not mandated, in practice, young adults who were members of church congregations were often barred from higher education within East Germany's university system. The pastoral letter was written following the August 20 incident of Reverend Oskar Bruesewitz setting himself on fire in public to protest the DDR's suppression of religion.
- Kim Yong Kyu, a Communist spy and official of the North Korean Workers Party, landed along with two armed guards at Geomun-do a remote island off the coast of South Korea, then decided to surrender to authorities there. When Kim's two bodyguards refused to go along with him, he shot and killed both of them, then surrendered to police the next day.
- Born:
  - Alison Sweeney, American TV actress, Daytime Emmy Award winner and later host of The Biggest Loser; in Los Angeles
  - Mikayil Jabbarov, Azerbaijan government minister and sports administrator; in Baku, Azerbaijan SSR, Soviet Union

== September 20, 1976 (Monday) ==
- The British Royal Navy minesweeper HMS Fittleton capsized and sank after a collision with a much larger frigate, HMS Mermaid in the North Sea. While 32 of the 44 members of the Royal Navy Reserve on board were saved, 12 drowned in the worst peacetime accident involving the reserve.
- Sweden's Prime Minister Olof Palme resigned after elections the day before had ended four decades of his party, the Socialdemokraterna.
- The two day 100 Club Punk Festival began, igniting the careers of several influential punk and post-punk bands, arguably sparking the punk movement's introduction into mainstream culture.
- Comedian Dick Van Dyke was given his own variety series with the premiere on NBC of Van Dyke and Company. Van Dyke's show was canceled after 11 episodes.
- Born:
  - Jon Bernthal, American TV actor known for The Walking Dead TV series; in Washington, D.C.
  - Suchita Trivedi, Indian TV actress and comedian known for Baa Bahoo Aur Baby; in Bombay (now Mumbai)
  - Enuka Okuma, Canadian TV actress, known for Madison, Sue Thomas: F.B.Eye, and Rookie Blue; in Vancouver
- Died:
  - Kermit Bloomgarden, 71, American theatrical producer who brought numerous plays to Broadway, including Death of a Salesman, The Diary of Anne Frank, The Music Man, Look Homeward, Angel, and Equus.
  - Dr. Robert Allan Phillips, 70, American physician "whose research led to therapies that helped save the lives of hundreds of cholera victims." Notably, Dr. Phillips led a team that developed a solution that patients could drink and which would become the standard therapy for cholera and similar diseases through rehydration and nutrition. As a result, the death rate from cholera dropped from 50 percent to only one percent.
  - Dan R. MacDonald, 65, Canadian composer who specialized in creating tunes designed to be performed as fiddle music rather than for the violin

== September 21, 1976 (Tuesday) ==
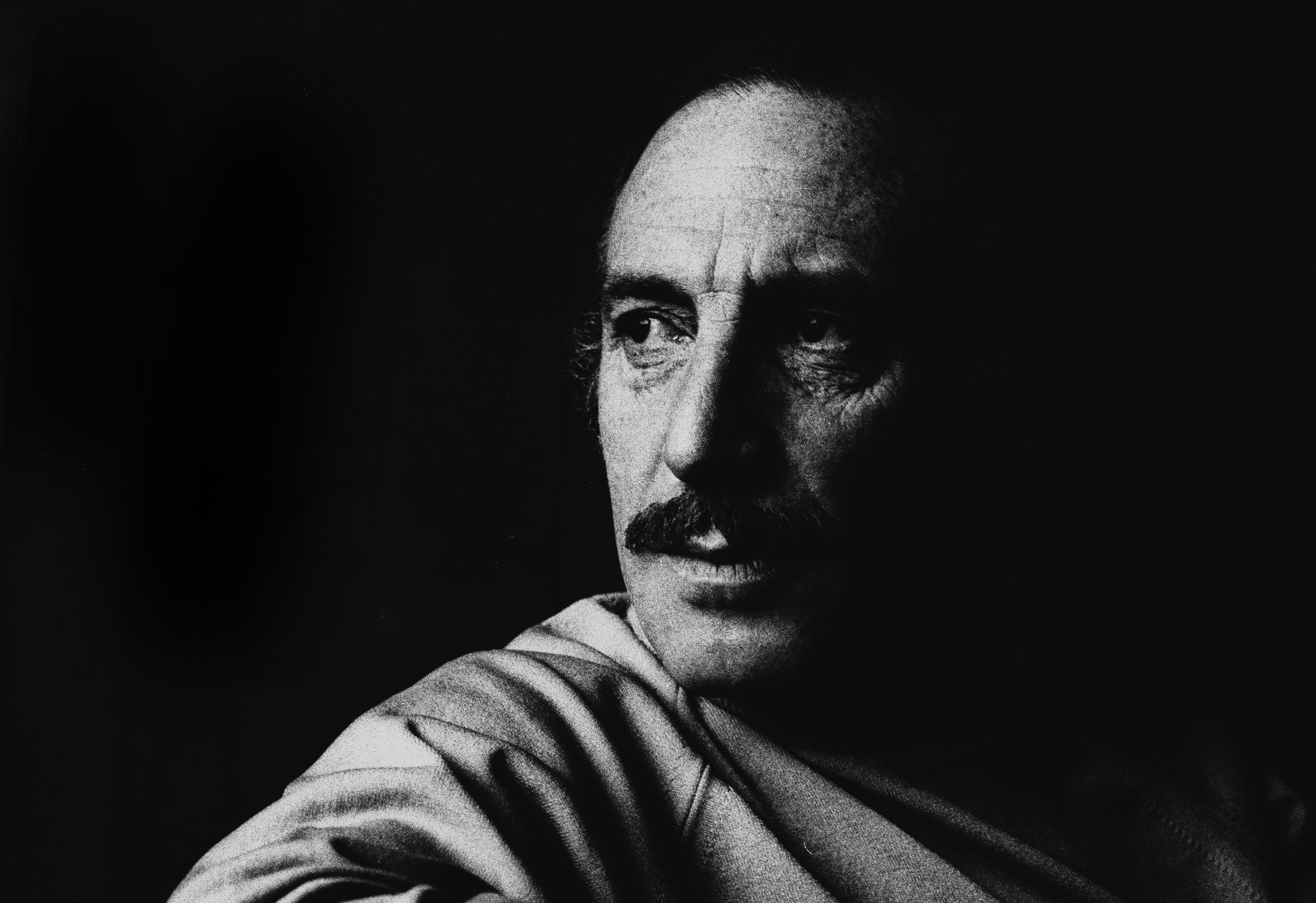
Letelier

- Orlando Letelier of Chile, who had served as the South American nation's Foreign Minister, Minister of the Interior and Defense Minister, as well as Chile's Ambassador to the United States, was assassinated by a car bomb in Washington, D.C. by agents of President Augusto Pinochet's secret police, the Dirección de Inteligencia Nacional (DINA). The blast which took place in front of the Romanian Embassy in Washington, also killed Letelier's co-worker at the Institute for Policy Studies, Ronni Karpen Moffitt. At 9:35 in the morning, as Letelier was driving to the Institute with Moffitt and her husband, a plastique bomb affixed beneath the car below the driver's seat, exploded, mortally wounding both Letelier and Moffitt. Michael Townley, a U.S. native who had worked for the Pinochet government, would later be convicted of carrying out the assassination.
- The Batasang Bayan was founded by the Government of the Philippines as a consultative advisory council to help word the decrees issued by President Ferdinand Marcos during his rule by decree during a period of martial law. The advisory council was abolished after two years, being discontinued on October 30, 1978.
- The Strømme Foundation was founded in Norway as a volunteer development organization to provide "microfinance" (small, low-interest loans) to impoverished people in the Third World to help them bring themselves out of poverty.
- Raymond Dingle and Charles H. Henry were granted U.S. Patent No. 3,982,207 for their invention of the quantum well laser under the title "Quantum Effects in Heterostructure Lasers" after applying on March 7, 1975.
- Born:
  - Olga Pogodina, Russian TV and film actress; in Moscow as Olga Stanislavovna Bobovich
  - Miguel Luque Ávila, Spanish swimmer and two time Olympic gold medalist; in Granollers, Catalonia
- Died: Benjamin Graham, 82, British-born American economist and investor known as "the father of value investing", co-author of the 1934 Security Analysis and author of the 1949 bestseller The Intelligent Investor

== September 22, 1976 (Wednesday) ==
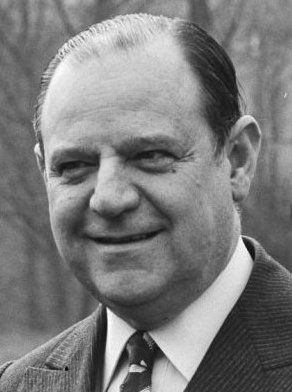
Barre

- France's Prime Minister Raymond Barre unveiled a strict plan for combating inflation including a 3-month price freeze, a sales tax reduction, and limits on wage and salary increases coupled with increased taxes on income, automobiles and luxuries.
- The American TV show Charlie's Angels premiered on the ABC television network and would air for five seasons and 115 episodes. After being introduced in a pilot film as the ABC Sunday Night Movie on March 21, 1976, the show starred Kate Jackson, Farrah Fawcett and Jaclyn Smith as three female detectives.
- Ball Four, a situation comedy about a fictitious minor league baseball team, premiered on CBS. Based on the 1970 book of the same name by former Major League Baseball pitcher Jim Bouton, the show starred Bouton himself as "Jim Barton" and ran for only seven episodes before being canceled.
- Maria Vladimirovna Romanov, great-granddaughter of Russia's Tsar Alexander II and the only child of Grand Duke Vladimir Kirillovich of Russia, pretender to the Russian throne, married Franz Wilhelm Hohenzollern, a great-grandson of Kaiser Wilhelm II, at a ceremony in Madrid. Franz Wilhelm converted to the Russian Orthodox faith and took the name of Grand Duke Mikhail Pavlovich upon marriage, but the two divorced in 1985 an he reverted to the official name of Prince Franz Wilhelm of Prussia.
- Born: Ya Wai Aung, Burmese film actor; in Myitkyina, Kachin State

== September 23, 1976 (Thursday) ==
- The first U.S. presidential debate since 1960 took place between incumbent President Gerald R. Ford and former Georgia Governor Jimmy Carter, the Republican and Democratic nominees respectively, in the U.S. presidential election, and was held at the Walnut Street Theatre in Philadelphia with NBC news commentator Edwin Newman as the moderator. With nine minutes left in the 90-minute debate, the sound system installed for the event suddenly failed as Carter was talking about the CIA and other intelligence agencies. Carter was interrupted as he said "Well, one of the very serious things that have happened in our government in recent years, and has continued up until now, is a breakdown in trust among our people in the..." For the next 27 minutes, the telecast, shown live on all U.S. television networks, was silent except for network commentary while Ford and Carter waited for power to be restored. The failure of a faulty electric part was identified by technicians at ABC television (which provided the network feed to the other U.S. networks) as the cause of the nearly half hour of silence.
- Élias Sarkis moved into the presidential palace in Beirut as President of Lebanon, four months after having been elected by the National Assembly on May 8, 1976. Although the oath of office had been administered to him in May and he had been making decisions, Suleiman Frangieh had refused to move from the palace until the expiration of his original six-year term. A unit of the army of neighboring Syria was allowed to protect the inauguration site, which was moved from Beirut, for the first time in Lebanon's history, and held in the town of Chtaura, 27 miles (43 km) away and located on the midway point of the highway between Beirut and the Syrian capital of Damascus.
- Soyuz 22 returned to Earth, slightly less than 8 days after having been launched for the purpose of photographing the surface of the Earth with a high resolution camera, the MKF-6, that was designed in East Germany to take photographs in "six spectral ranges."
- A fire aboard the Royal Navy guided missile destroyer RMS Glasgow killed eight men and injured four others while the new destroyer was being outfitted while in port at Newcastle-upon-Tyne in England.

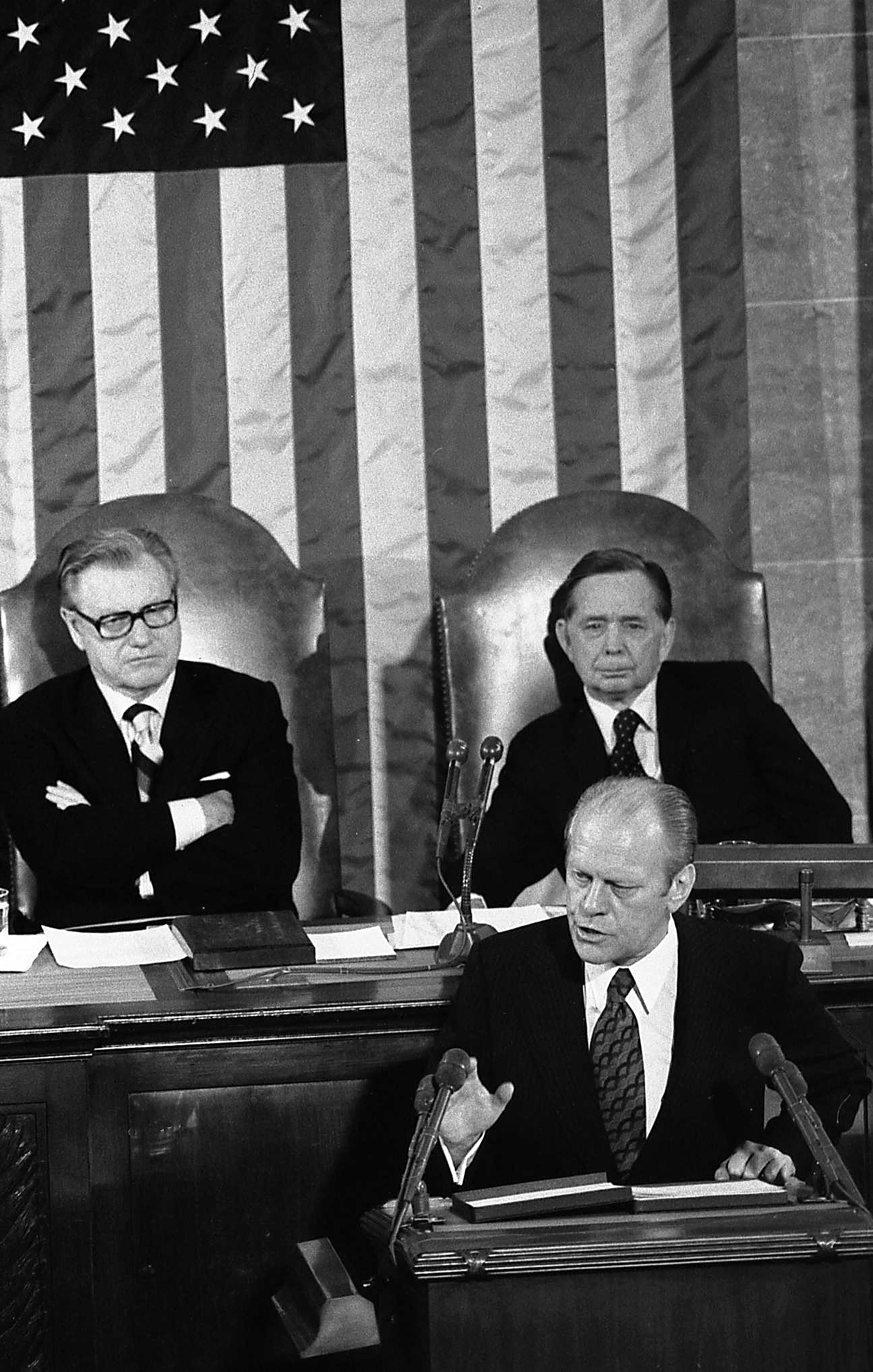
Rockefeller and Albert behind Gerald Ford

- U.S. Speaker of the House Carl Albert, who didn't realize that he was talking near a live microphone that was picking up his words, made a racist joke remark to U.S. Vice President Nelson Rockefeller prior to an address to a joint session of Congress by Liberian President William R. Tolbert. Rockefeller mentioned of Liberia, which had been founded by U.S. slaves in the 19th century, that "they've got a class system. The blacks that went back to Liberia and took on all the characteristics of Southern whites," then pointed to Edward W. Brooke, the only African-American U.S. Senator, and said "Ed Brooke is a one-man receiving committee. Albert joked, "Yeah, he'd be a slave if he were over there." Albert and Rockefeller, who was present in his vice-presidential role as President of the Senate, laughed at the remark. Albert and Rockefeller apologized to Senator Brooke the next day.
- Seni Pramoj announced that he was resigning as Prime Minister of Thailand after less than five months in office, after having been criticized for not preventing former Premier Thanom Kittikachorn from returning from exile. Less than 24 hours later, he reversed his decision and said that he had accepted an invitation to form a new government, adding "I accepted for the benefit, and the interests of the nation."
- The television show Baa Baa Black Sheep, later renamed Black Sheep Squadron, premiered on NBC and was based on the World War II experiences of Greg "Pappy" Boyington and his U.S. Marine Corps squadron of fighter pilots in the South Pacific. Robert Conrad starred as Boyington in the show, created by Stephen J. Cannell, which would run for two seasons.
- The Tony Randall Show, a situation comedy starring Tony Randall, premiered on CBS and would run for two seasons.
- Born:
  - Homaro Cantu, American chef and scientist who specialized in "molecular gastronomy"; in Tacoma, Washington (committed suicide 2015)
  - Halim Haryanto, Indonesian badminton player who won the world doubles championship (with Tony Gunawan in 2001) in Bandung, West Java

== September 24, 1976 (Friday) ==
- Patty Hearst was sentenced to seven years in prison for her role in a 1974 bank robbery. The sentence, which came despite pleas from Hearst and her attorneys for leniency because she had been a kidnap victim, "was even more severe than the Government had requested" by the prosecutor. Hearst had been kidnapped at gunpoint on February 4, 1974, by a terrorist group, the Symbionese Liberation Army, but then participated two months later on April 15 in the robbery of a branch of the Hibernia Bank in San Francisco. U.S. President Jimmy Carter would commute her sentence after only 22 months.
- After Rhodesia had its military support from South Africa withdrawn in the wake of the failure of Operation Eland, and announced that it would support a transition of Rhodesia to black majority rule, Prime Minister Ian Smith announced on television, that he agreed to the principle of majority rule, without specifying the extent of transition. Smith had reached the decision after meeting in Pretoria, South Africa with U.S. Secretary of State Henry Kissinger and South African Prime Minister John Vorster, and told viewers that an interim government would be set up with a "council of state" that "will have equal numbers of white and black members with a white chairman" and a requirement of a two-thirds majority for approval of any decisions, with the task of producing a constitution within two years to provide for a black majority government. Rhodesia would revert to colonial rule in 1979 and then become the black-ruled nation of Zimbabwe
- The Firearms Control Regulations Act, the strictest gun control legislation in the United States, went into effect in the District of Columbia. It banned residents from owning handguns, automatic firearms, or high-capacity semi-automatic firearms, as well as prohibited possession of unregistered firearms. Exceptions to the ban were allowed for police officers and guns registered before 1976. The law also required firearms kept in the home to be "unloaded, disassembled, or bound by a trigger lock or similar device"; The law would remain in effect for more than 30 years until June 26, 2008, in the historic case of District of Columbia v. Heller, the Supreme Court of the United States determined that the ban and trigger lock provisions violated the Second Amendment to the United States Constitution.
- Sir Ellis Clarke, who had taken office as the first President of Trinidad and Tobago when it became an independent republic on August 1, was certified by the nation's electoral college to a seven-year term of office.
- A retired Royal Navy officer, Lieutenant Commander Neil Rutherford, committed one of the deadliest mass killings in the history of Wales when he shot four people at the Red Gables Hotel in Penmaenmawr, set fire to the two story building, then shot himself.
- The first American college football game outside the United States was played in Tokyo between two historically black universities, as the Grambling State Tigers defeated the Morgan State Bears, 42 to 16.
- Born: Stephanie McMahon, American sports administrator and chief marketing official with World Wrestling Entertainment (WWE); in Hartford, Connecticut
- Died:
  - Philip Gbeho, 72, Ghanaian composer and musician, director of the National Symphony Orchestra Ghana (NSO Ghana) and composer of the African nation's national anthem, "God Bless Our Homeland Ghana"
  - John J. Emery, 78, American real estate developer who commissioned construction of the 49-story Carew Tower in 1931, at the time the tallest U.S. skyscraper west of the eastern seaboard.

== September 25, 1976 (Saturday) ==
- The Irish rock band U2 was formed after drummer Larry Mullen, Jr., then 14, posted a note seeking members for a band on the notice board of the Mount Temple Comprehensive School, his school in the Clontarf section of Dublin. Mullen was joined by vocalist Paul Hewson, better known by his stage name of "Bono"; brothers David Evans ("The Edge") and Dik Evans; and Adam Clayton. The band initially called itself "Feedback" and then "The Hype" before adopting the name "U2" in 1978.
- The championship game of the 12-team Victorian Football League was played in Melbourne and attended by 110,143 spectators. The Hawthorn Hawks defeated the North Melbourne Kangaroos, 100 to 70, to win the VFL title, the premier Australian rules football competition. Both teams are now part of the 18-team Australian Football League.
- Born:
  - Chauncey Billups, American professional basketball player, 2004 NBA Finals MVP; in Denver
  - Santigold (stage name for Santi White), American new wave singer; in Philadelphia

== September 26, 1976 (Sunday) ==
- Four Palestinian guerrillas, opposed to Syria's occupation of Lebanon, seized the Hotel Semiramis in Damascus and took 90 guests and workers hostage, before the Syrian Army stormed the building seven hours later and captured three of the four terrorists. Four of the hostages were killed in the gun battle, along with the leader of the guerrilla group, while another 34 hostages were wounded. The three terrorists were captured, then hung from a gallows outside the Hotel the next day.
- The crash of a Grumman Gulfstream II jet, owned by the Johnson & Johnson company, killed all 11 people on board. The eight passengers were four officers at J & J and their wives, all of whom were flying to a conference and vacation when the airplane went down while attempting to land near Hot Springs, Virginia. Earlier in the day, the crash of a U.S. Air Force KC-135 Stratotanker killed 15 of the 20 people on board when the aircraft, a military version of the Boeing 707, went down in a remote swamp near Alpena, Michigan and exploded and burned.
- Rhodesian Prime Minister Ian Smith's proposal for a two year transition to black majority rule was rejected by the presidents of five neighboring southern African nations (Zambia, Zaire, Tanzania, Mozambique and Angola) at a gathering of the five men hosted by Zambia's President Kenneth Kaunda.
- Born: Michael Ballack, German soccer football midfielder, Germany's Footballer of the Year in 2002, 2003 and 2005; in Görlitz, East Germany
- Died:
  - Leopold Ružička, 89, Croatian-born Swiss chemist and 1939 Nobel Prize in Chemistry winner
  - Pál Turán, 66, Hungarian mathematician and number theorist known for Turán's inequalities, the Turán sieve, the Turán–Kubilius inequality and the Erdős–Turán inequality

== September 27, 1976 (Monday) ==
- The government of Syria carried out the trial, conviction and public execution of the three surviving Palestinian guerrillas who had taken the guests and staff of the Semiramis Hotel the day before in Damascus. In an emergency meeting after midnight, the nation's Supreme State Court of Security tried the three men, found them guilty of "crimes against the security and integrity of our people", and issued a death sentence that was signed by President Hafez al-Assad. At daybreak, in order to make an example for future terrorists, the three men were driven back to the city square, where a wooden frame had been constructed in front of the hotel for the public execution, then hanged the men. The bodies, with posters attached, were left on display for the rest of the morning.
- Born: Francesco Totti, Italian soccer football midfielder, five-time Italian player of the year between 2000 and 2007; in Rome
- Died: Dr. Morris Fishbein, 87, editor of the Journal of the American Medical Association from 1924 to 1950, known for his campaigns against government health insurance and chiropractors, as well as against quackery before being removed from his post by vote of the AMA trustees in 1949.

== September 28, 1976 (Tuesday) ==
- The value of the British pound sterling against the U.S. dollar fell four cents, after falling two cents the day before, a 3½ percent decline in value over two days to only USD $1.63, its lowest level ever. The Bank of England moved to stem the decline after being contacted by Denis Healey, the Chancellor of the Exchequer. The all-time low for the pound sterling would happen on February 25, 1985, when the closing value would be slightly more than $1.05 per £1.
- The third Muhammad Ali vs. Ken Norton boxing bout took place as Ali, the defending world heavyweight boxing champion, had a rematch against Norton, against whom he had one loss and one win. The fight took place in front of 30,296 spectators at Yankee Stadium in New York. Although Norton landed more punches and with greater accuracy than Ali, neither man was able to knock down the other. Ali won the fight in a unanimous decision of the judges, who concluded that Ali outpointed Norton in 8 of the 15 rounds.
- A free live concert by the rock band Queen in London's Hyde Park, attracted 150,000 spectators. The event was sponsored by Richard Branson known at the time as the co-founder of Virgin Records.
- American singer Stevie Wonder released his hit album Songs in the Key of Life.
- Born: Fedor Emelianenko, Russian heavyweight mixed martial artist; in Rubizhne, Ukrainian SSR, Soviet Union
- Died: Raymond Collishaw, 82, Canadian pilot and fighting ace

== September 29, 1976 (Wednesday) ==
- The first elections for the 75 seats of the 145 member National Assembly of Transkei were held in advance of the nominal independence being granted to the area by the white minority government of the Union of South Africa. The Republic of Transkei, intended as by the South African government as an independent black "homeland" of bantustan for the Xhosa people, was created the following month. The 70 seats not subject to election in the Transkei parliament were reserved for the paramount chiefs within the Xhosa area.
- The United States Navy made its first test of the experimental BQM-108A warplane, designed for vertical takeoffs and landings for the ostensible purpose of having a fleet of fighter aircraft that could be dispersed to most ships at sea. The test was limited to an unmanned tethered flight and the project was discontinued.
- A musical by Trevor Nunn and Guy Woolfenden, based on William Shakespeare, The Comedy of Errors, premiered at the Royal Shakespeare Theatre in Stratford-upon-Avon in England., and later transferred to London's West End where it was staged at the Aldwych Theatre.
- Born: Andriy Shevchenko, Ukrainian soccer football striker. 2004 Ballon d'Or winner and all-time top goal scorer for the national team; later the manager of the Ukrainian team; in Dvirkivshchyna, Ukrainian SSR, Soviet Union
- Died: Feng Jinglan, 78, Chinese mineralogist

== September 30, 1976 (Thursday) ==
- The United States Centers for Disease Control began its nationwide program to vaccinate all Americans against the swine flu, with the first inoculations being administered at a health fair in Indianapolis, Indiana.
- In advance of the October 3 parliamentary elections in West Germany, incumbent Chancellor Helmut Schmidt and his challenger, Christian Democrat leader Helmut Kohl, engaged in a bitter debate.
- Ana Teresa Diego, 21, Argentine astronomer at the La Plata Astronomical Observatory became one of the many desaparecidos killed during Argentina's roundup of leftists during the Dirty War. She was seen in internment camps on two occasions but was never seen in public again. She would be mentioned by name in the 2011 inauguration speech of President Cristina Fernández de Kirchner. The asteroid 11441 Anadiego is named in her honor.
- The Nancy Walker Show, a situation comedy starring Nancy Walker, premiered on ABC, who was also playing a recurring character on the CBS situation comedy Rhoda and had recently had a supporting role as comic relief on the NBC detective series McMillan & Wife. Her show was canceled after 13 episodes.
- Died:
  - R. K. Shekhar (stage name for Rajagopala Kulashekharan), 43, Indian film score composer and conductor
  - Leanna Field Driftmier, 90, American radio personality whose Kitchen-Klatter homemaking hints show had been on the air since 1926. Although she turned over hosting duties to her daughter Lucile Driftmier Verness in 1959, she continued to make occasional appearances as a guest on the show.
