= Slay =

Slay may refer to:

- Murder, to commit homicide
- cause death, to terminate biological function of a living creature or object
- greatly impress or amuse (someone)

== People ==
- Brandon Slay, former American Olympic wrestler
- DJ Kay Slay (1966–2022), American hip hop DJ
- Dwayne Slay (born 1984), American football player
- Francis Slay (born 1955), mayor of St. Louis, Missouri, United States
- Frank Slay (1930–2017), American songwriter, record producer
- Jill Slay, British-Australian engineer and computer scientist
- Tamar Slay (born 1980), American basketball player
- Darius Slay (born 1991), American football player

== Other uses ==
- Slay (video game), a turn-based strategy video game
- SLAY Radio, an Internet radio station
- SLAY (novel), a 2019 young adult novel by Brittney Morris
- Slay (slang), a term of appreciation in LGBT slang
- "Slay" (song), a 2023 song by Everglow
- Slay, a song by Bonnie McKee from Hot City
- Slay, a song by YG from Stay Dangerous
- Slay (2024 film), a horror comedy film

== See also ==
- Slayer (disambiguation)
- Sleigh (disambiguation)
