= Mildred Sledge =

Mildred Sledge was an American screenwriter. She scripted several Texas Guinan movies. During two years she wrote seven Western themed screenplays in which she told the stories from a female perspective. The final Western screenplay she wrote was The Code of the West, a reconfiguration of Owen Wister's groundbreaking 1902 novel The Virginian.

== Filmography ==
- The Claws of Texas (1921)
- Code of Texas Storm (1921)
- The Heart of Texas (1921)
- The Soul of Texas (1921)
- The Girl of the Border
- Vengeance of Texas Grey
- Texas of the Mounted
- The Code of the West
