= James Scott Sledge =

James Scott Sledge has been appointed to the position of Chief Copyright Royalty Judge. He will serve a term of six years, subject to reappointment to additional terms.

Mr. Sledge recently retired as a United States bankruptcy judge in the Northern District of Alabama, where he served since 1991. As a federal judge in Northern Alabama, Judge Sledge presided over a heavy volume of cases, while he worked with national judges’ organizations.

Mr. Sledge was the chair of the Judicial Division of the American Bar Association, the largest judges’ organization in the world, and he was the first Article 1 judge to become the chair of the National Conference of Federal Trial Judges. In addition to his duties as a bankruptcy judge, he served twelve years on the Alabama State Council on the Arts, where he was chair for two years. Other arts jobs include service as a director on the regional Southern Arts Federation, representing Alabama, a director of the Alabama Symphony Orchestra and Alabama advocacy captain for Americans for the Arts.
