= Kinslayer =

Kinslayer may refer to:

- a person who commits parricide
- an epithet for Kenneth II of Scotland, in the Prophecy of Berchán
- Lews Therin Telamon, a character in Robert Jordan's Wheel of Time novels who killed his entire family
- Fëanor, a major character in J.R.R. Tolkien's Silmarillion, who led the first slaying of Elves by Elves.
- The Kinslayer Wars, an event in the Dragonlance series of novels, leading to the division between the Silvanesti and the Qualinesti elves
- "The Kinslayer", a song by Nightwish from their album Wishmaster
- Kinslayer is a term given to various characters in A Song of Ice and Fire, both within the story, such as Theon Greyjoy who is believed to have murdered two of his foster-brothers Bran Stark and Rickon Stark, and historical, Jonos Arryn, who murdered his brother Ronnel Arryn, a series of epic fantasy novels by the American novelist and screenwriter George R. R. Martin
- Kinslayer is a name of the book in Gotrek and Felix, series from Warhammer fantasy world
