= Sledging =

Sledging can mean:

- Sledding or sleighing
- Sledging (cricket), verbal abuse or comments meant to intimidate or put off an opposing batsman in cricket.
- Sledging (bodyboarding)
