= USS Ortolan (AMCU-34) =

Minesweeper of the United States Navy

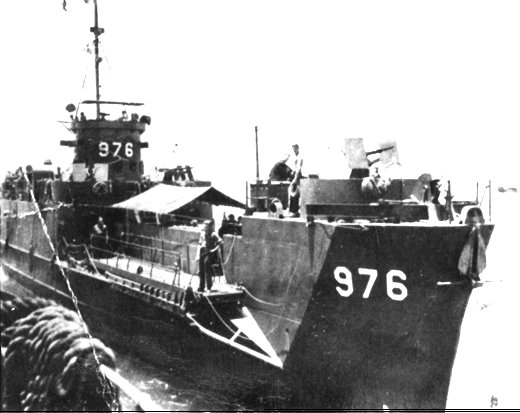
- No Photo Available

History

United States
- Name: USS Ortolan
- Builder: Consolidated Steel Corporation, Orange, Texas
- Laid down: 15 March 1944
- Launched: 10 April 1944
- Commissioned: 5 May 1944, as USS LCI(L)-976
- Decommissioned: 19 August 1946
- Recommissioned: 21 November 1953, as USS Ortolan (AMCU-34)
- Decommissioned: 23 June 1955
- Reclassified: LSIL-976, 28 February 1949; AMCU-34, 7 March 1952; MHC-34, 7 February 1955
- Stricken: 1 January 1960
- Honors and awards: 4 battle stars (World War II)
- Fate: Sold for scrap, 8 July 1960

General characteristics
- Class & type: LCI(L)-351-class large landing craft
- Displacement: 387 long tons (393 t) full
- Length: 159 ft (48 m)
- Beam: 23 ft 8 in (7.21 m)
- Draft: 5 ft 8 in (1.73 m)
- Propulsion: 8 × GM diesel engines (4 per shaft), 1,600 bhp (1,193 kW); 2 × variable pitch propellers
- Speed: 14.4 knots (26.7 km/h; 16.6 mph)
- Complement: 40
- Armament: 5 × single 20 mm AA guns

USS Ortolan (AMCU-34) was a LCI(L)-351-class large landing craft of the United States Navy, later converted to an AMCU-7-class coastal minesweeper.

The ship was laid down as LCI(L)–976 on 15 March 1944 by the Consolidated Steel Corporation, Orange, Texas, launched on 10 April 1944, and commissioned on 5 May 1944.

== World War II Pacific Theatre operations ==
Following fitting out at Galveston, Texas, LCI(L)–976 sailed on 2 June 1944, for the southwest Pacific and duty with the 7th Fleet. Arriving at Milne Bay, New Guinea, on 20 July, she transported troops and supplies and conducted training exercises during the next three months. In November, she got underway for the Philippine combat area. Sailing in a Leyte supply and reinforcement convoy on the 5th, she came under enemy fire for the first time on the 12th. After that day of air attacks off the Leyte assault beaches, she endured many more as she remained in the area until 6 December. On 7 December, she took the offensive and landed assault troops at Ormoc Bay. On the 15th, she conducted similar operations against Mindoro.

She departed Leyte Gulf again on 27 January 1945, and steamed back to Mindoro with reinforcements; then headed for Luzon with elements of the 11th Airborne Division embarked. On 5 February, as the battle to free Manila was beginning, she landed them at Nasugbu, south of the entrance to Manila Bay. From Luzon, the LCI(L) returned to Mindoro, thence to Leyte where she embarked troops of the Americal Division. Landing them at Talisay Point, Cebu, on 26 March, she remained in the area until sailing to land forces on Negros a month later. She then returned to Cebu whence she sailed to Leyte with Japanese POWs.

On 7 May, LCI(L)-976 got underway for a run to Mindanao, arriving at Zamboanga on the 10th and returning to Leyte on the 18th. Through June, she provided services in the Leyte area and during July and early August she transported troops to Panay and Cebu for mopping-up missions.

== End-of-war operations ==
Following the Japanese surrender in mid-August, occupation duties replaced combat operations. On 5 September, the landing craft got underway for Okinawa and Shanghai. Arriving at the latter on 29 September, she transported Chinese troops and supplies to Taiwan. Then, on 16 December, she sailed for the United States.

== Stateside duty ==
She arrived at San Pedro, California, on 31 January 1946. She reached New Orleans, Louisiana, on 3 June, decommissioned on 19 August 1946, and was reclassified as a coastal minesweeper, AMCU–34, on 7 March 1952. She was converted at the Charleston Naval Shipyard and was recommissioned on 21 November 1953 as USS Ortolan (AMCU-34). On 18 December, she reported for duty in the 5th Naval District where she was occupied with minehunting training exercises into 1954. On 3 March, she departed for Key West, Florida, to commence an extensive schedule of training and development exercises in which she was employed for the remainder of her active service.

== Decommissioning ==
Redesignated MHC-34, on 7 February 1955, Ortolan decommissioned, at Charleston, South Carolina, on 23 June 1955. Then assigned to the Florida Group, Atlantic Reserve Fleet, she was berthed at Green Cove Springs until struck from the Navy List on 1 January 1960, and sold, for scrapping, 8 July, to the Marlene Blouse Company.

== Awards ==
LCI(L)-976 earned four battle stars during World War II.
