= SLAY Radio =

Ownership
- Owner: Kenneth "Slaygon" Mutka

Links
- Webcast: URL Listen Live
- Website: www.slayradio.org

SLAY Radio is a 24/7 Swedish internet-only radio station dedicated to playing remixes and tunes based on music from the Commodore 64 computer, as well as the Amiga, popular in the 1980s and 1990s

The owner of the station, who started it in 1999 or 2000, is Kenneth Mutka, also known as Slaygon.

In late 2003, live shows started to air regularly, broadening the audience to people that did not have any relation at all to the Commodore 64. SLAY Radio has an active community. There are live shows where DJs and fans come together in an Internet Relay Chat channel and Discord while on air on YouTube and Twitch

SLAY Radio has been featured in numerous articles in newspapers such as Mikrobitti, GT (Swedish magazine), Computer Total (German magazine) and on Sveriges Radio.
