= Joseph Sledge =

American wrongly imprisoned prisoner (1942–2020)

Joseph Sledge Jr. (1942 – December, 1, 2020) was an American man who was wrongly convicted of the 1976 murders of 74-year-old Josephine Davis and 57-year-old Aileen Davis, for which he was imprisoned for over 36 years before being exonerated by new DNA evidence. His case represents the longest duration of incarceration for a case that has been overturned by DNA evidence, and he was the longest-serving inmate to have been exonerated in North Carolina.

== Case ==
On September 6, 1976, Josephine and Aileen Davis, who were mother and daughter, were found dead in Elizabethtown, North Carolina. Both had been beaten and stabbed multiple times.

Joseph Sledge, Jr., then 34 years old, who had escaped a day prior to the murders from minimum-security White Lake Prison Camp on September 5, was suspected by police, who issued a warrant for his arrest. Sledge was spotted on September 7 driving a stolen '69 Chevrolet in Fayetteville but eventually escaped on foot after an extended car chase. The next day he was arrested in Dillion and brought in for questioning. Sledge had been serving a 4-year sentence for misdemeanour larceny and claimed to have jumped the fence to escape the prison camp due to beatings and threats against his life. He led police to where he had escaped and showed them his escape route to where he had stolen the car. Sledge was sent back to prison. The police interviewed other prisoners who Sledge subsequently spent time in prison with following the murders, and in February, 1978 he was formally charged after two inmates, Herman Baker and Donnie Sutton, claimed that he had confessed to the crimes while in prison.

During the trial in May the same year, Sledge denied that he had committed the crimes, and after two days of deliberation, the trial resulted in a hung jury. Sledge was set on trial again in August, 1978; however, this time the jury convicted him of second-degree murder and he received two back-to-back life sentences. He appealed to the North Carolina Supreme Court the next year, but his efforts failed to acquit him of the crime.

Sledge continued to file post-conviction motions from prison, declining help from a lawyer. He eventually filed over 25 of these from prison over the length of his incarceration, one of which was a sworn statement by a former inmate of Herman Baker, who claimed that Baker had admitted to having lied under oath as a result of police coercion and promised favors. However, none of these motions succeeded in bringing about an investigation into his exoneration. In 2003, Sledge requested that DNA testing be conducted on the hairs and other evidence found from the case, however, some of the evidence had gone missing, and it was not until 2012 that the evidence surfaced and was tested. Mitochondrial DNA testing of pubic hair evidence did not match Sledge. In 2013 Baker came forward and he recanted his story, saying that his testimony had been false and that he and Sutton had lied about receiving special treatment and a share of the $5000 reward which the Governor's Office had offered in return for information leading to arrest and conviction. He admitted that he was promised early parole and $3000, which he received. Additionally, Baker claimed that police had described the scene to him so that his testimony would be believable. Sutton was deceased by this time, but records show that he also received early parole and a reward of $2,000. The North Carolina Center on Actual Innocence, who helped to investigate the case, also learned that the prosecution had not shown to the jury key evidence that put Sledge's guilt in doubt. For instance, in initial interviews with Sutton, he had denied that Sledge had admitted the crime and only later changed his story. They also discovered that during the case the prosecution had also failed to tell the jury that there was a second suspect who lived 500 yards away, where a shoe print was found that resembled the bloody prints found at the Davis house where the two women were killed.

On January 25, 2015, Sledge was declared 'factually innocent' by a panel of three North Carolina Superior Court Judges, and was released. He had been in prison for the crime for over 36 years, making Sledge the longest serving inmate exonerated by DNA evidence, and the longest serving inmate exonerated in North Carolina. The decision was made that Sledge would receive $750,000 in recompense for wrongful incarceration. The current District Attorney of Bladen County, although he was not the prosecutor at the time of the original trials, apologised to Sledge, saying “There's nothing worse for a prosecutor than convicting an innocent person.” He also stated that the case would be re-opened to find the real killer.

== Improper testing of evidence ==
Christine Mumma, the director of the North Carolina Center on Actual Innocence, was accused of inappropriate professional conduct in the case after she took a water bottle from the home of Marie Andrus and had DNA tests performed without her permission. Mumma received an official admonition, the lowest form of warning available to the disciplinary panel. The evidence came back inconclusive and was not used to exonerate Sledge.

== Release ==
Joseph Sledge is the eighth inmate to be freed based on the investigations of the North Carolina Center on Actual Innocence.

Days before his eventual exoneration, Caroline Brown, granddaughter of victim Josephine Davis, expressed her disgust with the possibility of his impending release, still believing him to be guilty.

In an interview after he was released, Sledge stated:

My personal opinion is that they made me the scapegoat because they had no one to blame. And being that I had been an escapee from the prison unit when these two ladies were killed, they kind of fixed it in a manner to make me look like the perpetrator.

— Joseph Sledge,

He also expressed his opinion that the practice of using hair analysis as evidence of guilt in a crime should be abolished.

== Lawsuits ==
Sledge later sued those who prosecuted his case, blaming nine people, as well as Columbus County Clerk of Court, the Bladen County Sheriff’s Office and the State Bureau of Investigation for with holding or failing to find DNA evidence that would have exonerated him much earlier. The Bladen County sheriff’s office eventually settled the suit against them, paying Sledge $4 million. Additional lawsuits continue against the State of North Carolina for the actions of the SBI and Clerk's Office, whom Sledge alleges ignored his pleas for DNA testing.

== See also ==
- Exoneration
- List of wrongful convictions in the United States
