= Masters of Harmony =

Californian band

The Masters of Harmony is a 70-member men's chorus, based in Greater Los Angeles, California. Winner of eight consecutive gold medals (1990–2011) in international barbershop chorus competitions, the group possesses a diverse repertoire encompassing not only barbershop music but also classical, jazz, patriotic, sacred, standards and Broadway pops, and sings for various groups and organizations throughout the greater Los Angeles, California metropolitan area. The chorus won another barbershop international competition in 2017, bringing their total gold medal count to nine.

== History ==
The Masters of Harmony began in the mid-1980s when a small group of barbershop singers from the Pasadena, California Chapter of the Barbershop Harmony Society (SPEBSQSA, Inc.) decided to break away and start a new chapter "dedicated to musical excellence," a phrase that became its slogan. The group obtained a chapter license in the spring of 1985 and then its charter at the Far Western District barbershop singing convention in October 1985. The chapter's original name, Foothill Cities, was derived from the series of towns that ran along the southern base of the San Gabriel Mountains, an area where most of the organizers then lived. In 1987 the chapter relocated its rehearsals to the Town Center in the City of Santa Fe Springs, California, and in 1998 changed its official name to that of the Santa Fe Springs Chapter. This relationship ended in 2019 and the chapter has now changed its official name to the Greater Los Angeles Chapter. Over the course of its existence, the chorus has been led by five primary music directors: Dr. Greg Lyne (1987–1996), Jeff Oxley (1998–1999), Mark Hale (2000–2012), Justin Miller (2012–2019), and Alan Gordon (2019–present).

== Contest successes ==
Under the directorship of Dr. Lyne, in October 1988 the Masters of Harmony won the Far Western District chorus contest, thus qualifying for the Society-wide annual competition the following year. In July 1989 the chorus placed fourth at the international contest held in Kansas City, Missouri. The next year, in July 1990 in San Francisco, the chorus won the international chorus championship in a dramatic tiebreaker against the Louisville Thoroughbreds. In July 1993, when the chorus was next eligible to compete, it again won the international championship, this time in Calgary, Alberta, Canada. Three years later, in July 1996 in Salt Lake City, Utah, the chorus achieved its third international chorus championship.

At the 1999 international competition in Anaheim, California, the Masters of Harmony, now directed by Jeff Oxley, won its fourth consecutive chorus championship. On April 1, 2000, Mark Hale was appointed the new music director and led the chorus to four more consecutive victories: 2002 (Portland, Oregon), 2005 (Salt Lake City, Utah), 2008 (Nashville, Tennessee), and 2011 (Kansas City, Missouri).

In early 2012, Hale announced that he would retire as director following the chorus's performances as reigning champion at the July 2012 international convention in Portland, Oregon, and in August of that year Justin Miller was appointed the new director of the Masters of Harmony.

The chorus next competed at the July 2014 International Chorus Contest in Las Vegas, Nevada, finishing in second place under the direction of Justin Miller. The silver-medal performance scored 2854 out of a possible 3000 points (95.1%) and ranks among the best in the history of the chorus.

At the July 2016 International Chorus Contest in Nashville, Tennessee, the chorus earned third-place under the direction of Justin Miller. The bronze-medal performance scored 2783 out of a possible 3000 points (94.0%). The following year in Las Vegas, the chorus earned first place with a score of 2893 (96.4%), only 8 points more than their closest competitor.

At the 2022 International Chorus Contest in Charlotte, North Carolina, the chorus competed and placed sixth.

== Quartet successes ==
On three occasions, quartets consisting of four active chorus members of the Masters of Harmony won the International Quartet Championship: Nightlife (1996), OC Times (2008), and Masterpiece (2013). Three other International Champion Quartets won while some of their members were also active with the chorus: Revival (1998), Michigan Jake (2001), and Gotcha! (2004). On two occasions the International College Quartet Championship was won by quartets consisting of young men who were all active members of the Masters of Harmony: The Vagrants (2009) and The Newfangled Four (2013), and many other chorus members have sung in quartets which have won District championships.

== Community outreach ==
Since 2001, the Masters of Harmony have organized and sponsored an annual "Young Men's Harmony Festival" that brings together nearly 200 young men from high schools throughout Southern California for a day-long clinic and rehearsal, followed by an evening performance for the public.

This program has been endorsed by the Southern California Vocal Association (SCVA), a professional organization of choral music teachers that serves the Southern California area. Mark Freedkin has been the driving force for this activity since 1995. As a result of his efforts, the SCVA created the new position of "VP of Barbershop Harmony Festivals" and named Freedkin to serve in that role.

== Awards and recognition ==
Preceded by Ambassadors of Harmony	SPEBSQSA International Chorus Champions; 2017	Succeeded by Vocal Majority
Preceded by Westminster Chorus	SPEBSQSA International Chorus Champions; 2011	Succeeded by Ambassadors of Harmony
Preceded by Westminster Chorus	SPEBSQSA International Chorus Champions; 2008	Succeeded by Ambassadors of Harmony
Preceded by Ambassadors of Harmony	SPEBSQSA International Chorus Champions; 2005	Succeeded by Vocal Majority
Preceded by New Tradition Chorus	SPEBSQSA International Chorus Champions; 2002	Succeeded by Vocal Majority
Preceded by Alexandria Harmonizers	SPEBSQSA International Chorus Champions; 1999	Succeeded by Vocal Majority
Preceded by Alexandria Harmonizers	SPEBSQSA International Chorus Champions; 1996	Succeeded by Vocal Majority
Preceded by Southern Gateway Chorus	SPEBSQSA International Chorus Champions; 1993	Succeeded by Vocal Majority
Preceded by Alexandria Harmonizers	SPEBSQSA International Chorus Champions; 1990	Succeeded by Vocal Majority
