= Toronto Northern Lights =

Toronto, Ontario-based men's chorus

The Toronto Northern Lights (TNL) is a Toronto, Ontario-based men's chorus of about 75 singers drawn from the Ontario District of the Barbershop Harmony Society. They won the title of Barbershop Harmony Society International Chorus Champions in July 2013 by a margin of two points over the two-time champion Westminster Chorus. The chorus had also earned the silver medal at five consecutive International Chorus Competitions (2001 to 2005), as well as bronze medals in 2000, 2006, 2007, 2009, 2010, and 2011.

With 34 men on stage in Kansas City in 2000, they were recognized as the smallest chorus to ever receive a medal at the International Competition and have been considered instrumental in shifting the perception that a smaller chorus could not compete at the highest levels within the singing society.

TNL's expansive repertoire ranges from Barbershop to Broadway, Vocal Jazz to Doo-Wop, and from Gershwin to the Beatles.

TNL have been guest performers in Dortmund, Germany in March 2006 at the BinG! (Barbershop in Germany) convention and at the BABS (British Association of Barbershop Singers) convention in Cheltenham, England in May 2008. In August 2010, they participated in the Vocal International Music Festival in Venray, Holland hosted by the Venray Mannenkorps as part of their 100th anniversary. In September 2012, the group traveled to Beijing, China and performed in the Forbidden City Concert Hall and on the Great Wall of China. In the spring of 2015, the chorus traveled to Derby, England, Landau, Germany, and finally Stockholm and Nykoping, Sweden, as guests on various shows and the special guest at the Society of Nordic Barbershop Singers convention in Sweden.

Although Toronto is their home base, the chorus draws members from a large area, up to 200 miles, for rehearsals. Members hail from as far as Buffalo, to Ottawa, to Detroit.

The chorus attracts members from a wide range of ages, backgrounds and employment; from twenty-year-old university students, to business professionals and to men in retirement.

The chorus had released five CDs as of 2012.

The Toronto Northern Lights CD titled The Sky's The Limit was recorded at Metalworks Studios in Mississauga, Ontario.

== Discography ==
- The Best of Disney (2023)
Tracks

- "When You Wish Upon A Star"
- "Gaston"
- "Little Toot"
- "Under the Sea"
- "When I See An Elephant Fly"
- "Pecos Bill"
- "You've Got a Friend in Me"
- "Minnie's Yoo-Hoo"
- "Steamboat Bill"
- "Johnny Fedora and Alice Blue Bonnet"
- "Friend Like Me"
- "Winnie the Pooh"
- "Heigh-Ho"
- "Heffalumps & Woozles"
- "Casey Jr."
- "In Summer"
- "Woody's Roundup"
- "Alice in Wonderland"
- "Try a Little Something New"
- "Paul Bunyan"
- "Frozen Heart"
- "Circle of Life" (with Power Play)
- "Blue Shadows on the Trail"

- Dare to Dream (2011)
Tracks

- "Come On, Get Happy"
- "Cross the Mason-Dixon Line"
- "I'll Get By"
- "Bad Day"
- "Maria"
- "Everything's Coming Up Roses"
- "When You Wish Upon A Star"
- "Alexander's Ragtime Band"
- "Brahms' Lullabye"
- "Goodbye World, Goodbye"
- "Over The Rainbow"
- "Bohemian Rhapsody"

- Songs for the Season (2007)
Tracks

- "It's the Most Wonderful Time of the Year"
- "Merry Christmas, Darling"
- "Huron Carol"
- "Come & See What's Hap'nin' in the Barn"
- "What Sweeter Music"
- "Happy Holiday / Holiday Season Medley"
- "God Rest Ye Merry Gentlemen"
- "Caroling, Caroling"
- "Low How a Rose E'er Blooming"
- "You're a Mean One Mr. Grinch"
- "Silent Night"
- "I've Got My Love to Keep Me Warm"
- "Have Yourself a Merry Little Christmas"

- The Sky's the Limit! (2005)
Tracks

- "Alabamy Bound"
- "Louise"
- "The Prayer" (John Mallett soloist)
- "Tonight"
- "It's Impossible"
- "King of Spain"
- "Right from the Start"
- "Polka Dots and Moonbeams"
- "Who Will Buy"
- "All the World Will Be Jealous of Me"
- "Yes Sir, That's My Baby"
- "Circle of Life" (with Power Play)

- Brother Can You Spare a Dime? (2002)
Tracks

- "Sentimental Gentleman from Georgia"
- "In the Still of the Night" (Kern Lewin soloist)
- "She's Like the Swallow"
- "This Little Light of Mine"
- "Something"
- "Embraceable You" (solo: Moya Horan)
- "It Had To Be You"
- "Lover Come Back"
- "Anthems" / "Ode to Joy" (featured quartet: Acoustix)
- "Daddy Sang Bass"
- "Guys and Dolls Medley" (various soloists)
- "Fugue for Tinhorns"
- "Luck Be a Lady"
- "Adelaide's Lament"
- "Sit Down, You're Rockin' the Boat"
- "Nobody Knows You When You're Down and Out"
- "Brother, Can You Spare a Dime?"

- Do You Hear the People Sing? (2000)
Tracks

- "Orange Coloured Sky"
- "Do You Know What it Means to Miss New Orleans"
- "Lonesome That's All"
- "The Longest Time"
- "Their Hearts Were Full of Spring"
- "Don't Break The Heart That Loves You"
- "When You and I Were Young Maggie"
- "South Rampart Street Parade"
- "When Day Is Done"
- Les Misérables Montage

"Look Down"
"At The End of The Day"
"I Dreamed a Dream"
"Castle On a Cloud"
"Master of the House"
"On My Own"
"Damn Their Warnings"
"Drink With Me"
"Bring Him Home"
"Empty Chairs at Empty Tables"
"Do You Hear the People Sing"

== Awards and recognition ==
Year	Award	Contest	Location and Date
1998	District Champions	Ontario District Chorus Competition	Toronto, Ontario; October 24, 1998
2000	Winner	CBC / Radio-Canada National Radio Competition for Amateur Choirs (Cultural Traditions Category)	
2000	5th place bronze medalists	Barbershop Harmony Society International Competition	Kansas City, Missouri; July 8, 2000
2001	2nd place silver medalists	Barbershop Harmony Society International Competition	Nashville, Tennessee; July 7, 2001
2002	2nd place silver medalists	Barbershop Harmony Society International Competition	Portland, Oregon; July 6, 2002
2003	2nd place silver medalists	Barbershop Harmony Society International Competition	Montreal, Quebec; July 5, 2003
2004	2nd place silver medalists	Barbershop Harmony Society International Competition	Louisville, Kentucky; July 3, 2004
2005	2nd place silver medalists	Barbershop Harmony Society International Competition	Salt Lake City, Utah; July 9, 2005
2006	3rd place bronze medalists	Barbershop Harmony Society International Competition	Indianapolis, Indiana; July 7, 2006
2007	4th place bronze medalists	Barbershop Harmony Society International Competition	Denver, Colorado; July 6, 2007
2009	5th place bronze medalists	Barbershop Harmony Society International Competition	Anaheim, California; July 3, 2009
2010	3rd place bronze medalists	Barbershop Harmony Society International Competition	Philadelphia, Pennsylvania; July 8, 2010
2011	3rd place bronze medalists (tied)	Barbershop Harmony Society International Competition	Kansas City, Missouri; July 6, 2011
2013	1st place gold medalists	Barbershop Harmony Society International Competition	Toronto, Ontario, Canada; July 5, 2013
2016	4th place bronze medalists	Barbershop Harmony Society International Competition	Nashville, Tennessee; July 8, 2016
2017	4th place bronze medalists	Barbershop Harmony Society International Competition	Las Vegas, Nevada; July 7, 2017
2019	5th place bronze medalists	Barbershop Harmony Society International Competition	Salt Lake City, Utah; July 5, 2019

Preceded by Ambassadors of Harmony	Barbershop Harmony Society International Chorus Champions; 2013	Succeeded by Vocal Majority
