= Chorus of the Chesapeake =

American all-male a cappella chorus

- Origin: Dundalk, Maryland, USA
- Genres: a cappella
- Years active: 1957–present
- Website: www.dundalk.org

The Chorus of the Chesapeake is a men's a cappella chorus, based in Dundalk, Maryland. Chartered in 1957 as the Dundalk chapter of the Barbershop Harmony Society, the chorus is rich in both history and accomplishment.

== Early history ==
In the late 1950s, some barbershop singers in the Baltimore area expressed an interest in starting a chorus that would dedicate itself to both musical excellence and community service. After choosing the working class Baltimore suburb of Dundalk as a location, the search for singers began. With Bob Johnson as their first director, the Dundalk chapter chartered in 1957, under the name Chorus of the Chesapeake. Within a year the ranks of the chorus had swelled to over 150 men, with Bob Johnson leading them in many singing events, activities, and community events. They competed in their first contest in the Mid-Atlantic District in 1960, qualifying to go to International contest the following summer in Philadelphia. In July 1961, 156 men of the chorus traveled to the contest, then the largest chorus by far to have competed on the International stage. (The Ambassadors of Harmony won in 2004 with 160 singers.) They ran away with the International championship on their first attempt, edging out the Thoroughbreds chorus from Louisville, Kentucky by a sizable margin.

After their first victory in 1961, the chorus did not qualify for International the next few years, and membership began to slowly dwindle. In 1963, Bob Johnson accepted a position working for the Barbershop Harmony Society as a music specialist, and relocated to Kenosha, Wisconsin. This left the Dundalk chapter with the responsibility of finding the man who could replace Johnson as music director. For a while, Clarence Wrobleski, band director at Patterson Senior High School took the reins. Later, Fred King, a brash, young music teacher who had been directing the Catonsville chapter came to the attention of the Dundalk board.

== Freddie King ==
In 1966, Fred King assumed directorship of the chorus, which had been struggling with diminishing membership and musical success. Although he was very young and did not have the pedigree of a seasoned barbershop director, Johnson trusted that King was the right man to lead the chorus toward more success. Freddie, as he was called, injected a new energy into the chorus, and quickly became a student of directing technique and vocal craft. His quartet, The Oriole Four, had already won the Mid-Atlantic District championship in 1958, and competed several times at the International level, making the top 20 and the top 10. As the quartet continued to climb the ranks, so did the performance level of the chorus. They continued to be one of the Society's "Century" chapters with more than 100 members. The chorus once again qualified for International contest in the fall of 1970, only months after The Oriole Four had won the International Quartet Championship in Atlantic City, New Jersey. They traveled to New Orleans, Louisiana in July 1971, with 139 singers, and walked away with their second International Championship. Freddie King had joined the elite of the barbershop world. In October 1971, the chorus sang the National Anthem at game one of baseball's World Series in Baltimore. In 1983, Fred's young student Mike Rowe, later known for hosting the Discovery Channel program Dirty Jobs from 2003 to 2012, joined the chorus for a brief time and competed at several district and division contests with the chorus.

== Recent history ==
Freddie King retired as musical director in 1996, and the chorus was directed for several years by Jim Kraus, a former music student of King's in the Baltimore County school system. The chorus maintained around 50 members of the performing chorus, and hovered between 6th and 10th place in the Mid-Atlantic District chorus contests. Jim departed in 2003 and was replaced by Rick Taylor, who had directed many choruses in the past and had won several International Quartet bronze medals with the quartets BSQ and Riptide. The chorus grew in membership, with many formerly inactive singers returning.

In October 2006, the chorus staged 109 singers for the Mid-Atlantic District contest and placed third, earning an 81.8% average. This score was high enough to earn a wild card invitation to the 2007 International Chorus contest, held at the Pepsi Center in Denver, Colorado on July 6, 2007. The chorus went on to place 16th in the world at the contest, with 140 men on stage and an emotionally charged presentation of the song Auld Lang Syne.

In October 2007, the chorus competed in the Mid-Atlantic District contest with 130 men on stage and again qualified for international competition, the first time it had done so for two years in a row. The chorus competed at the 2008 Internationals in Nashville, Tennessee and placed 15th.

After competing in October 2008, the chorus qualified for the 2009 International contest in Anaheim, California, but declined the invitation to take a year off following the untimely death of Fred King on September 1, 2008.

In October 2009, the chorus competed at the Mid-Atlantic District contest and qualified for a wild card invitation to the 2010 International Contest, held in Philadelphia, where they finished 18th.

The chorus competed at the 2013 International Contest, held in Toronto on July 5, 2013, placing 21st.

In January 2016, director Rick Taylor announced his departure for a new job with the BHS's charitable organization, Harmony Foundation International. After a brief director search, it was announced on February 3, 2016, that Kevin King, the son of Freddie King, would be the new director of the chorus.

== Awards and recognition ==
Preceded by Dapper Dans of Harmony	SPEBSQSA International Chorus Champions; 1971	Succeeded by Phoenicians
Preceded by Chordsman	SPEBSQSA International Chorus Champions; 1961	Succeeded by Thoroughbreds

== See also ==
- Barbershop Harmony Society
- Barbershop music
- A cappella music
