= Northwest Vocal Project =

American all-male a cappella chorus

The Northwest Vocal Project (NVP) is a men's a cappella chorus based in Seattle, Washington. Founded by young singers in the area, the chorus placed first in the Barbershop Harmony Society Youth Chorus Festival twice, and have grown from a small fraternity of young singers to a full-fledged chorus who compete internationally.

== History ==
The concept of the NVP began in the summer of 2007, when three young singers were discussing a recent youth movement in barbershop. With the help of a neighboring chorus (Northwest Sound in Bellevue, Washington), the young men contacted numerous other singers in the area and scheduled an initial meeting.

For the first year of the chorus's existence, Northwest Sound director Don Rose donated his time and efforts to lead the new, young group to their first performance opportunity, the first annual Youth Chorus Festival (YCF) held in January 2008 in San Antonio, Texas. The new group made a respectable showing their first year, achieving an Excellent rating. Don continued to direct the chorus for an additional year, taking the chorus to its first Barbershop Harmony Society (BHS) Evergreen District Contest in the fall of 2008, placing third in a field of sixteen choruses with a score average of 76.3. They then went on to improve upon their previous placement at the second annual YCF in Pasadena, California, in January 2009, earning a Superior rating and the overall Grand Championship.

Following the chorus's win in Pasadena, Rose decided to step down as director in order to focus on both Northwest Sound and his career as a music educator. The chorus found new talent in Tim Marron, who directed them as reigning YCF Champions in performances at the BHS's summer International convention in Anaheim, California, in July 2009. Tim stepped down shortly afterward due to family and job commitments.

The chorus sought out Neal Booth to become their next director. Neal had been a part of the project since the beginning, serving as both a coach and a substitute/interim director. His energetic approach brought much improvement to the chorus. In 2009 in their second BHS Evergreen District Competition, the chorus placed first with a very high 83.3% average, qualifying them for the 2010 BHS International Chorus Contest in Philadelphia, Pennsylvania. In that contest, they wowed the crowd with a very skillful package and placed 12th with an 84.5% average. The following fall they once again earned the chorus championship in their Evergreen District, but they opted to sit out of the 2011 International in Kansas City, Missouri, to return to the YCF, which was to be held in Las Vegas, Nevada, in January 2011. At the festival, they became the only youth chorus in history to win a second title. In 2011 they returned to claim their 3rd straight District win in Spokane. They are currently entered to compete at the Evergreen District contest once again in September 2012, in Spokane, Washington.

== Philosophy ==
NVP takes a different approach to their chorus philosophy and mission than many of the older, more traditional BHS chapters. They identify much more as a fraternity of singers who pride themselves on providing an environment of both hard work and a fun atmosphere. They perform a wide variety of styles within a cappella music, including traditional barbershop, jazz, Broadway, and light classical.

The chorus also schedules numerous non-musical social activities for its members, such as pick-up games of basketball, football, or frisbee, a Halo 3 tournament, Rock Band showdowns, or paintball battles. A great deal of emphasis is placed on camaraderie and togetherness.

== Selection of Songs ==
- Sweet Georgia Brown 2009
- Wade in the Water 2009
- When She Loved Me 2010
- Loch Lomond 2010
- Not While I'm Around (Sweeny Todd) 2011
