= Vocal Spectrum =

American barbershop quartet

- Genre: Barbershop
- Years active: 2003–present
- Members: Tim Waurick – tenor Eric Dalbey – lead Jonny Moroni – baritone Chris Hallam – bass
- Past members: David Cassel – tenor (2003)
- Website: Official site

Vocal Spectrum is a barbershop quartet from St. Charles, Missouri. In 2004, Vocal Spectrum won the Barbershop Harmony Society's International Collegiate Quartet Contest, and on July 8, 2006, they became International Champions, winning the society's International Quartet Contest. A distinctive feature of the quartet is tenor Tim Waurick's ability to sustain notes for upwards of 30 seconds, and the tenor's and lead's incredibly high vocal range, featured in many of the group's recordings and live shows.

The quartet's run for the title is featured in the 2009 feature documentary American Harmony.

== Background ==
Vocal Spectrum began singing together in September 2003. Each member has graduated from Lindenwood University in St. Charles. Each member is also a member of Ambassadors of Harmony, the International Chorus Champion of 2004, 2009, 2012, 2016, 2023, and 2026. As of the 2006 International Quartet Contest, Vocal Spectrum is the only quartet in history to capture three of the then-four (now five) possible BHS gold medals (Collegiate Quartet, Quartet, Chorus [as members of the Ambassadors of Harmony]).

The only championship that remains for Vocal Spectrum to win is the Barbershop Harmony Society's Senior quartet contest for which they will not become eligible until at least the 2030s (no member of a competing Senior Quartet can be younger than 55 years old, and the aggregate age of the quartet must equal or exceed 240 years [average age 60 or greater]).

On July 8, 2023, the quartet was inducted into the Barbershop Harmony Society's Hall of Fame.

== Members ==
- Tim Waurick – tenor
  - Tenor Section Leader of Ambassadors of Harmony
  - Produces "TimTracks" barbershop learning tapes for Ambassadors of Harmony and other groups
  - Member of the Fantasy Gold Quartet along with Jeff Oxley, Tony DeRosa, and Joe Connelly
- Eric Dalbey – lead
  - Lead Section Leader of Ambassadors of Harmony
  - Common soloist for Ambassadors of Harmony
- Jonny Moroni – baritone
  - Baritone Section Leader of Ambassadors of Harmony
  - Co-Director of Ambassadors of Harmony
  - Director of Ambassadors of Harmony
- Chris Hallam – bass
  - Performing member of Ambassadors of Harmony

== Awards ==
The group's Vocal Spectrum II recording was awarded "Best Barbershop Album" by the Contemporary A Cappella Society in April 2009. The album's single, Go the Distance, also won as "Best Barbershop Song".

== Discography ==
- 2006 – Vocal Spectrum
- 2008 – Vocal Spectrum II
- 2011 – Vocal Spectrum III
- 2013 – Vocal Spectrum IV (now Vocal Spectrum Christmas)
- 2016 – Vocal Spectrum V
- 2026 – Vocal Spectrum VI

== See also ==
- Barbershop music
- Ambassadors of Harmony
- Barbershop Harmony Society
- List of quartet champions by year

Preceded by Realtime	SPEBSQSA International Quartet Champions; 2006	Succeeded by Max Q
