= The Newfangled Four =

American barbershop quartet

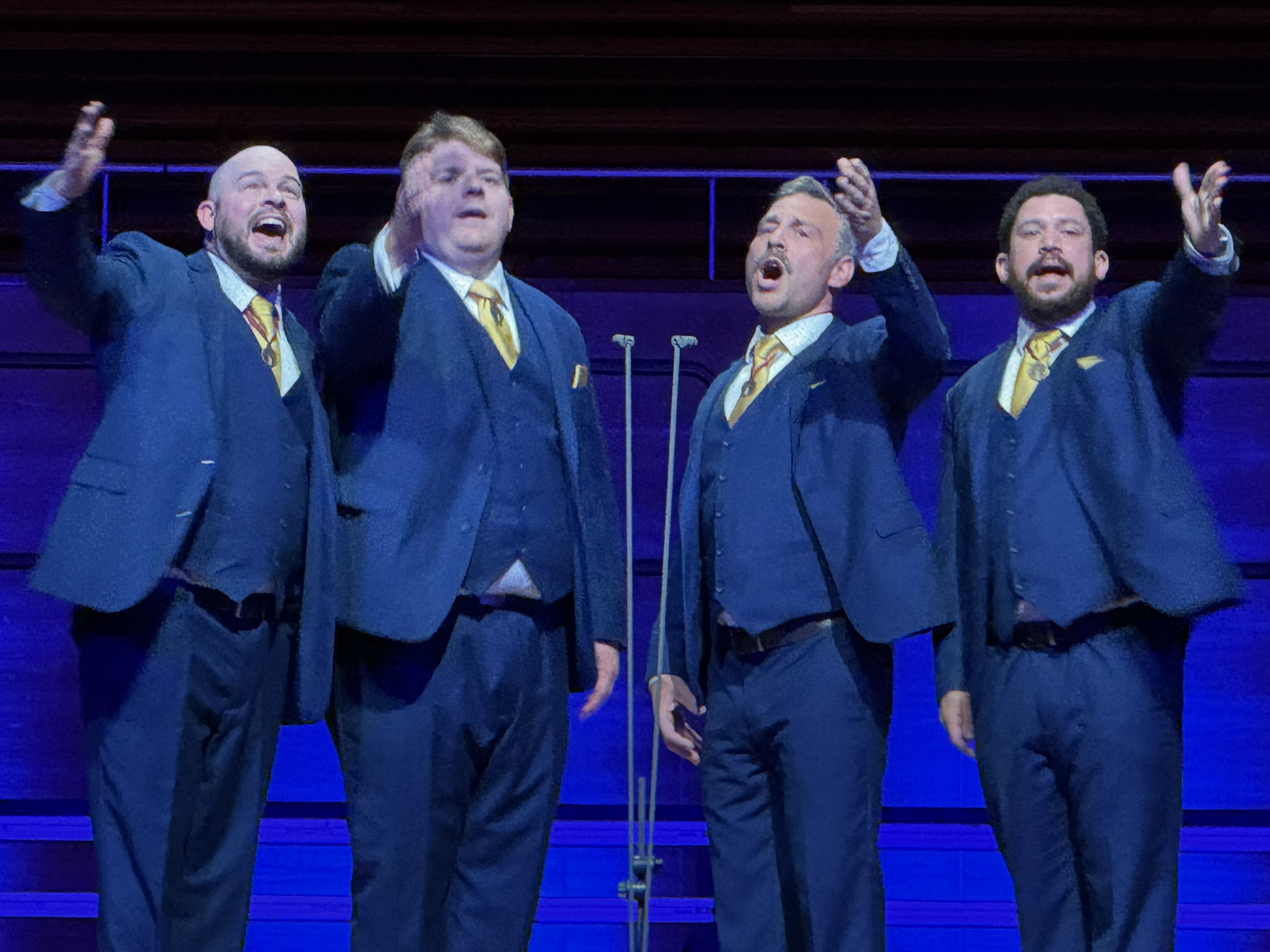
- From left to right: Buss, Niebrugge, Tickner, and Carline performing in Stockholm, Sweden in March 2026

Background information
- Origin: Westminster, California
- Genres: Barbershop, a cappella
- Years active: 2012–present
- Members: Joey Buss (tenor); Jackson Niebrugge (lead); Marcus Carline (baritone); Jake Tickner (bass)
- Past members: Ryan Wisniewski (baritone)
- Website: Official website
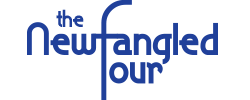

The Newfangled Four is an American barbershop a cappella quartet, specializing in comedy while also maintaining a high level in singing. They are based in Southern California. Formed in 2012, the quartet won the Barbershop Harmony Society's collegiate championship (the Harmony Foundation Collegiate Barbershop Quartet Contest) in 2013. In the 2020s, the group placed in the finals of the Barbershop Harmony Society's International Quartet Contest, including sixth place in 2023 and fifth place in 2024.

== History ==
The quartet formed in the fall of 2012 and has been associated (through its members' participation) with the Westminster Chorus and Masters of Harmony, two large ensembles in the Barbershop Harmony Society community which are also based in Southern California.

In July 2013, the quartet, made up of Joey Buss, Jackson Niebrugge, Ryan Wisniewski, and Jake Tickner, won the Barbershop Harmony Society's collegiate quartet championship at its international convention in Toronto, Ontario. Later in 2013, the quartet won the Far Western District Quartet Contest (district finals) at the fall convention in Bakersfield, California.

By the mid-2020s, the group's original baritone Ryan Wisniewski had left the group, replaced by current member Marcus Carline.

== Members ==
The quartet's current and past members included:

=== Current members ===
- Joey Buss: tenor
- Jackson Niebrugge: lead
- Marcus Carline: baritone
- Jake Tickner: bass

=== Former members ===
- Ryan Wisniewski: baritone

== Competitions and awards ==
The group has competed in collegiate, district, and international contests supported by the barbershop contest system.

Year	Contest	Result
2026	Barbershop Harmony Society International Quartet Contest (finals, St. Louis)	6th place
2025	Barbershop Harmony Society International Quartet Contest (finals, Denver)	8th place
2024	Barbershop Harmony Society International Quartet Contest (finals, Cleveland)	5th place
2023	Barbershop Harmony Society International Quartet Contest (finals, Louisville)	6th place
2013	Harmony Foundation Collegiate Barbershop Quartet Contest (international collegiate finals, Toronto)	1st place
2013	Far Western District Quartet Contest (district finals, Bakersfield)	District quartet champion

In 2020, The Newfangled Four were awarded "Quartet of the Year" by the Barbershop Harmony Society.

== Style and repertoire ==
Unlike most barbershop quartets, the Newfangled Four emphasize comedic stagecraft, including slapstick humor and offbeat comedy. However, their skills in classical barbershop harmony are also world-class, annually scoring among the top ten quartets worldwide for singing alone, apart from their typical high marks for comedy.

The Barbershop Harmony Society has published arrangements written for, or associated with, the quartet. For example, the society stated that Theo Hicks's arrangement of the standard A Cottage for Sale was originally arranged for The Newfangled Four before being offered through the BHS music catalog.

== Media and appearances ==
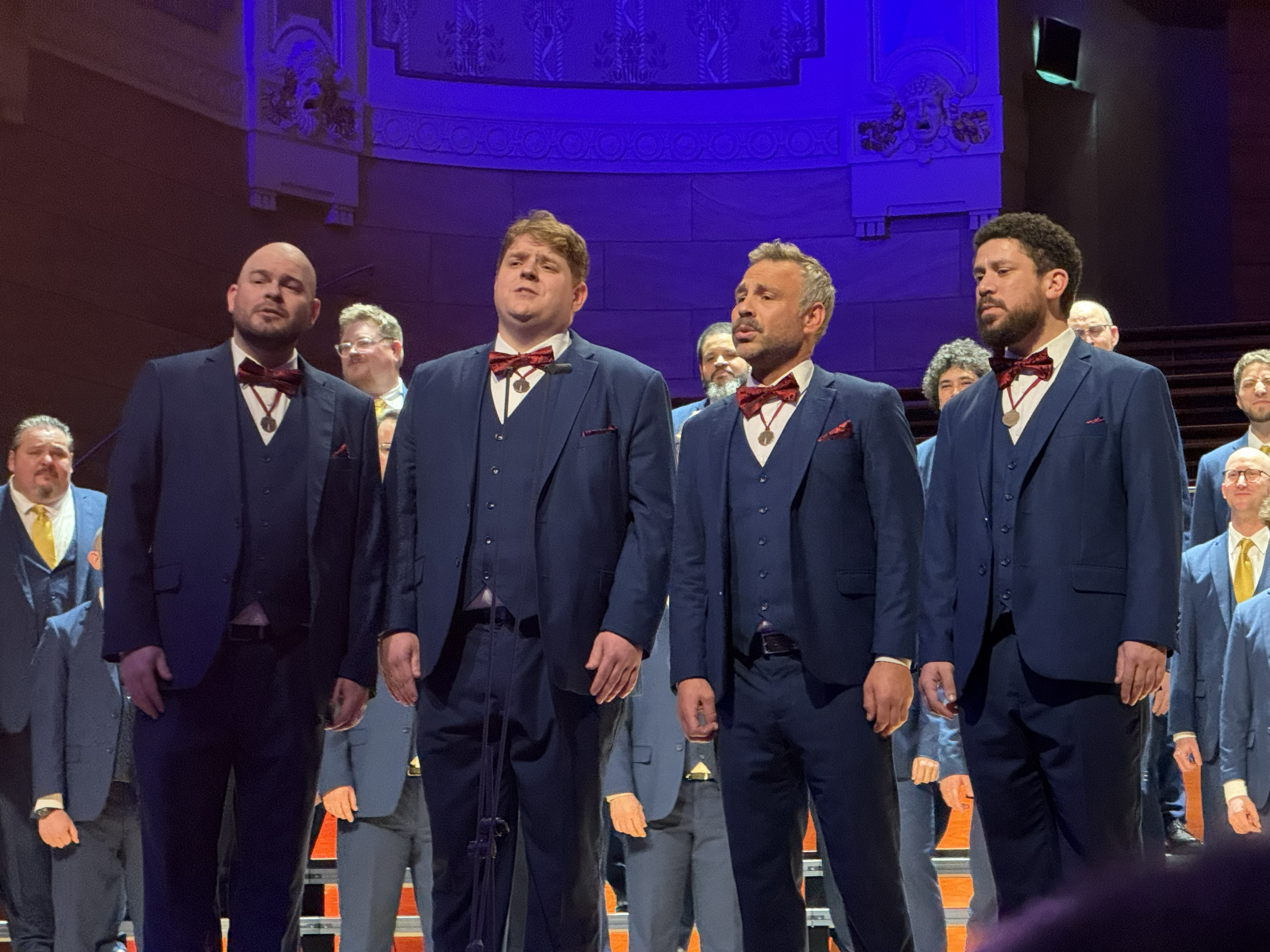
The Newfangled Four performing at BinG (Barbershop in Germany) 2026

In 2017, The Newfangled Four appeared on the Hallmark Channel program Home & Family, as reported by the Barbershop Harmony Society. That same year, the Barbershop Harmony Society also highlighted a BuzzFeed segment in which quartet members coached BuzzFeed staffers through forming a barbershop quartet.

=== Performances ===
The quartet has performed at various events, including:

- March 12, 2026: Barbershop Music Festival 2026, Barbershop in Germany. Wuppertal, Germany
- March 11, 2026: Voices of Champions, Holland Harmony Barbershop Singing. The Hague, Netherlands
- March 9, 2026: Concert with Herrenbesuch. Munich, Germany
- February 28, 2026: Elkader Keystone Chorus, Elkader, Iowa
- February 13–14, 2026: Los Angeles A Capella Festival, The Contemporary, A Capella Society. Los Angeles, California
- January 16, 2026: Barbershop Harmony Society Midwinter Convention. Pasadena, California

== Discography ==
The quartet's releases have included studio albums and an EP.

- The Newfangled Four (2017)
- A Holiday EP (2023)
- We Stole It From The Internet (2024)
