= Clay Hine =

American musician

- Born: 1963 (age 61–62)
- Genres: Barbershop, a cappella
- Occupation(s): Singer, arranger
- Instrument: Voice
- Member of: FRED, Brouhaha

Clay Hine (born 1963) is a barbershop musician and arranger.

== Early life ==
He is a native Chicagoan, but has lived in the Atlanta Metro area since the late 1980s after he graduated from the University of Illinois (Urbana-Champaign) in 1986 with a degree in electrical engineering. Before college he sang with The West Towns Chorus (Lombard, Illinois) winning 2 silver medals (1985, 1986). He started arranging when he was a teenager for fun, mostly tags and parts of songs. After college he began arranging for a newly chartered chorus in Marietta, Georgia (The Big Chicken Chorus) and his first post-college quartet Atlanta Forum (1987 Dixie District Champions). His early arrangements were to help Atlanta-area and Dixie District quartets and choruses, and he soon had requests nationwide from internationally competing choruses and quartets. Hine has arranged music for: Keepsake, PLATINUM, FRED, Four Voices, Riptide, Backbeat, Marquis, Nightlife, BSQ, Max Q, Bank Street, State Line Grocery, Overture, Sound Standard, Svelte Brothers, and other groups.

== Career ==
Although Hine learned piano for many years as a child, he is a self-taught arranger, having little formal music education at the university level. He directed the Big Chicken Chorus from 1989 through 2004 and began directing the newly chartered Atlanta Metro (Atlanta Vocal Project) chapter in 2005. In his 20 years of directing Hine has won 16 international chorus preliminary contests with the Big Chicken Chorus (1989–2004) and 6 with The Atlanta Vocal Project (2005–2008, 2011–2012). He has arranged over 300 songs in various styles with most in the barbershop style. He also served as a Music judge for the Barbershop Harmony Society for eight years.

In 1999, Hine's quartet, FRED, won the international quartet competition in Anaheim, California. He continues to be active with FRED, the Atlanta Vocal Project, and his current quartet Brouhaha. His former quartets are Category 4, and before that, A Mighty Wind, which was featured on the video game BioShock Infinite, performing a barbershop version of "God Only Knows". Hine still arranges music for various groups. In 2024, Hine was inducted into the Barbershop Harmony Society Hall of Fame.

Hine is married to Becki Hine. They have two children, Melody and Camden.
