= Vocal Majority =

American men's chorus based in Dallas, Texas

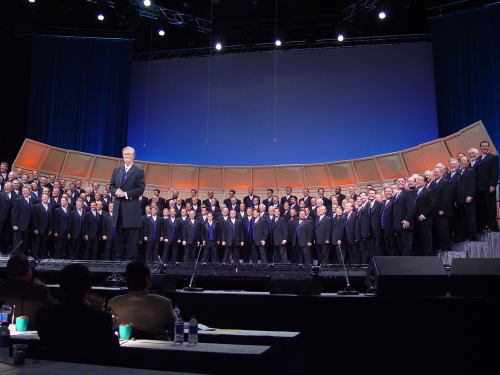
- The Vocal Majority, at Montreal's Bell Centre

Background information
- Origin: Dallas, Texas
- Genre: Barbershop music
- Years active: 1970s–present
- Website: Official site

Vocal Majority (VM) is a Dallas, Texas-based men's chorus of over 150 singers, who bill themselves with the tagline "Pure Harmony." The VM got its start when founder and first marketing director, Bob Arnold, gathered together 12 singers in December 1971; it has since grown to over 150 members. VM is the performing chorus of the Dallas Metro chapter of the Barbershop Harmony Society (BHS). Vocal Majority has won fourteen International Chorus Championships, a Barbershop Harmony Society record. The first eleven gold medals (1975, 1979, 1982, 1985, 1988, 1991, 1994, 1997, 2000, 2003, 2006) were earned under the direction of Jim Clancy, who retired from International competition after 2010. The most recent championships, in 2014, 2018 and 2025, came under the direction of Jim's son Greg Clancy, the current musical director of VM. Jim Clancy died on April 16, 2025, after a year-long battle with cancer.

Vocal Majority has released over twenty recordings and has traveled extensively domestically and internationally. Most recently, in May 2015, VM was the featured guest performers at The British Association of Barbershop Singers (BABS) Convention in Llandudno, Wales.

Several members of Vocal Majority have also won the International Quartet Championship with the quartets Max Q, Acoustix, Side Street Ramblers, Dealer's Choice, Rural Route 4, Rapscallions and Old School. In July 2017, VM vocal coach and member Tony DeRosa, who performed with the group in their 2014 International championship performance, won his fourth Quartet Championship, this time with Main Street quartet.

Vocal Majority, Jim Clancy, and Greg Clancy have all been inducted into the BHS Southwestern District's Hall of Fame.

== Competition ==
Barbershop Harmony Society contest rules do not permit any chorus to compete again for two years after winning an International Chorus Championship, so no chorus can win twice less than three years apart. As seen in the list of championship years, Vocal Majority had one four-year span between wins, from 1975 to 1979, coming in second place to the Thoroughbreds in 1978. After that, they proceeded to win the gold at every International competition in which they competed for over 30 years, until 2009, when the Ambassadors of Harmony won the gold medal. In July 2010, Vocal Majority again earned a silver medal at the International Chorus Championship in Philadelphia. Clancy announced prior to the 2010 competition that it would be his last as director. Jim Clancy continued as the executive director and principal arranger for the chorus until his death in April 2025.

Vocal Majority did not compete again at the International level until the 2014 competition, held at the MGM Grand Garden Arena in Las Vegas, Nevada. Because of past alternate-year competitions, the 2014 competition also marked the first time that Vocal Majority competed directly against eight-time champion chorus the Masters of Harmony of Santa Fe Springs, California. VM earned a composite 96.8% score from the 15-member panel of judges and took home their first gold medal since 2006, their twelfth overall.

Vocal Majority's most recent competition was in July 2018 at the Orange County Convention Center in Orlando. VM scored 2912 out of a possible 3000 points, a 97.1% score, and topped the Westminster Chorus by 42 points. This was VM's thirteenth gold medal overall.

In July 2019, Vocal Majority performed at the BHS Convention in Salt Lake City as outgoing champions. Following the convention, VM performed once again with the Tabernacle Choir at Temple Square (formerly the Mormon Tabernacle Choir) on their live worldwide television broadcast, Music & the Spoken Word.

== Director ==
In his tenure as director of the chorus, Jim Clancy built an international reputation as composer, arranger, clinician, and vocalist. Clancy conducted the chorus in performances throughout the United States, Canada, Scotland, England, before two United States Presidents, at national athletic events, with major symphony orchestras, and before hundreds of national conventions. Jim Clancy was often called upon to coach national and international choral groups, having conducted multiple concerts for the American Choral Directors Association and Music Educators National Conference. He studied under American greats Fred Waring, Madeleine Marshall, Paris Rutherford, Martha Moore Clancy, Warren Angell, and B. B. McKinney, in addition to his academic work at Baylor University, Centenary College, Louisiana, and the University of North Texas.

Clancy's discography with the chorus includes 22 albums of popular, jazz, barbershop, and inspirational music. Also under his direction VM produced the DVD, A Vocal Majority Christmas, released in 2003. As guest conductor with the Mormon Tabernacle Choir, Clancy combined the Utah ensemble with VM in a joint album, Voices In Harmony, for CBS Masterworks. He also performed on stage with many artists including Jimmy Dean, Bob Flanigan, The Four Freshmen, John Gary, Lee Greenwood, The Lettermen, Johnny Mann, The Oak Ridge Boys, and The Suntones.

In October 2000, Clancy was honored by the Barbershop Harmony Society Southwestern District when a new trophy was unveiled and named in his honor as the Jim Clancy Chorus Champion Award.

Clancy served as the principal arranger and executive producer of the chorus' latest audio recordings, Freedom's Song, Love Songs By Request, VM X and The Vocal Majority With Strings – Volume II.

In November 2013, Greg Clancy, Jim Clancy's son, was named musical director of Vocal Majority. Greg joined Vocal Majority at the age of twelve, and literally grew up studying under the direction of his father.

Greg's accomplishments in the a cappella world are numerous. Greg currently holds the Barbershop Harmony Society's record for total number of gold medals won – 13 chorus gold medals (with VM) and one quartet gold (with Max Q). Greg sang tenor with Class of the 80's, Gatsby and Dealer's Choice and currently sings in Max Q, the 2007 BHS International Quartet Champion. Greg has coached several award-winning barbershop choruses, including Ambassadors of Harmony, Masters of Harmony, Toronto Northern Lights and Chicago's Northbrook Chorus.

Greg's vocation also revolves around music. He has been a first-call studio vocalist in North Texas' thriving jingle industry for over 25 years. He recently was promoted to GM/VP Creative at TM Studios, the world's preeminent radio music production house. At TM, a division of WestwoodOne, Greg composes imaging music for stations around the country, including KABC in Los Angeles, WMAL in Washington, D.C. and WLS in Chicago. Locally, Greg's music is heard branding stations KVIL, KRLD, KLUV and others. He has also composed many local retail jingle campaigns for area businesses. Greg also sings in and produces most of the vocal sessions taking place at TM and has produced/co-produced many of the Vocal Majority's audio recordings including The Music Never Ends, How Sweet The Sound, You Raise Me Up, Believe, and The Jim Clancy Collection.

== Discography and written resources ==
- Standing Room Only (1976)
- Champs Back To Back (1976)
- With A Song In Our Hearts (1979)
- Here's to The Winners (1980)
- From Texas With Love (VM Productions; Cassette; 1981)
- Decade of Gold (1983)
- All the Best (1983)
- The Secret of Christmas (VM Productions; CD, Cassette; 1985)
- For God, Country, & You (VM Productions; CD, Cassette; 1988)
- I'll Be Seeing You (VM Productions; CD, Cassette; 1990)
- Alleluia (VM Productions; CD, Cassette; 1992)
- Best of the Early Years (VM Productions; CD, Cassette; (1992)
- The Music Never Ends (VM Productions; CD, Cassette; 1996)
- How Sweet the Sound (VM Productions; CD, Cassette; 1997)
- The Vocal Majority with Strings, Volume I (VM Productions; CD, Cassette; 1998)
- White Christmas (VM Productions; CD, Cassette; 2001)
- Freedom's Song (VM Productions; CD, Cassette; 2002)
- Love Songs By Request (VM Productions; CD, Cassette; 2002)
- VM X (VM Productions; CD 2003)
- Vocal Majority with Strings, Volume II (VM Productions; CD; 2004)
- You Raise Me Up (VM Productions; CD; 2005)
- Believe (VM Productions; CD; 2007)
- Something's Coming: Broadway Hits from America's Premier Pops Chorus (VM Productions; CD; 2009)
- VM Bandstand (VM Productions; CD;2011)
- The Spirit of Christmas (VM Productions; CD; 2013)
- Then Sings My Soul (VM Productions; CD; 2015)
- Comfort & Joy: 2-Disc Set (VM Productions; CD; 2017)
- A Million Dreams (VM Productions; CD;2018)
- What the World Needs Now is Love (VM Music Company; CD;2022)
- We Wish You a Merry Christmas (VM Music Company; CD;2023)
- Written history: Arnold, Bob (December 8, 2017). The Gold Medal Standard: Exploring The Power of Music and the Legacy of The Vocal Majority Chorus. ASIN B07864L3R1.

== Awards and recognition ==
| Preceded by Westminster Chorus | Barbershop Harmony Society International Chorus Champions; 2025 | Succeeded by Ambassadors of Harmony |
| Preceded by Masters of Harmony | Barbershop Harmony Society International Chorus Champions; 2018 | Succeeded by Westminster Chorus |
| Preceded by Toronto Northern Lights | Barbershop Harmony Society International Chorus Champions; 2014 | Succeeded by Westminster Chorus |
| Preceded by Masters of Harmony | Barbershop Harmony Society International Chorus Champions; 2006 | Succeeded by Westminster Chorus |
| Preceded by Masters of Harmony | SPEBSQSA International Chorus Champions; 2003 | Succeeded by Ambassadors of Harmony |
| Preceded by Masters of Harmony | SPEBSQSA International Chorus Champions; 2000 | Succeeded by New Tradition Chorus |
| Preceded by Masters of Harmony | SPEBSQSA International Chorus Champions; 1997 | Succeeded by Alexandria Harmonizers |
| Preceded by Masters of Harmony | SPEBSQSA International Chorus Champions; 1994 | Succeeded by Alexandria Harmonizers |
| Preceded by Masters of Harmony | SPEBSQSA International Chorus Champions; 1991 | Succeeded by Southern Gateway Chorus |
| Preceded by West Towns Chorus | SPEBSQSA International Chorus Champions; 1988 | Succeeded by Alexandria Harmonizers |
| Preceded by Thoroughbreds | SPEBSQSA International Chorus Champions; 1985 | Succeeded by Alexandria Harmonizers |
| Preceded by Thoroughbreds | SPEBSQSA International Chorus Champions; 1982 | Succeeded by Phoenicians |
| Preceded by Thoroughbreds | SPEBSQSA International Chorus Champions; 1979 | Succeeded by Dukes of Harmony |
| Preceded by Thoroughbreds | SPEBSQSA International Chorus Champions; 1975 | Succeeded by Phoenicians |
