= New Tradition Chorus =

American barbershop chorus

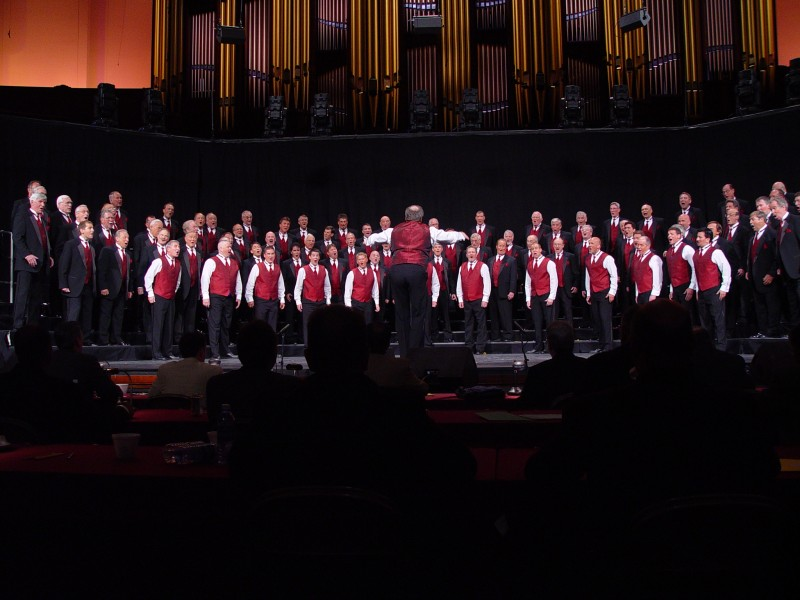
- The New Tradition Chorus
- Website: Official site

The New Tradition Chorus is a mixed voice barbershop chorus based in Northbrook, Illinois, in the Chicago area. Founded in 1982, they have competed at the International Chorus Contest of the Barbershop Harmony Society 19 times, winning a medal on every attempt until the 2009 competition, where they finished 15th. They have won ten bronze medals, a record eight consecutive silver medals (1993–2000), and the gold medal in 2001. The chorus had all male members until 2022.

== Director ==
Mitch Greenberg became the chorus director in August 2021, with ten years of directing experience. Greenberg is a quartet singer and has placed in the top 20 in international competition.

| Preceded by Vocal Majority | SPEBSQSA International Chorus Champions; 2001 | Succeeded by Masters of Harmony |
