= Gotcha! (quartet) =

Barbershop quartet

- Origin: California
- Genres: Barbershop
- Members: Garry Texeira – tenor Chris Vaughn – lead Alan Gordon – baritone Jim Kline – bass (since 2001)
- Past members: Scott Wilson – bass (to 2001)
- Website: Official site

Gotcha! is an American barbershop quartet formed in 1996 by four members of the Masters of Harmony chorus.

Gotcha! became the international champions of the Barbershop Harmony Society in 2004 after six previous attempts at the title.

Baritone Alan Gordon became a member of SPEBSQSA (now BHS) when he was 10 years old. He has achieved much in the barbershop world, including becoming a singing judge. In addition to having been assistant director of the Masters of Harmony Chorus and their baritone section leader, he directed the Verdugo Hills Chorus at their Sweet Adelines International competition. He is a Master Director in SAI.

Bass Jim Kline had previously achieved many non-gold medals with SPEBSQSA, most of them with the 139th Street Quartet, which was frequently featured on television—including appearances on "Night Court" and "Cheers".

Lead Chris Vaughn is a lead section leader for the Denver Mile High Chorus.

Tenor Garry Texiera would later direct the Indianapolis-based Circle City Sound Chorus.

The original bass of the quartet was Scott Wilson.

== Discography ==
- Right Now! (CD/cassette; 1999)
- Gotcha! Again! (CD; 2003)
- Gotcha! At Last (CD; 2006)

| Preceded by Power Play | SPEBSQSA International Quartet Champions; 2004 | Succeeded by Realtime |
