= Amersham A Cappella =

Choir

Amersham A Cappella is a dynamic, ladies' barbershop chorus affiliated with LABBS (The Ladies' Association of British Barbershop Singers). The chorus is based in Amersham, Buckinghamshire.

As a competing barbershop chorus, Amersham A Cappella have won multiple awards and accolades – these include:

- July 2025 represented LABBS at the Barbershop Harmony Society (BHS) International Contest in Denver, USA
- 1st place at the 2024 LABBS Chorus Contest
- 1st place at the 2023 Irish Association of Barbershop Singers (IABS) International Chorus Contest
- 2nd place at the 2022 LABBS Chorus Contest
- 1st place at the 2019 LABBS Chorus Contest
- 1st place at the 2019 Mixed Chorus Competition with Cottontown Chorus as "A Kind of Magic"
- August 2018 - staged a show "A Pitch in Time" at Edinburgh Fringe Festival
- 1st place at the 2018 Spanish (SABS) International Chorus Contest
- 2nd place at the 2017 European Chorus Contest, Bournemouth, UK
- 1st place at the 2016 LABBS Chorus Contest and
- 2nd place at the 2015 LABBS Chorus Contest and
- 2nd place at the 2014 LABBS Chorus Contest and
- 2nd place at the 2013 LABBS Chorus Contest and
- 5th place at the 2013 European Barbershop Convention, in Veldhoven, The Netherlands,
- 2nd place at the 2012 LABBS Chorus Contest and
- 1st place at the 2012 Majestic Choir of the Year competition.

The chorus has just over 70 members, from all walks of life, who mostly live in or around Buckinghamshire and Hertfordshire (with some travelling from further afield to be part of the chorus). As a registered charity itself, the chorus invests considerable time and effort working to support their local community, in particular by supporting charitable endeavours wherever possible.

Their album "Wow! It's Amersham A Cappella", released in 2016 came 2nd place in the International 2016 Contemporary A Cappella Awards for Best Barbershop Album of the Year.

== History ==
The chorus was formed in January 1982 by Ian Stone – a member of the local men's barbershop group, initially as the "wives and girlfriends" of that chorus. The group was called Chiltern Harmony, and under Ian Stone's direction, became members of LABBS (The Ladies' Association of British Barbershop Singers) later that year. Over the next few years the chorus grew in number and won a number of accolades as chorus directorship was passed from Ian Stone to Wendy Searle to Gay McBride, and is currently directed by Helen Lappert.

In 2007, to match the young, dynamic vibe of the chorus, the group changed its name to Amersham A Cappella, the name by which the chorus is known today.

== Accolades and appearances ==
The accolades won by the chorus are numerous: five national gold medals at LABBS (2024, 2019, 2016, 2010 and 1995), two international gold medals, 1 silver European medal, five LABBS national silver medals and two LABBS national bronze, and a number of independently adjudicated choral competitions, to include the 2010 Good Housekeeping Choir of The Year.

As well as many private bookings, the chorus have put on numerous shows and concerts including a sell out show at the Wycombe Swan in 2016. They also performed at the Edinburgh Fringe festival in 2018. More recently, they staged a joint show with the Cottontown Chorus in 2024.

They have recently appeared on ITV London News after being overheard singing in the pub after rehearsal by the show's producer.https://www.amershamacappella.com/dbpage.phppg=news

During lockdown Amersham A Cappella and Cottontown put together a music video with rehearsals via Zoom, of You're still the one.

The chorus performed their version of Swing Low, Sweet Chariot on the pitch in May 2012 at Twickenham Stadium For the England Rugby team vs. Barbarians 2012 Mid Year Test, and again for the same match in 2013.

In November 2012, Amersham A Cappella supported the Innocent Drinks Big Knit campaign by writing and recording a viral for their site.
