= Northwest Sound Men's Chorus =

- Official logo of the Northwest Sound Men's Chorus

Background information
- Origin: Bellevue, Washington United States
- Genres: Barbershop, Choral
- Years active: 1985–present (40 years ago)
- Website: northwestsound.org

The Northwest Sound Men's Chorus is a men's a cappella chorus in Bellevue, Washington, as a chapter of the Evergreen District, a part of the Barbershop Harmony Society. The chorus celebrated its 40th anniversary in 2025. Its membership draws from the Greater Puget Sound area. The chapter does a yearly community outreach, "Sing, Sing, Sing!", that offers free singing lessons for people of all ages.

== History ==
The Northwest Sound Men's Chorus was chartered by Barbershop Harmony Society in 1985. The chorus has won numerous awards since its inception:

- Evergreen District Chorus champions
  - 1986
  - 1988
  - 1990
  - 1991
  - 1992
  - 1994
  - 2005
  - 2014 (placed 1st)
- Barbershop Harmony Society International Chorus Finals contestant:
  - 1987
  - 1989 (placed 10th)
  - 1991 (placed 12th)
  - 1992 (placed 9th)
  - 1993 (placed 9th)
  - 1995 (placed 16th)
  - 2006 (placed 20th)
  - 2009 (placed 19th)
  - 2011 (placed 21st)

== Joining ==
The Northwest Sound Men's Chorus holds open auditions year round for new members in all vocal parts. The audition process includes a pre-screening and a demonstration of "tonality, listening and musicality" with one of the chorus's repertoire songs.

== See also ==
- Barbershop Harmony Society
- Barbershop music
- A cappella music
