= Ambassadors of Harmony =

U.S. barbershop chorus from Missouri

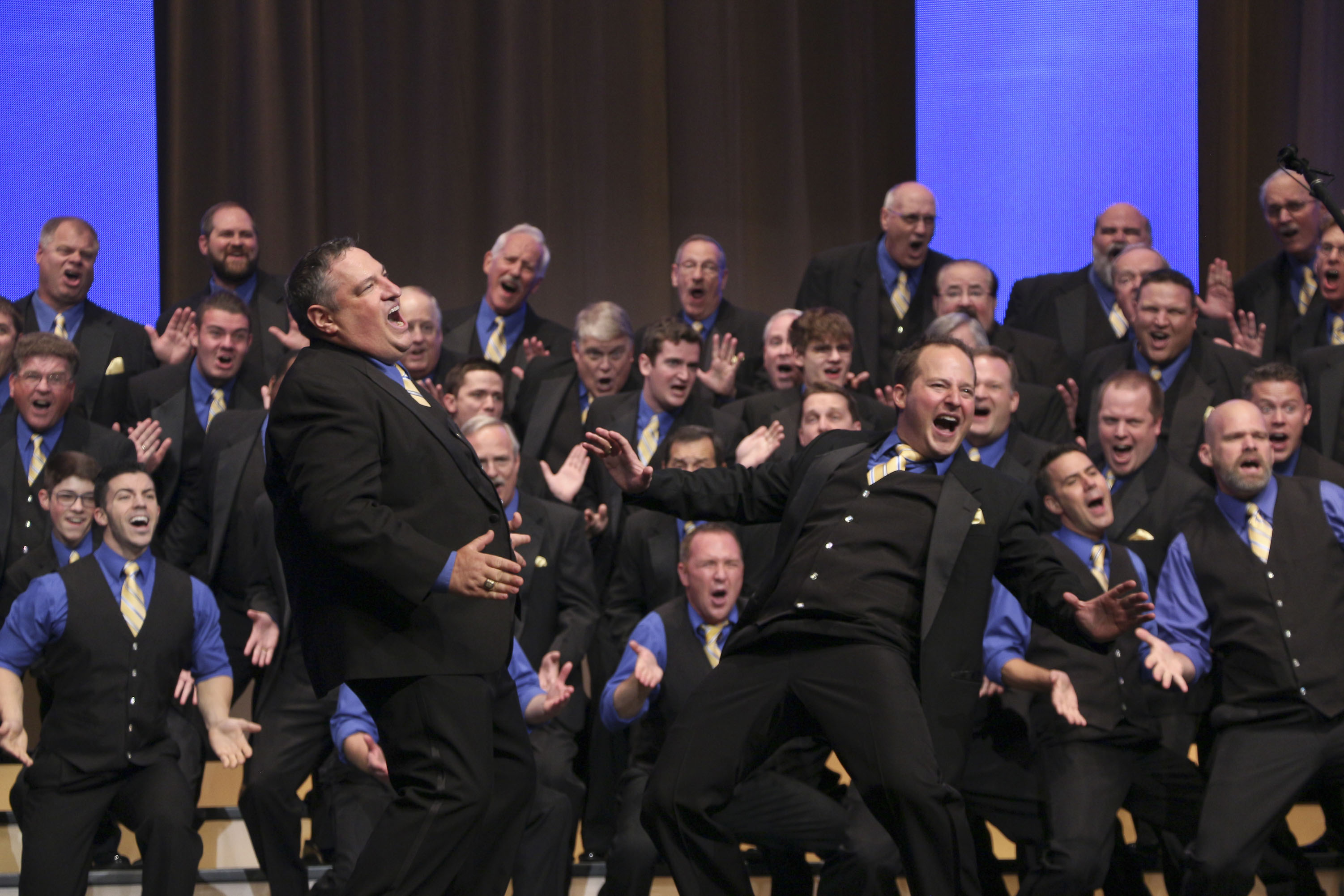
- performing their 2016 BHS gold medal-winning set

Background information
- Origin: St. Charles, Missouri, U.S.
- Genres: a cappella
- Years active: 1963–present
- Website: aoh.org

The Ambassadors of Harmony (AOH) is a 120+ member men's barbershop chorus, based in St. Charles, Missouri. The chorus won International Championship gold medals in 2004, 2009, and 2012 – each time singing two arrangements by David Wright, under the direction of Dr. Jim Henry – and then again in 2016 and 2023, under the co-direction of Jonny Moroni and Dr. Henry, and in 2026, under Moroni. Their 2009 victory broke a nearly three-decade winning streak by the Vocal Majority. (Note: Winning choruses are required to sit out of competition for two years. The Vocal Majority did not compete in 2004.)

Noted for its crisp choreography and its broad demographics, the chorus continues to expand its reputation as a premier arts organization while expanding audience engagement. Their Christmas shows are among the most popular holiday concerts in St. Louis, averaging over 7,000 patrons per year, while their youth programs continue to expand and equip young singers in substantive ways. The chorus has established a foundation to ensure that its mission to youth will continue to deepen, and as of 2017 it added an annual fundraising gala to its calendar to engage the community to join in their goals.

== History ==
The chorus was formed in 1963 as the Daniel Boone Chorus with 26 members, and became a member of SPEBSQSA (the Society for the Preservation and Encouragement of Barbershop Quartet Singing in America Inc.) the following year. The chorus changed its name to the Ambassadors of Harmony in 1990 following its first international competition. The chorus was directed by noted arranger and mathematician David Wright (now associate director) from 1981 to 1990 and again in 1999 to 2000 and has been directed from 1991 to 1999 and since 2001 by Dr. Jim Henry (now co-director), bass singer of the 1993 International Quartet Champion, The Gas House Gang, and the 2009 International Quartet Champion, Crossroads. Since 2013, the group's co-director has been Jonny Moroni, baritone of Vocal Spectrum, the BHS 2006 International Quartet Champion and 2004 International College Quartet Champion.

== Barbershop Harmony Society medalists ==
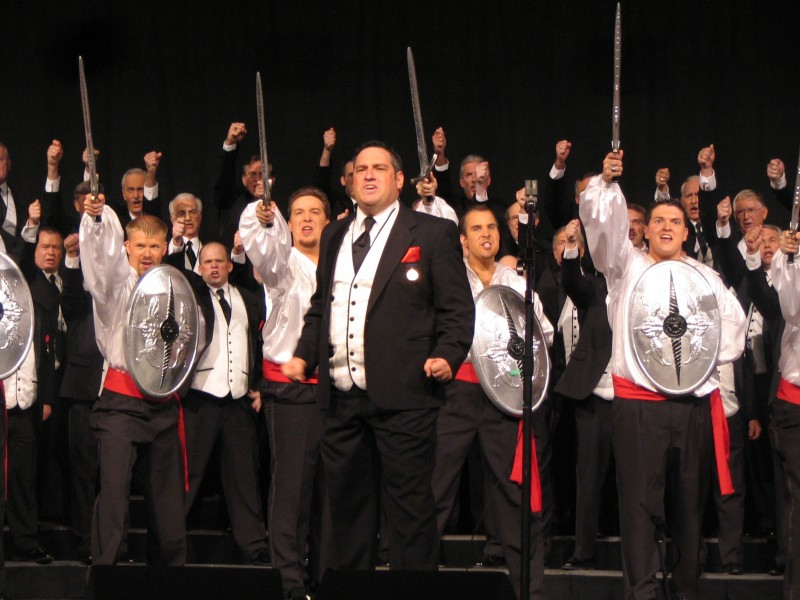
The Ambassadors of Harmony performed their championship swan song set in 2005.

Since 1994, the Ambassadors of Harmony Chorus has won top honors in every district chorus competition they have entered for the 5-state Central States District of the Barbershop Harmony Society (formerly known as SPEBSQSA, Inc). In this period the AOH acquired four 4th place, five 3rd place, and five 2nd place medals in international chorus competition, as well as the 2004, 2009, 2012, 2016, 2023, and 2026 1st place gold medals.

At the BHS international chorus contest in July 2007, the group tied for first place with the Westminster Chorus. The winner was then determined by the singing category score, earning AOH its first silver medal. The group won another silver medal in the July 2008 international contest in Nashville, Tennessee, then won their second gold medal in July 2009 in Anaheim, California. Their third gold medal was won in 2012 in Portland, Oregon. Their fourth gold medal was won in 2016 in Nashville, Tennessee, their fifth in 2023 in Louisville, Kentucky, and their sixth by a single point in 2026 in St. Louis.

== St. Louis area activity ==
=== Municipal Opera performances ===
St Louis Muny performances include:

- Oklahoma! 1993, with members of the Riverblenders Chorus (SAI)
- 50 members in the 2000 cast of White Christmas
- 25 members in the 2006 cast of White Christmas
- 25 members in the 1992, 1997, and 2003 casts of South Pacific
- Quartets supplied for The Music Man and other productions

=== Other performances ===
- Acappellooza Summer
- AcaFest!
- A Choral Celebration of St. Louis
- America Sings!
- American International Choral Festival
- Annual Christmas show
- Annual Spring show
- Boonslick Chordbusters Chorus Christmas show
- Central West End Winterfest
- Crescendo Concert series
- Festival of the Little Hills
- From the Garden, Live!
- Gala
- Greater Alton Concert Association
- Half Time Show at St. Louis Rams game
- Hurricane Katrina benefit concert
- Land of Lincoln Chorus show
- Mayors' Charity Ball
- Mosaic Arts Festival
- Missouri Music Educators Association
- National anthem at St. Louis Cardinals baseball games
- Singing Valentines
- Sing Out St. Louis
- South West American Choral Director's Association (SWACDA)
- St. Charles Christmas Traditions
- St. Charles Mayor's prayer breakfast
- St. Louis Mayor's prayer breakfast
- St. Peters Olde Tyme Picnic
- Then Sings My Soul

=== Youth activities ===
- Acappellooza Fall – Begun in 2002, in partnership with the University of Missouri St. Louis, the program provides an opportunity for 1,100 high school students to take a day trip to work with director Dr. Jim Henry, be mentored by and hear a set by AOH.
- College Scholarship – ongoing since at least 1997, provides a scholarship for a male high-schooler from St. Charles County, and since 2016 expanded to include St. Louis and St. Louis County
- Recruits Chorus – Formed in 2012, it is a mixed chorus for youth aged 9–25. The Recruits are co-directed by Keegan Eich and Eric Dalbey; they have competed in the BHS MidWinter contest.
- Acappellooza Summer – Since 2013, a four-day camp on the campus of UMSL, led by Dr. Jim Henry and Debbie Cleveland, teaching barbershop and a cappella singing
- Project Harmony St. Louis – Ambassadors encourage and mentor students at local high schools in barbershop quartetting
- AcaFest – The newest outreach, since 2016, an October gathering of local high school and college a cappella groups to form stronger relationships with the youth a cappella community. The first event took place on the campus of Missouri Baptist University.

== International performances ==
Several international affiliate organizations of the Barbershop Harmony Society have invited AOH to perform at their gatherings.

- Spring 1999 Ireland
- March 2004 Germany (BinG! Convention), Netherlands, and Sweden (with The EntertainMen)
- May 2006 England BABS Convention
- March 2016 Germany (BinG! Convention)

== Discography ==
- All Our Best 1994 [sold out]
- Sing, Sing, Sing! 2000
- Applause! 2002
- Holidays in Gold December 2004
- Oh What a Day! June 2010
- Welcome Christmas! December 2011
- Somewhere 2013
- On Top Of The World 2016

== Selection of songs list ==
Some of AOH's more popular songs, and their years in repertoire, are:

- "No Other Love" 2012
- "Step in Time" 2012
- "They All Laughed" 2011
- "America" 2010
- "If You Love Me (Really Love Me)" 2009
- "Seventy-Six Trombones" 2009 – As of 2023, AOH's performance of this song at the 2009 BHS International Chorus Contest still holds the record for highest score in the 'Performance' category for an individual song (99.6%)
- "Get Me to the Church on Time" 2008
- "Love Walked In" 2008
- "They Didn't Believe Me" 2007, 2011
- "Fit as a Fiddle (And Ready for Love)" 2007
- "Friend Like Me" 2006 to 2008
- "Man of La Mancha" 2005 to 2008
- "New Ashmolean Marching Society and Students' Conservatory Band" 2004 to 2006
- "I Have Dreamed" 2004 to 2006, 2010
- "Just a Kid Named Joe" 2003
- "Shine (Roll Them Bones)" 2003
- "Toyland" 2001 to 2002
- "Toy Song" 2001 to 2002

== Awards and recognition ==
- St Charles County Arty Award – Arts Council, 1996
- Most Creative Choral Ensemble (Reader's Pick) – St. Louis Post-Dispatch, 2015
- Excellence in the arts honoree – St. Louis Arts and Education Council, 2020

== External links and sources ==
- Official website
- Barbershop Harmony Society International Score Sheets
- AOH newsletters ("Break Time")

Preceded by Vocal Majority	SPEBSQSA International Chorus Champions; 2026	Succeeded by N/A
Preceded by Music City Chorus	SPEBSQSA International Chorus Champions; 2023	Succeeded by Westminster Chorus
Preceded by Westminster Chorus	SPEBSQSA International Chorus Champions; 2016	Succeeded by Masters of Harmony
Preceded by Masters of Harmony	SPEBSQSA International Chorus Champions; 2012	Succeeded by Toronto Northern Lights
Preceded by Masters of Harmony	SPEBSQSA International Chorus Champions; 2009	Succeeded by Westminster Chorus
Preceded by Vocal Majority	SPEBSQSA International Chorus Champions; 2004	Succeeded by Masters of Harmony
