= Harmony, Incorporated =

Women's barbershop singing organization

- Official Harmony, Incorporated logo

Background information
- Origin: Providence, Rhode Island
- Genres: A cappella barbershop music
- Years active: 1959–present
- Members: 1,992 (October 2015)
- Website: www.harmonyinc.org

Harmony, Incorporated is an international organization of women singers that focuses on education, friendship, and barbershop singing. Founded in 1959 by Peggy Rigby, Charlotte Sneddon, Mary Avis Hedges, Jeanne Maino, and Mary Perry in Providence, Rhode Island, the organization currently has just under 2,000 members in the United States and Canada and is closely affiliated with the Barbershop Harmony Society.

== History ==
In 1957, several members of Sweet Adelines International (SAI) broke from the organization in protest of a policy limiting membership to Caucasian women. In 1958, chapters from Rhode Island, Massachusetts, and Orillia, Ontario, also left SAI to form Harmony, Incorporated.

Harmony, Inc. was incorporated in the State of Rhode Island on February 26, 1959. The founding member chapters of Harmony, Inc. were the Melody Belles of Providence, Rhode Island; Sea Gals of New Bedford, Massachusetts; The Harmonettes of North Attleboro, Massachusetts; Harmony Belles of Barrie-Orillia, Ontario; and the Harborettes of Scituate, Massachusetts.

In 1963, a Sweet Adelines chapter in Ottawa, Ontario, was threatened with expulsion after accepting a Black woman, Lana Clowes, as a member. As a result, Ottawa's Capital Chordettes left SAI to become the seventh chapter to join Harmony, Incorporated.

In 2013, Harmony, Inc. announced the creation of the Affiliate membership category, extending membership to men involved with the organization.

== Contests ==
Harmony, Inc. annually holds international and area-level conventions and contests for choruses and quartets. These events provide opportunities for education, evaluation, and fellowship.

Quartets who win the international gold medal are called "Harmony Queens," and are considered champions indefinitely; they may not compete again. A chorus that wins the gold must sit out of competition for one year and may compete again in the second year following their championship.

=== Recent Quartet champions ===
- Take4, 2022 International Quartet Champions
- Hot Pursuit, 2019 International Quartet Champions
- Aged to Perfection, 2018 International Quartet Champions
- Charisma, 2017 International Quartet Champions
- Taken 4 Granite, 2016 International Quartet Champions
- LiveWire, 2015 International Quartet Champions
- Moonstruck, 2014 International Quartet Champions
- Spot On, 2013 International Quartet Champions

=== Recent Chorus champions ===
- Northern Blend Chorus, three-time International Chorus Champions (2010, 2017, 2022). Their 2017 win ended The Village Vocal Chords' streak of 19 consecutive championships.
- New England Voices in Harmony, from Nashua, New Hampshire, two-time International Chorus Champions (2014, 2018)
- A Cappella Showcase from Milton, Ontario, four-time International Chorus Champions (2008, 2012, 2016, 2019)
- The Village Vocal Chords, based in Metro Chicago, Illinois, 20-time International Chorus Champions, including 19 consecutive wins from 1979 to 2015
- Derby City Chorus from Louisville, Kentucky, five-time International Chorus Champions (1998–2006)

== Areas ==
Harmony, Inc. is divided into geographical areas, and the membership of an Area consists of all the chapters and Associate members assigned to it by the International Board of Directors (IBOD).

For purposes of administration (particularly of contests and events), the society is organized into geographical areas as follows:

- Area 1: Ten chapters, located in Quebec, New Brunswick, Nova Scotia, Newfoundland, Labrador, and Prince Edward Island
- Area 2: Twelve chapters located in Connecticut, Maine, Massachusetts, New Hampshire, Rhode Island, Vermont, and the Province of Quebec south of latitude 46'N
- Area 3: Ten chapters located in Delaware, Maryland, New Jersey, New York, Pennsylvania, Virginia, and West Virginia
- Area 4: Eleven chapters located in Illinois, Indiana, Iowa, Kentucky, Michigan, Missouri, Ohio, Wisconsin, and California
- Area 5: Eight chapters located in Ontario
- Area 6: Nine chapters located in Alabama, Florida, Georgia, Mississippi, North Carolina, South Carolina, Tennessee
- Expansion Area: All other provinces and states of Canada and the United States not included in Areas 1 through 6
