= Power Play (quartet) =

Barbershop quartet

- Origin: Michigan
- Genres: Barbershop
- Members: Don Slamka – tenor Michael Slamka – lead Mark Slamka – baritone Jack Slamka – bass
- Website: Official site

Power Play is a barbershop quartet based in Michigan. They were the 2003 Barbershop Harmony Society International Quartet Champion. Each member of the quartet is a member of the Slamka family. Power Play was formed in 1988, and won the Pioneer (Michigan) District quartet championship in the fall of 1989. They have competed in international competition 12 times, most recently in Montreal where they earned international gold medals. Jack Slamka is the father of Michael and Mark, and Don is his nephew.

== Discography ==
- The Best Times (1992)
- A Musical Scrapbook (1998)
- Love at Home (2003)

Preceded by Four Voices	SPEBSQSA International Quartet Champions; 2003	Succeeded by Gotcha!
