= Realtime (quartet) =

Barbershop quartet

- Genres: Barbershop
- Members: Tim Broersma – tenor John Newell – lead Mark Metzger – baritone Tom Metzger – bass

Realtime is a barbershop quartet that won the Barbershop Harmony Society's International Quartet Championship in 2005. They finished seventh-place the previous year (the first ever top-ten finish for a western-Canadian quartet). Lead singer John Newell is the first Australian-born international champion. Baritone Mark Metzger and bass Tom Metzger are the first champions who are both Canadian-born and Canadian citizens. Tenor Tim Broersma is from Lynden, Washington. In 2008, Doug Broersma became the lead singer when Newell retired for family reasons. The quartet was succeeded by Via Voice when Tim Broersma retired in 2011, also for family reasons.

As of 2015, Realtime in its original formation has returned to performing.

Realtime also won the Pacific Northwest Regional Harmony Sweepstakes A Cappella Festival twice, in 2007 with John Newell on Lead and again in 2010 with Doug Broersma singing Lead.

As of 2016, John Newell is the musical director for The Gentlemen of Fortune barbershop chorus in Vancouver, British Columbia.

== Discography ==
- Four Brothers (CD; 2004)
- Ain't That A Kick (CD; 2006)
- Take 5 (CD; 2009)

Preceded by Gotcha!	SPEBSQSA International Quartet Champions; 2005	Succeeded by Vocal Spectrum
