= The Jazz Firm =

British vocal quartet

Background information
- Formerly of: Uli Grigoleit; Sally McLean; Alison Jones; Jenny Share

The Jazz Firm was a British vocal quartet specialising in close harmony jazz and barbershop arrangements. The quartet won the Ladies Association of British Barbershop Singers (LABBS) quartet competition in 2003.

The Jazz Firm was made up of Uli Grigoleit as tenor, Sally McLean as lead, Alison Jones as baritone, and Jenny Share as bass. Their first competition was LABBS Convention 2001, where they won the silver medal. After a change in line up and a year during which they chose not to compete, they placed fourth at the European Convention in The Netherlands in March 2003. At the 2003 LABBS Convention, they won the gold medal and the three category trophies for singing, presentation and music.

During their gold medal year they acted as ambassadors for LABBS. They represented LABBS at the Buckeye Invitational Competition in Columbus, Ohio in August 2005, where they were placed third. They also placed second at an international convention hosted by LABBS in Cardiff in October 2005.

Tenor singer Uli Grigoleit died on 12 December 2008 after battling cancer for 18 months.
