= David Wright (arranger) =

American mathematician and singer (born 1949)

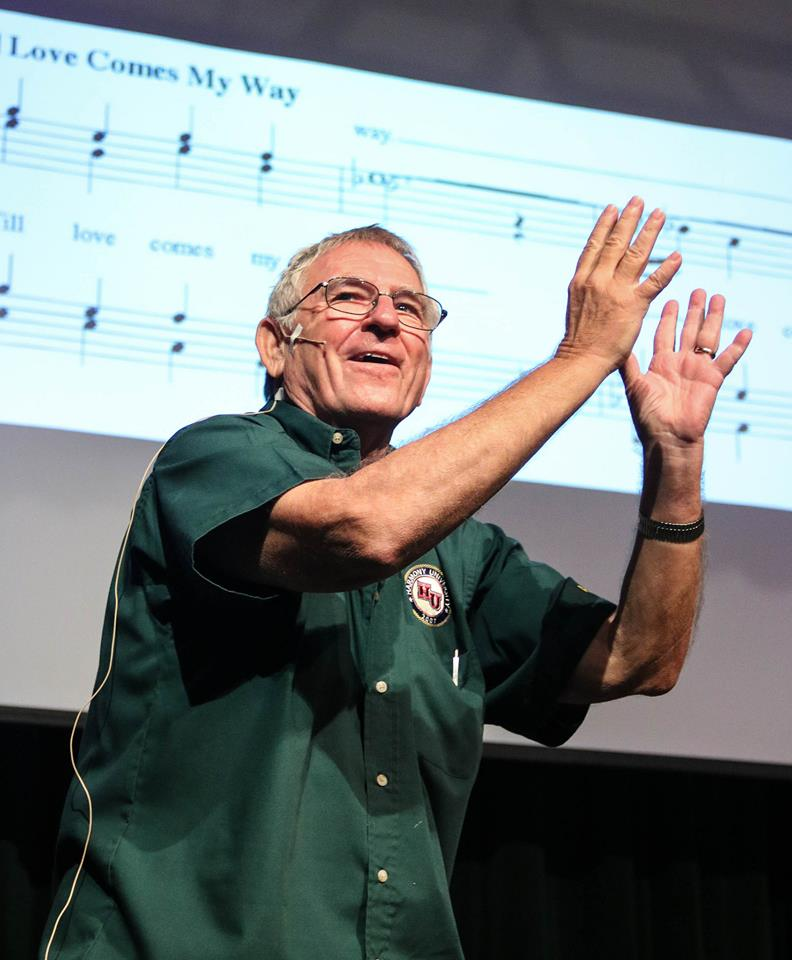
- David Wright lectures at Harmony University, 2017.

Background information
- Born: December 1, 1949 (age 76); Mattoon, Illinois
- Genres: Barbershop, a cappella
- Occupations: Arranger, coach, professor
- Instrument: Voice

David Lee Wright (born December 1, 1949) is a mathematics professor, barbershop arranger, and Associate Director of the Ambassadors of Harmony (AOH). He is a noted a cappella historian and arranger, especially in the barbershop style where in 12 of 18 years from 1999 to 2016, his arrangements resulted in chorus gold medals at the Barbershop Harmony Society (BHS) International Contest. Wright travels the world as a barbershop historian, coach, and mathematics lecturer.

== Early life ==
Wright grew up in Mattoon, Illinois, and currently lives in St. Louis, Missouri. He graduated from David Lipscomb University in Nashville then earned his Ph.D. in Mathematics at Columbia University. He joined the faculty of Washington University in St. Louis in 1972. He is married to Sandi Wright, Sweet Adelines International Quartet Champion of 1978 and 1986 with Tetrachords and Ambiance.

== Career ==
Wright is retired from his position as a professor of Mathematics in the Arts and Sciences at Washington University in St. Louis, where he also served as Chair of the Mathematics Department for several years. His research of affine algebraic geometry and polynomial automorphisms has led to publications and invitations to speak at international mathematics conferences. He designed and teaches a university course in Mathematics and Music, and has directed seminars across the globe on that topic.

== Barbershop harmony ==
Wright is an arranger and composer of vocal music, where his work often integrates the close harmony barbershop style with jazz, gospel, contemporary a cappella and more. He is the Associate Director of the Ambassadors of Harmony, an award-winning male chorus of 130 singers. Wright was inducted into the Barbershop Harmony Society Hall of Fame in 2008. He has arranged hundreds of songs in the barbershop style, including some co-arranged with Deke Sharon, and has earned four international chorus gold medals with the Ambassadors of Harmony. Arrangements include Rhapsody of New York, a vocal arrangement of orchestral composition Rhapsody in Blue; and Seventy-Six Trombones, a performance of which aired in the 2010 MDA Labor Day Telethon.

As a quartet singer Wright has won three district championships. He has appeared on national radio and TV broadcasts, and has authored several articles on vocal harmony, as well as a textbook on mathematics and music.
