= Fred (quartet) =

Barbershop quartet

FRED
- Genres: Barbershop
- Members: Jared Carlson – tenor Rick LaRosa – lead Clay Hine – baritone Joe Clay – bass

FRED is a comic barbershop quartet formed in 1990 by members of the Marietta Big Chicken Chorus.

Despite their focus on comedy, FRED produces a very refined sound. Their performance in 1999 at the SPEBSQSA International Championship made them gold medalists, making them the first comedy quartet ever to win first place at the International level.

FRED's take on the "comedy quartet" was original, in that they have not relied on spoken dialog in between songs to set up the humor in the next song, as most comedy quartets do. Instead, their humor is built into their lyrics, musical arrangements, and stage presentation. Parodies are a staple of their performances, and their parodies (well-known songs set to different words) often have Barbershop in-jokes where they poke fun at other quartets and singers, themselves, and even the contest judges.

== SPEBSQSA International competition results ==
FRED has achieved the following results at SPEBSQSA International competitions:

- 1991: 35th place
- 1992: 26th place
- 1993: 27th place
- 1994: 11th place
- 1995: 8th place
- 1996: 4th place
- 1997: 2nd place (silver medal)
- 1998: 4th place
- 1999: 1st place (gold medal)

== Discography ==
- Simply FRED (CD; 1993)
- Get Happy (CD; 1998)
- Putting the HA in HArmony (double-CD; 2000)
- The FreDinci Code (CD; 2006)

Preceded by Revival	SPEBSQSA International Quartet Champions; 1999	Succeeded by Platinum
