= Northwest sound =

Northwest sound may refer to:

- Northwest Sound Men's Chorus, American a cappella group
- Northwest sound (movement), Indie rock movement including Built to Spill
