= Greg Lyne =

American music academic (1946–2022)

Dr. Greg Lyne (September 22, 1946 – January 13, 2022) was an American choral director, arranger, composer and vocal educator. Lyne worked full-time as a coach for choruses and quartets and as a clinician for musical ensembles of all types. He conducted over 300 Festival and All-State Choirs throughout the US, including Alaska and Hawaii, and in Canada, England, Scotland and Russia. In Russia, he presented master classes at the St. Petersburg Conservatory of Music to European musicians. Lyne is the only American listed in the Russian version of Who's Who. He also served as a guest conductor of the Tabernacle Choir at Temple Square.

As a child, Greg was a member of the Columbus Boychoir and moved from Wichita, Kansas, to Princeton, New Jersey, where he was enrolled in the Columbus Boychoir School (later known as the American Boychoir School) which performed with the New York Philharmonic as well as on national tours. Greg's Columbus Boychoir performances also included singing the National Anthem for President Harry S. Truman's 75th Birthday party at the Waldorf Astoria in New York.

Lyne held a doctorate in choral conducting from the University of Northern Colorado. He received his masters in composition from Kansas State University in Manhattan, Kansas. He earned his bachelor of music degree in music education from Washburn University in Topeka, Kansas.

Lyne was Professor of Music and Director of Choral Activities at Arizona State University. Preceding his work there, he served in similar capacities at California State University, Long Beach, DePaul University, Eastern New Mexico University and the University of Washington.

He served as Director of Music Education and Services from 1996 to 2005 for the 34,000-member Barbershop Harmony Society. In this capacity, he served the music education programs of the Society, the world's largest all-male singing organization. Prior to BHS, he directed the Masters of Harmony to three International Chorus Championships of the Barbershop Harmony Society (1990, 1993, & 1996), and the West Towns Chorus to one (1987).

Greg sang tenor for The Personal Touch Quartet which was the 1970 Central States Division Quartet Champion. He was also a replacement baritone for International Quartet Champions Dealer's Choice (quartet).

In 2006, he was the founding director of the San Jose chapter of the Barbershop Harmony Society Voices in Harmony Chorus where he directed the chorus to the Far Western District Chorus Championship and third place international medal. Lyne was also the Founding Artistic Director of Pacific Masterworks Chorus in Dublin, California, and Founding Music Director of Sweet Adelines International Pride of the Pacific in Pleasanton, California.

A published arranger and composer, Lyne was a life member of the American Choral Directors Association. In 2006, he was inducted into the West Towns Chorus Hall of Fame. He was recognized by the Music Educators National Conference for his “contributions and service to Music Education” and was awarded the Barbershop Harmony Society's Joe Liles Lifetime Achievement Award in 2010 as a conductor, arranger, judge, coach, and educator for nurturing students. In 2013, He was inducted into the Barbershop Harmony Society Hall of Fame. He is listed in the International Who's Who in Classical Music and is the author/producer of numerous articles, workbooks and educational videotapes. He is also listed in the Who's Who in a cappella.
