= Louisville Thoroughbreds =

Men's chorus

The Louisville Thoroughbreds are a men's chorus based in Louisville, Kentucky. They are the first seven-time International Champion chorus of the Barbershop Harmony Society, winning gold medals in 1962, 1966, 1969, 1974, 1978, 1981 and 1984.

== Awards and recognition ==
Preceded by Phoenicians	SPEBSQSA International Chorus Champions; 1984	Succeeded by Vocal Majority
Preceded by Dukes of Harmony	SPEBSQSA International Chorus Champions; 1981	Succeeded by Vocal Majority
Preceded by Dukes of Harmony	SPEBSQSA International Chorus Champions; 1978	Succeeded by Vocal Majority
Preceded by Southern Gateway Chorus	SPEBSQSA International Chorus Champions; 1974	Succeeded by Vocal Majority
Preceded by Pekin Chorus	SPEBSQSA International Chorus Champions; 1969	Succeeded by Dapper Dans of Harmony
Preceded by Miamians	SPEBSQSA International Chorus Champions; 1966	Succeeded by Dapper Dans of Harmony
Preceded by Chorus of the Chesapeake	SPEBSQSA International Chorus Champions; 1962	Succeeded by Pekin Chorus

== See also ==
- List of attractions and events in the Louisville metropolitan area
