= Alexandria Harmonizers =

Barbershop chorus

Background information
- Origin: Alexandria, Virginia, United States
- Genres: Barbershop, Choral
- Years active: 1948–present (77 years)
- Website: harmonizers.org

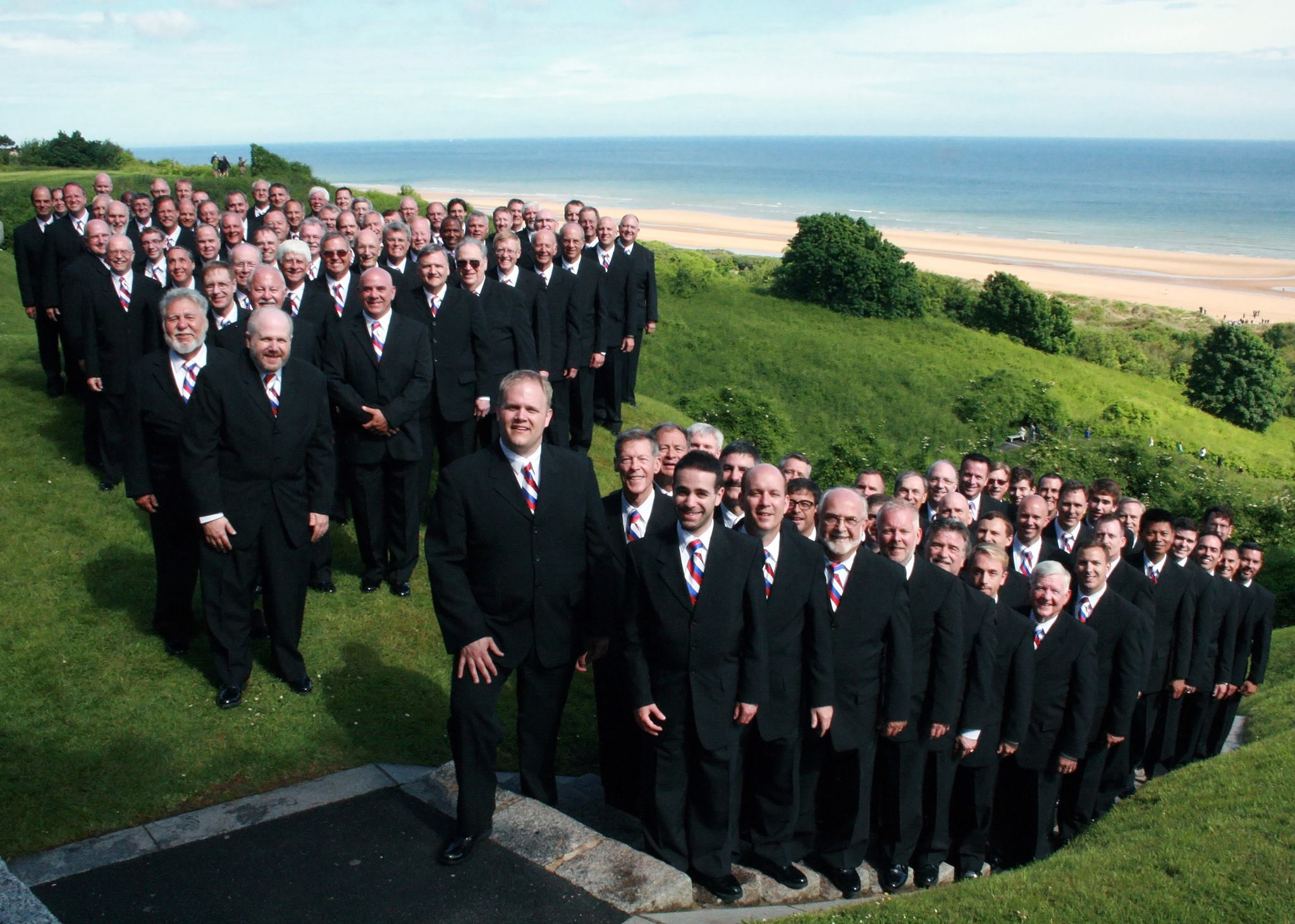
The Harmonizers at Omaha Beach, Normandy, June 2014

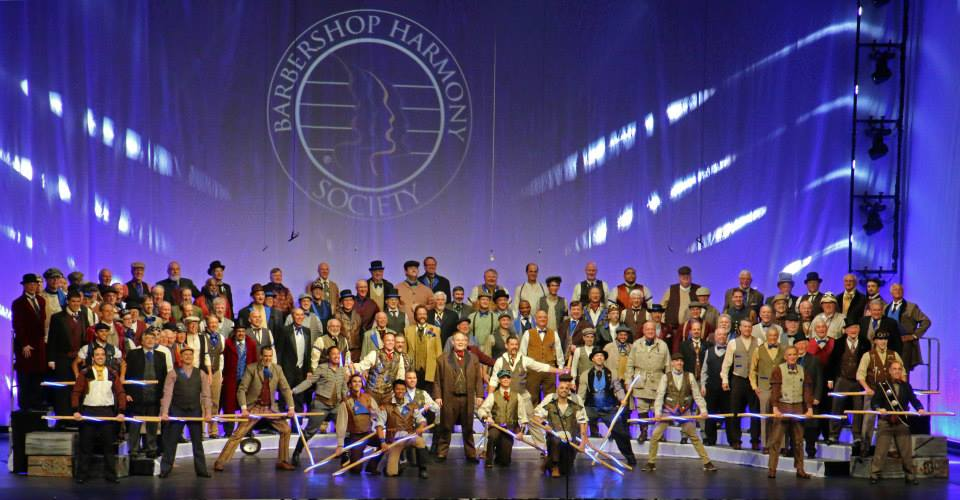
The Harmonizers perform at the BHS International Competition in Pittsburgh PA, 2015

The Alexandria Harmonizers are an international champion barbershop chorus based in Alexandria, Virginia, with 110 men in 2013. The chorus is the performing arm of the Alexandria Chapter of the Barbershop Harmony Society, under the direction of Joseph Cerutti, Jr.
