= Barbershop in Germany =

Music association

- Also known as: BinG
- Genres: A cappella Barbershop music
- Years active: 1991–present
- Website: www.barbershop.de

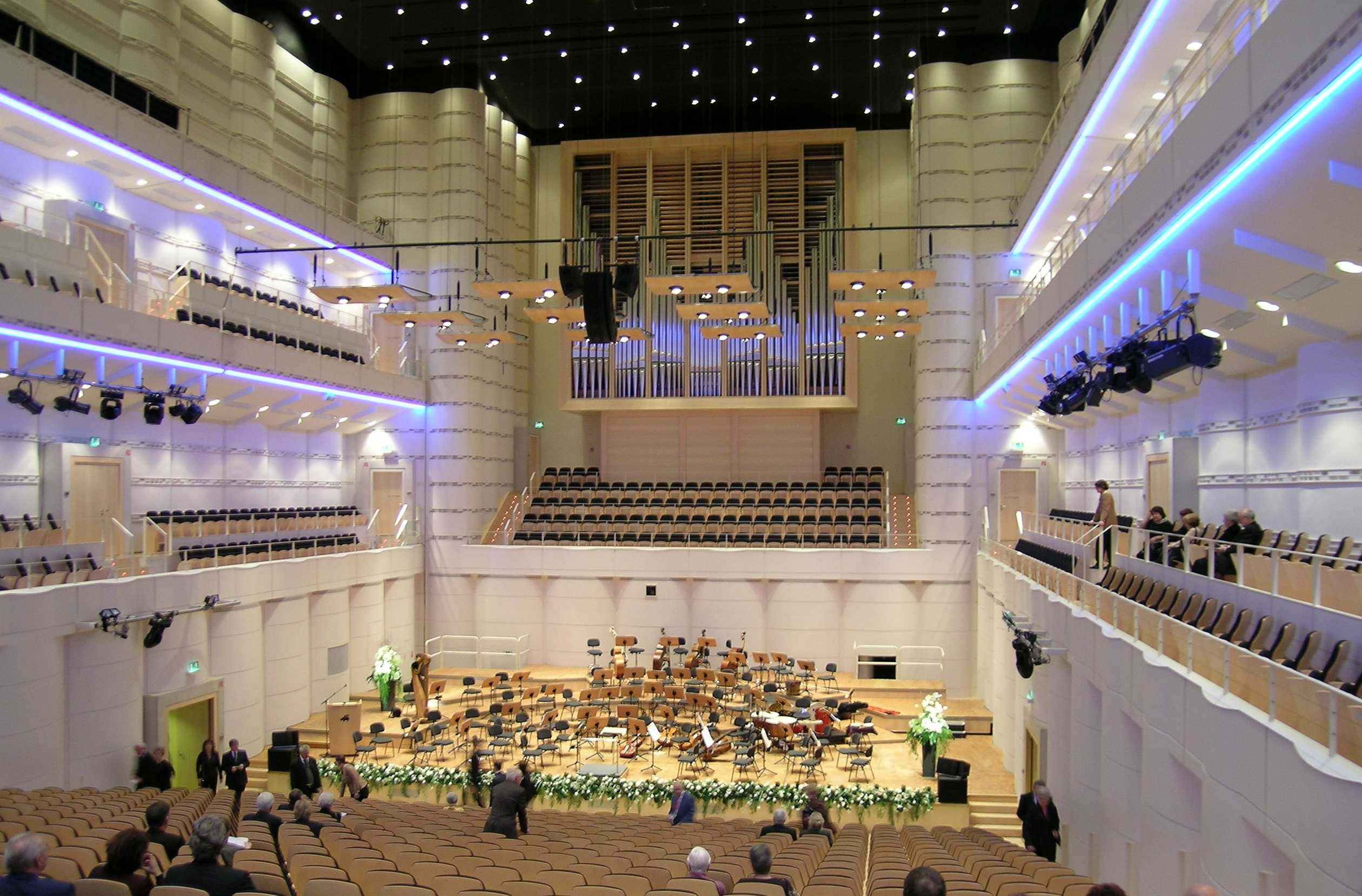
Konzerthaus Dortmund, at which BinG has held contests

Barbershop in Germany (abbreviated BinG or BinG!) is the association for barbershop music in Germany. It was founded in October 1991 and has an official alliance with the US-based Barbershop Harmony Society.

Any representative of a German barbershop quartet or chorus can become a member of BinG, and individuals may also join as supporting members. The association began with two quartets and eight choruses. As of May 2020, membership included about 40 quartets, 20 choruses, and 800 individuals.

== History ==
In 2001 BinG celebrated its 10th anniversary with a grand concert in the concert hall of the University of Münster. The country's first barbershop quartet, Sour Krauts, which had formed locally in 1963, performed at the anniversary concert.

Barbershop Blend became Germany's first ladies barbershop chorus in 1984, and Erster Kölner Barbershop Chor followed in 1987 as the first German men's barbershop chorus.

Julia Moldenhauer holds the position of first chairwoman of BinG. Manfred Adams was a former president, having held the role in much of the 1990s and resuming leadership in 2004 until resigning in 2016. Adams is the musical director of the Ladies First chorus from Dortmund.

== Champions ==
BinG organizes a biennial Barbershop Music Festival, which includes national and "World Mixed" championships for quartets and choruses. The association's national champions are:

Year	Chorus	Quartet	Venue city	Ref
2026	Pending	Pending	Wuppertal	
2024	BinG! Youth	Veto	Dortmund	
2023	Harmunichs	Chord Cracker	Dortmund	
2022	Festival cancelled		Dortmund	
2020	Festival cancelled		Dortmund	
2018	Harmunichs	SomeSing	Munich	
2016	Harmunichs	Klangküsse	Munich	
2014	Ladies First	Tonikum	Dortmund	
2012	Ladies First	Klangküsse	Dortmund	
2010	Ladies First	Klangküsse		
2008	Ladies First	Klangküsse		
2006	Harmunichs	Inflagranti		
2004	Barbershop Blend	Inflagranti		
2002	Ladies First	Splash!		
2000	Ladies First	Take Four		
1998	Ladies First	Splash!		
1996	Ladies First	Take Four		
1995	–	Take Four		
1994	Ladies First	Take Four		
1993	Ladies First	Viertakt	Cologne	
