= List of Barbershop Harmony Society chorus champions =

This page lists the Barbershop Harmony Society's international chorus champions by the year within which they won. Choruses are eligible to win any number of times but must sit out for two years after they win. The only non-U.S. choruses to win this championship were The Dukes Of Harmony (1977 & 1980) and the Toronto Northern Lights (2013), both from Canada. The Dallas-based Vocal Majority has won this competition a record 14 times. Disruption caused by the COVID-19 pandemic resulted in cancellation of the 2020 and 2021 chorus contests.

- 2026 – Ambassadors of Harmony
- 2025 – Vocal Majority
- 2024 – Westminster Chorus
- 2023 – Ambassadors of Harmony
- 2022 – Music City Chorus
- 2021 – No champion; contest cancelled due to the COVID-19 pandemic
- 2020 – No champion; contest cancelled due to the COVID-19 pandemic
- 2019 – Westminster Chorus
- 2018 – Vocal Majority
- 2017 – Masters of Harmony
- 2016 – Ambassadors of Harmony
- 2015 – Westminster Chorus
- 2014 – Vocal Majority
- 2013 – Toronto Northern Lights
- 2012 – Ambassadors of Harmony
- 2011 – Masters of Harmony
- 2010 – Westminster Chorus
- 2009 – Ambassadors of Harmony
- 2008 – Masters of Harmony
- 2007 – Westminster Chorus
- 2006 – Vocal Majority
- 2005 – Masters of Harmony
- 2004 – Ambassadors of Harmony
- 2003 – Vocal Majority
- 2002 – Masters of Harmony
- 2001 – New Tradition Chorus
- 2000 – Vocal Majority
- 1999 – Masters of Harmony
- 1998 – Alexandria Harmonizers
- 1997 – Vocal Majority
- 1996 – Masters of Harmony
- 1995 – Alexandria Harmonizers
- 1994 – Vocal Majority
- 1993 – Masters of Harmony
- 1992 – Southern Gateway Chorus
- 1991 – Vocal Majority
- 1990 – Masters of Harmony
- 1989 – Alexandria Harmonizers
- 1988 – Vocal Majority
- 1987 – West Towns Chorus
- 1986 – Alexandria Harmonizers
- 1985 – Vocal Majority
- 1984 – Thoroughbred Chorus
- 1983 – Phoenicians
- 1982 – Vocal Majority
- 1981 – Thoroughbred Chorus
- 1980 – Dukes of Harmony
- 1979 – Vocal Majority
- 1978 – Thoroughbred Chorus
- 1977 – Dukes of Harmony
- 1976 – Phoenicians
- 1975 – Vocal Majority
- 1974 – Thoroughbred Chorus
- 1973 – Southern Gateway Chorus
- 1972 – Phoenicians
- 1971 – Chorus of the Chesapeake
- 1970 – Dapper Dans of Harmony
- 1969 – Thoroughbred Chorus
- 1968 – Pekin Chorus
- 1967 – Dapper Dans of Harmony
- 1966 – Thoroughbred Chorus
- 1965 – Miamians
- 1964 – Border Chorders
- 1963 – Pekin Chorus
- 1962 – Thoroughbred Chorus
- 1961 – Chorus of the Chesapeake
- 1960 – Chordsmen
- 1959 – Pekin Chorus
- 1958 – Dixie Cotton Boll Memphis
- 1957 – Californians
- 1956 – Ambassadors of Harmony
- 1955 – Janesville Chorus
- 1954 – Singing Capital Chorus
- 1953 – Great Lakes Chorus

== See also ==
- List of Barbershop Harmony Society quartet champions
- Sweet Adelines International competition
