= Barbershop Harmony Society =

Barbershop music organization

Coordinates: 36°9′36″N 86°46′52″W

Background information
- Also known as: Society for the Preservation and Encouragement of Barber Shop Quartet Singing in America, Inc.
- Origin: Tulsa, Oklahoma
- Genres: A cappella Barbershop music
- Years active: 1938–present
- Members: 14,000 (2023)
- Website: www.barbershop.org

The Barbershop Harmony Society, legally and historically named the Society for the Preservation and Encouragement of Barber Shop Quartet Singing in America, Inc. (SPEBSQSA), is the first of several organizations to promote and preserve barbershop music as an art form. Founded by Owen C. Cash and Rupert I. Hall in Tulsa, Oklahoma, in 1938, the organization quickly grew, promoting barbershop harmony among men of all ages. As of 2014, just under 23,000 men in the United States and Canada were members of this organization, whose focus is on a cappella music. The international headquarters was in Kenosha, Wisconsin, for fifty years before moving to Nashville, Tennessee, in 2007. In June 2018, the society announced it would allow women to join as full members.

A parallel women's singing organization, Sweet Adelines International (SAI), was founded in 1945. A second women's barbershop harmony organization, Harmony, Incorporated, broke from SAI in 1959 over an issue of racial exclusion, with SAI (like SPEBSQSA and many other organizations) being white-only at that time; SPEBSQSA officially lifted the requirement in 1963. Several international affiliate organizations, in countries around the world, add their own flavor to the signature sound of barbershop harmony.

Since November 1941, the organization has published a bi-monthly magazine titled The Harmonizer.

== Name ==
The original name SPEBSQSA was intended as a lampoon on Roosevelt's New Deal alphabet agencies. Because of the name's length and the difficult-to-pronounce acronym, society staff and members often refer to SPEBSQSA as The Society. For decades, SPEBSQSA was the official name, while the Barbershop Harmony Society was an officially recognized and sanctioned alternate. Members were encouraged to use the alternate name, because it was felt that the official name was an in-joke that did not resonate outside the Society. In mid-2004, faced with declining membership, the Society adopted a marketing plan that called for using "Barbershop Harmony Society" consistently and retaining the old name for certain legal purposes.

The old official name spelled "barber shop" as two words, while barbershop is generally used elsewhere.

In reference to the acronym SPEBSQSA, The Society has said "attempts to pronounce the name are discouraged". Unofficially, it is sometimes pronounced as if it were spelled "Spebsqua".

Sharp Harmony, a Norman Rockwell painting, appeared on the cover of The Saturday Evening Post magazine issue dated September 26, 1936; it depicts a barber and three clients enjoying a cappella song. The image was adopted by SPEBSQSA in its promotion of the art.

In late 2004, the Society established Barbershop Harmony Society as its new "brand name", with a logo and identity program released in 2005. The legal name remained SPEBSQSA, Inc.

== Preservation ==
A key aspect of the Society's mission is in the preservation of barbershop music. To this end, it maintains the Old Songs Library. Holding over 100,000 titles (750,000 sheets) this is the largest sheet music collection in the world, excepting only the Library of Congress.

The "Barberpole Cat Program" is a collection of 12 songs (commonly known as "polecats") that are considered standard repertoire for every barbershopper ("Let Me Call You Sweetheart", "My Wild Irish Rose", etc.) Every member receives a booklet upon joining the society. The purpose of this collection is so that whenever any barbershoppers meet they will always have something ready to sing. The society has also published collections such as Strictly Barbershop.

Harmony Foundation International, a 501(c)(3) not-for-profit organization, was incorporated in 1959 as a charitable subsidiary of the Barbershop Harmony Society; it raises financial support for the society's programs.

== Headquarters and membership ==
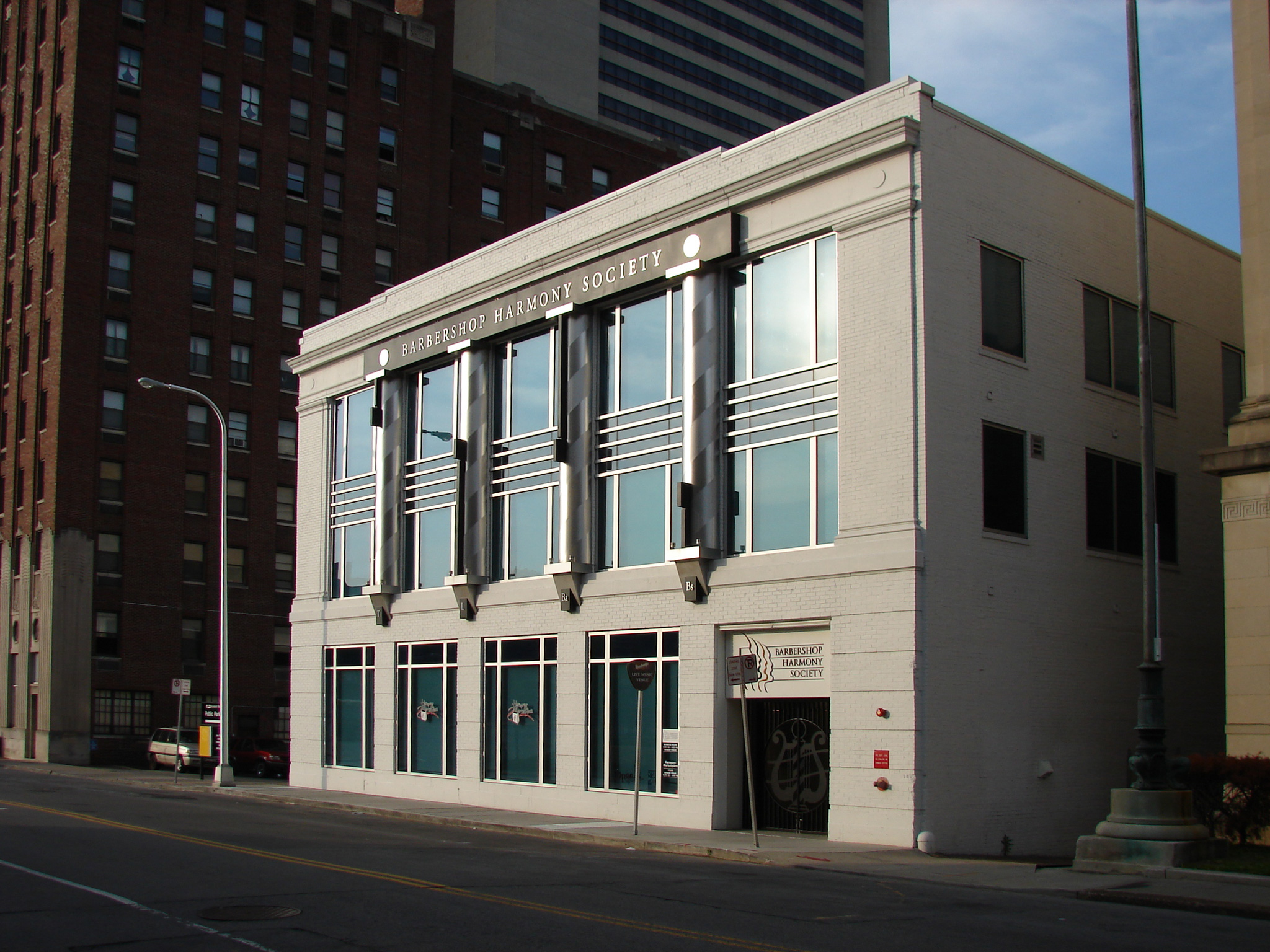
Current headquarters in Nashville

In 2003, in preparation for a new headquarters location, the Society sold both Harmony Hall, a historic lakefront mansion in Kenosha, Wisconsin, and its nearby facility (known as Harmony Hall West) located in a strip mall which the Society purchased in 1976 and renovated. HHW had housed finance, merchandising, IT and membership. Operations and staff from both buildings were consolidated into a remodeled HHW.

In 2006 the Society announced plans to move its headquarters to Nashville, Tennessee. In August 2007, the Society completed the relocation to 110 Seventh Avenue North, in Nashville.

In June 2018, the society announced it would allow women to join as full members, with each chapter deciding whether to remain all-male or add a mixed or all-women's chorus. Since 2009, women had been allowed to join as associates.

== Contests ==
To promote and improve barbershop singing, the society annually runs international and district-level contests for choruses and quartets.

When a quartet wins the international gold medal, the foursome is considered champions forever and may not compete again. A chorus that wins the gold must sit out only for the next two competitions.

=== International quartet champions ===
- GQ (Girls Quartet), the current 2026 champions. They are the first female quartet to win.
- Musical Island Boys, the 2014 champions from New Zealand, are also the 2006 collegiate champions.
- Ringmasters, the 2012 champions and 2008 collegiate champions, are from Sweden. They were the first quartet from outside of North America to win.
- Old School, the 2011 champions, reunited multiple-time winners Kipp Buckner and Joe Connelly from the 1987 champions Interstate Rivals.
- OC Times, 2008 champions.
- Vocal Spectrum, the 2006 champions were previously the 2004 collegiate champions.
- Realtime, in 2005 became the first truly international champions, with members from three nations.
- Bluegrass Student Union, the 1978 champions, had a 33-year career ending in 2006; they produced innovative recordings still available.
- Happiness Emporium, 1975 champions, remained active through October 2013.
- The Suntones, 1961 champions, were regularly seen on The Jackie Gleason Show.
- The Buffalo Bills, 1950 champions were widely known, as they appeared in stage and screen productions of The Music Man and frequently appeared on Arthur Godfrey's radio show.

=== Chorus champions ===
- The Vocal Majority, based in Dallas, Texas, fourteen-time International Chorus Champions (1975, 1979, 1982, 1985, 1988, 1991, 1994, 1997, 2000, 2003, 2006, 2014, 2018, 2025) – the chorus with the most international gold medals, ten of which were in succession (each time the chorus was eligible to compete) until 2009.
- The Ambassadors of Harmony, based in St. Charles, Missouri, six-time International Chorus Champions (2004, 2009, 2012, 2016, 2023, and 2026) Their 2009 championship interrupted the Vocal Majority's streak at 10 consecutive championships.
- The Masters of Harmony, nine-time International Chorus Champions (1990, 1993, 1996, 1999, 2002, 2005, 2008, 2011, 2017).
- The Westminster Chorus, initially a youth barbershop chorus in California started by young members of the Masters of Harmony, then expanded into a chorus with members of all ages; International Chorus Champions in 2007, 2010, 2015, 2019, and 2024.
- The Louisville Thoroughbreds Chorus, the society's first 7-time International Chorus Champions, winning in 1962, 1966, 1969, 1974, 1978, 1981 and 1984.

=== Awards ===
In 2020, the society inaugurated an annual Awards Gala to "amplify and celebrate" those who have impacted the barbershop genre via excellence and service. Award nominations are accepted from January into February, selected nominees announced in April, and winners made known during the black tie gala held early in the week of the international contests. Awards are given for the Barbershopper, Quartet, Ensemble, Arranger, Innovator, Ambassador, Album, and Video of the Year, as well as Lifetime Achievement for an Arranger. Several pre-existent awards and honors are also now announced at the gala, including Hall of Fame, Honorary Membership, Harmony Fellows (50-year members) and the Joe Liles Lifetime Achievement Award (for a chorus director). With the inaugural year's international convention canceled due to COVID-19, a virtual awards event was held on September 14, 2020.

Year	Video	Album	Innovator	Arranger	Lifetime Achievement		Ambassador	Ensemble	Quartet	Barbershopper
Year	Video	Album	Innovator	Arranger	Director	Arranger	Ambassador	Ensemble	Quartet	Barbershopper
2019	Spider-Man by Midtown	Volume III by GQ	Barbershop Revival	Theo Hicks	Greg Clancy	20 names: Renee Craig, Aaron Dale, Tom Gentry, Jay Giallombardo, Don Gray, S.K. Grundy, David Harrington, Val Hicks, Clay Hine, Walter Latzko, Joe Liles, Earl Moon, Lou Perry, Sigmund Spaeth, Dave Stevens, Burt Szabo, Greg Volk, Ed Waesche, David Wright, Larry Wright	Barberdrunk	Alexandria Harmonizers	The Newfangled Four	Will Downey

==== Hall of Fame ====
Since 2004, the society's Hall of Fame recognizes quartets and individual members who have made exceptional contributions to barbershop as a whole.

2000s
Year	Recipients
2004	Carroll Adams, Harold "Bud" Arburg, The Buffalo Bills, O.C. Cash, Floyd Connett, Phil Embury, Rupert Hall, Val Hicks, Freddy King, C.T. "Deac" Martin, Geoffrey O'Hara, Maurice "Molly" Regan, Dean Atlee Snyder, Sigmund Spaeth, Wilbur Sparks, Frank Thorne
2005	Jim Clancy, Joe Stern, Dave Stevens, Robert D. Johnson, Jim Miller, The Suntones, Ed Waesche
2006	Don Amos, S.K. Grundy, Warren "Buzz" Haeger, Walter Latzko, Marty Mendro, Lou Perry, Hal Staab
2007	Larry Ajer, The Confederates, Joe Liles, Lloyd Steinkamp
2008	The Gas House Gang, George L. Shields, Dan Waselchuk, David Wright
2009	Gene Cokecroft, Hugh Ingraham, Roger Lewis, Richard Mathey, Jim Richards, Burt Szabo

2010s
Year	Recipients
2010	Willis Diekema, Daryl Flinn, Mac Huff, Lyle Pilcher, Mid-States Four
2011	Earl Moon, Jerry Orloff
2012	Bluegrass Student Union, Jay Giallombardo, Rudy Hart, Lou Laurel, Drayton Justus
2013	Greg Backwell, Greg Lyne, Charles David "Bub" Thomas
2014	Mo Rector, Boston Common, 139th Street Quartet
2015	Dealer's Choice
2016	John D. Miller, The Four Renegades
2017	Robert G. "Rob" Hopkins
2018	Ray Danley, the Easternaires quartet
2019	Jim Henry

2020s
Year	Recipients
2020	Alan Lamson, Kevin Keller
2021	no honorees
2022	Joe Connelly, Tony De Rosa, Tim Waurick
2023	Renee Craig, Vocal Spectrum
2024	Steve Armstrong, Aaron Dale, Tom Gentry, Clay Hine
2025	Mark Hale
2026	Cindy Hansen Ellis, Keepsake

== Districts ==
For purposes of administration, particularly of local education and contests, the society is organized into 17 geographical districts as follows. (Chapter quantities are as of April 2024.)

- Cardinal District – Kentucky, Indiana: 17 chapters
- Carolinas District – North Carolina, South Carolina, plus Savannah, Georgia: 23 chapters
- Central States District – Missouri, Iowa, most of Kansas, eastern Nebraska, eastern South Dakota, plus Bella Vista, Arkansas: 49 chapters
- Evergreen District – Washington, Oregon, Alaska, western Idaho, most of Montana, Alberta, British Columbia: 46 chapters
- Far Western District – California, Arizona, Nevada, Hawaii, southwestern Utah: 63 chapters
- Illinois District – Illinois: 25 chapters
- Johnny Appleseed District – Ohio; western West Virginia; southwestern Pennsylvania: 37 chapters
- Land O' Lakes District – Wisconsin, Minnesota, North Dakota, northwestern Michigan, western Ontario, Manitoba, Saskatchewan: 37 chapters
- Mid-Atlantic District – Virginia, Maryland, eastern Pennsylvania, New Jersey, Delaware, Washington, D.C., eastern West Virginia, southeastern New York: 73 chapters
- Northeastern District – northeastern New York, Connecticut, Massachusetts, Maine, New Hampshire, Rhode Island, Vermont, New Brunswick, Newfoundland and Labrador, Nova Scotia, Quebec: 42 chapters
- Ontario District – most of Ontario: 24 chapters
- Pioneer District – most of Michigan, plus Sault Ste. Marie and Windsor, Ontario: 21 chapters. It became the first organized district of the society on June 8, 1940 and the first International District in March 1944.
- Rocky Mountain District – Colorado, Wyoming, northern New Mexico, most of Utah, eastern Idaho, western Kansas, southeastern Montana, western Nebraska, western South Dakota: 28 chapters
- Seneca Land District – western New York, northwestern Pennsylvania: 25 chapters
- Southeastern Harmony District – Tennessee, Mississippi, Alabama, most of Georgia: 18 chapters
- Southwestern District – Texas; Louisiana; most of Arkansas; Oklahoma: 31 chapters
- Sunshine District – Florida: 30 chapters

Two chapters (Hell's Kitchen, New York and Loveland, Colorado) are not part of any district.

== Affiliates ==
- British Association of Barbershop Singers (BABS) – United Kingdom: 60 choruses
- Barbershop Harmony Australia (BHA) – Australia: 41 choruses
- Barbershop Harmony New Zealand (BHNZ) – New Zealand: 15 choruses
- Barbershop in Germany (BinG!) – Germany: 22 choruses
- Dutch Association of Barbershop Singers (Holland Harmony) – Netherlands: 28 choruses
- Finnish Association of Barbershop Singers (FABS) – Finland: 4 choruses
- Irish Association of Barbershop Singers (IABS) – Ireland: 12 choruses
- Spanish Association of Barbershop Singers (SABS) – Spain: 7 choruses
- Society of Nordic Barbershop Singers (SNOBS) – Sweden: 9 choruses
- Southern Part of Africa Tonsorial Singers (SPATS) – South Africa

== See also ==
- A cappella music
- Barbershop Arrangements
- Barbershop music
- Harmony, Incorporated Women's Barbershop organization
- Sweet Adelines International Women's Barbershop organization
- American Harmony documentary film about barbershop music
- List of Barbershop Harmony Society chorus champions
