= Barbershop music =

Type of vocal harmony

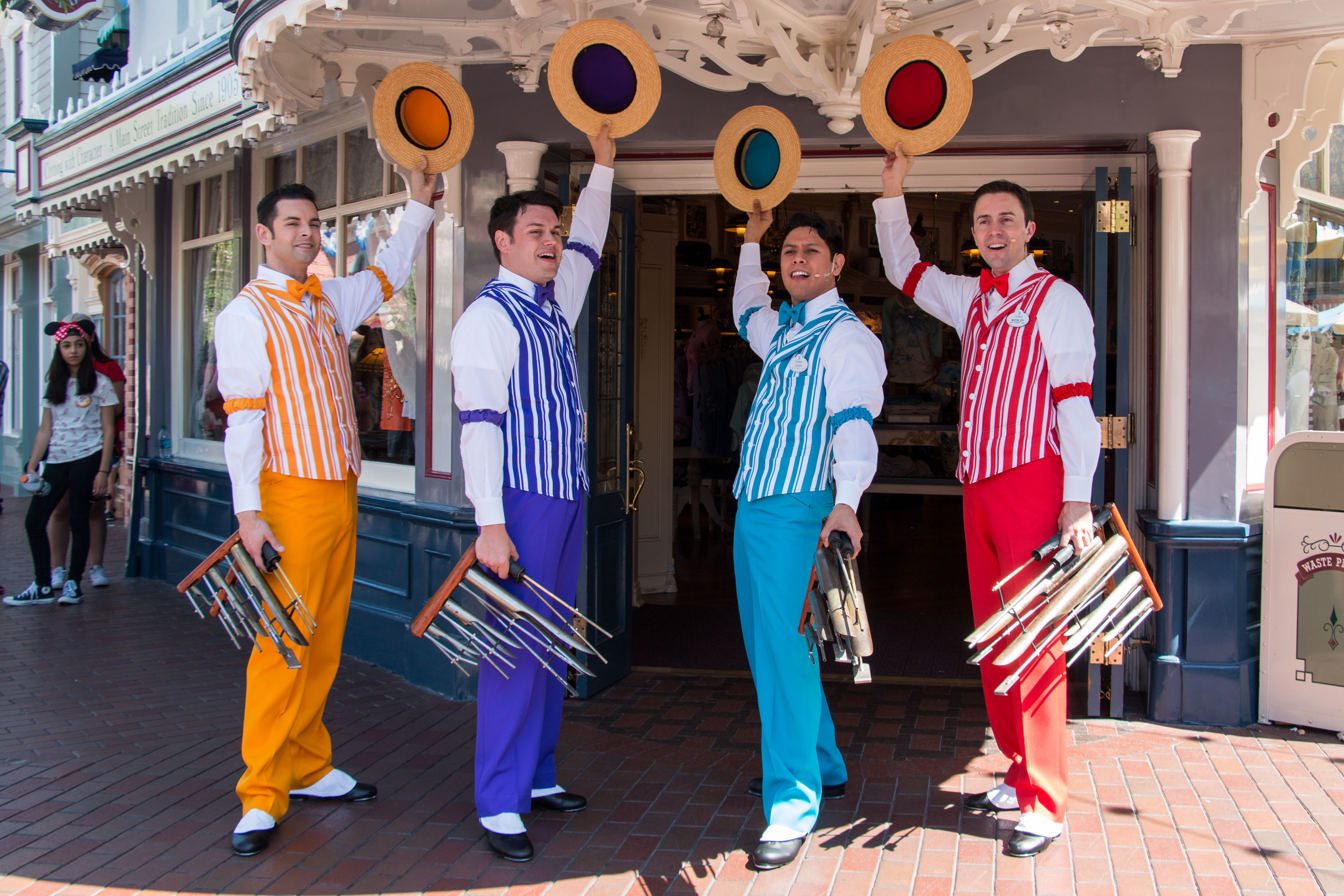
The Dapper Dans barbershop quartet, at Disneyland's Main Street, USA

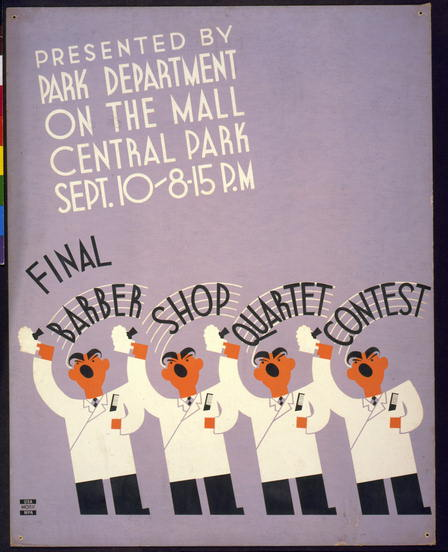
WPA poster, 1936

Barbershop music is a style of a cappella close harmony and vocal harmony, or unaccompanied vocal music, characterized by consonant four-part chords for every melody note in a primarily homorhythmic texture. Each of the four parts has its own role: generally, the lead sings the melody, the tenor harmonizes above the melody, the bass sings the lowest harmonizing notes, and the baritone completes the chord, usually below the lead. Short segments of bass or tenor melody, for variety or to feature particular singers, are not uncommon, but the bulk of the melody must be in an "inner voice" (lead or baritone; in practice almost always lead). In addition, parts other than lead may take the melody in passing tones to avoid awkward voice leading, in tags or codas, or when some appropriate embellishment can be created. One characteristic feature of barbershop harmony is the use of what is known as "snakes" and "swipes". This is when a chord is altered by a change in one or more non-melodic voices. Occasional passages may be sung by fewer than four voice parts.

Barbershop music is generally performed by either a barbershop quartet, a group of four singers which sings four-part harmony, or a barbershop chorus, which closely resembles a choir except for the arranging and performance style of the music.

According to the Barbershop Harmony Society (BHS), "Barbershop music features songs with understandable lyrics and easily singable melodies, whose tones clearly define a tonal center and imply major and minor chords and barbershop (dominant and secondary dominant) seventh chords that resolve primarily around the circle of fifths, while making frequent use of other resolutions." Slower barbershop songs, especially ballads, often eschew a continuous beat, and notes are often held (or sped up) ad libitum.

Aside from the bass, the voice parts in barbershop singing do not correspond closely to their classical music counterparts; the tenor range and tessitura are similar to those of the classical countertenor (including the fact that they sing their highest notes primarily in falsetto, as a countertenor would), the baritone resembles a high lyric baritone in range and a tenor in tessitura, and the lead generally corresponds to the tenor of classical repertoire, with some singers possessing a tessitura more similar to that of a high baritone. Barbershop singing is performed both by men's and women's groups; the elements of the barbershop style and the names of the voice parts are the same for both.

== Characteristics ==
=== Ringing chords ===
Equally tempered dominant seventh chord
A harmonic seventh chord, or "barbershop" chord, approximated with a quarter tone in place of the harmonic seventh

Just harmonic seventh chord
The same chord with just intonation, as tuned by singers to "ring"

The defining characteristic of the barbershop style is the ringing chord, one in which certain overtones of the four voices reinforce each other, sometimes so strongly that the overtone is perceived by the listener as a distinct tone, even though none of the voices are perceived as singing that tone. This effect occurs when the chord, as voiced, contains intervals which have strongly reinforcing overtones (fifths and octaves, for example) that fall in the audible range; and when the chord is sung in perfect just tuning without excessive vibrato. Both of these characteristics are important in many styles of singing, but in barbershop there is an extreme emphasis on them that tends to override other musical values. For example, favored chords in the jazz style are characterized by intervals which do not audibly ring, such as diminished or augmented fifths. For another example, barbershop music is always a cappella, because the presence of fixed-pitch instruments (tuned to equal-temperament rather than just temperament), which is so highly prized in other choral styles, makes perfect just tuning of chords impossible.

The physics and psychophysics of the effect are fairly well understood; it occurs when the upper harmonics in the individual voice notes, and the sum and difference frequencies resulting from nonlinear combinations within the ear, reinforce each other at a particular frequency, strengthening it so that it stands out separately above the blended sound. The effect is audible only on certain kinds of chords, and only when all voices are equally rich in harmonics and justly tuned and balanced. It is not heard in chords sounded on modern keyboard instruments, due to the slight tuning imperfection of the equal-tempered scale.

Gage Averill writes that "Barbershoppers have become partisans of this acoustic phenomenon" and that "the more experienced singers of the barbershop revival (at least after 1938) have self-consciously tuned their dominant seventh and tonic chords in just intonation to maximize the overlap of common overtones." However, "In practice, it seems that most leads rely on an approximation of an equal-tempered scale for the melody, to which the other voices adjust vertically in just intonation."

What is prized is not so much the "overtone" itself, but a sound whose achievement is most easily recognized by the presence of the "overtone". The synchrony of the waveforms of the four voices creates the perception of a "fifth voice" while at the same time melding the four voices into a unified sound. The ringing chord is qualitatively different in sound from an ordinary musical chord e.g. as sounded on a tempered-scale keyboard instrument.

Most elements of the "revivalist" style are related to the desire to produce these ringing chords. Performance is a cappella to prevent the distracting introduction of equal-tempered intonation, and because listening to anything but the other three voices interferes with a performer's ability to tune with the precision required. Barbershop arrangements stress chords and chord progressions that favor "ringing", at the expense of suspended and diminished chords and other harmonic vocabulary of the ragtime and jazz forms.

The dominant seventh-type chord is so important to barbershop harmony that it is called the "barbershop seventh". BHS arrangers believe that a song should contain dominant seventh chords anywhere from 35 to 60 percent of the time (measured as a percentage of the duration of the song rather than a percentage of the chords present) to sound "barbershop".

Historically barbershoppers may have used the word "minor chord" in a way that is confusing to those with musical training. Averill suggests that it was "a shorthand for chord types other than major triads", and says that the use of the word for "dominant seventh-type chords and diminished chords" was common in the late nineteenth century. A 1910 song called "Play That Barber Shop Chord" (often cited as an early example of "barbershop" in reference to music) contains the lines:

'Cause Mister when you start that minor part
I feel your fingers slipping and a grasping at my heart,
Oh Lord play that Barber shop chord!

Averill notes the hints of rapture, "quasi-religion" and erotic passion in the language used by barbershoppers to describe the emotional effect. He quotes Jim Ewin as reporting "a tingling of the spine, the raising of the hairs on the back of the neck, the spontaneous arrival of goose flesh on the forearm ... the fifth note has almost mysterious propensities. It's the consummation devoutly wished by those of us who love Barbershop harmony. If you ask us to explain why we love it so, we are hard put to answer; that's where our faith takes over." Averill notes too the use of the language of addiction, "there's this great big chord that gets people hooked." An early manual was entitled "A Handbook for Adeline Addicts".

He notes too that "barbershoppers almost never speak of 'singing' a chord, but almost always draw on a discourse of physical work and exertion; thus, they 'hit', 'chop', 'ring', 'crack', 'swipe', and 'bust.' Vocal harmony is interpreted as an embodied musicking. Barbershoppers never lose sight (or sound) of its physicality."

== Historical origins ==
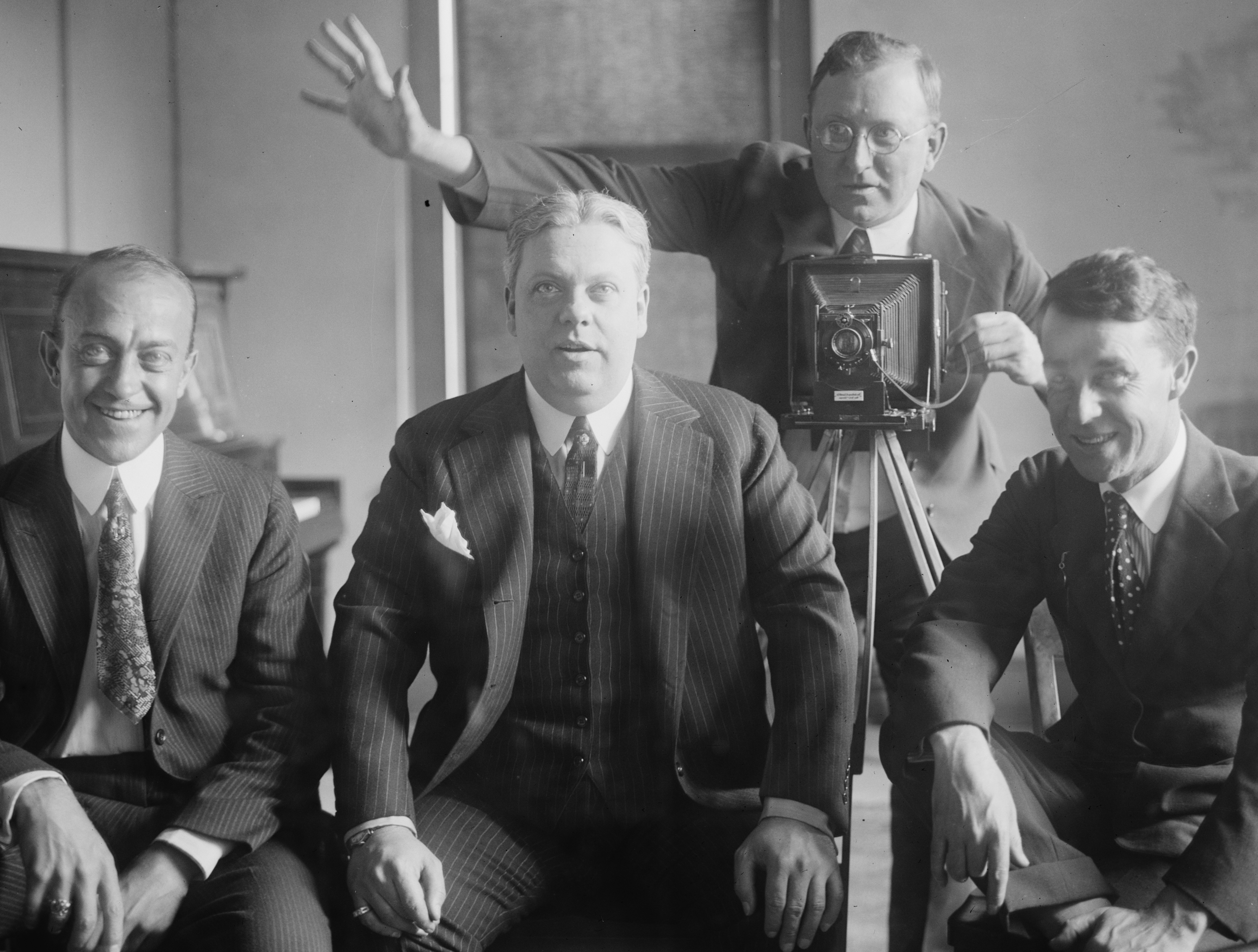
The Peerless Quartet in 1922, featuring singers (left to right) John H. Meyer, Henry Burr, Albert Charles Campbell, and Frank Croxton.

English "barber's music" was described in the 17th century by Samuel Pepys as amateur instrumental music. The Encyclopædia Britannica considers the 19th-century origins of the quartet style as "obscure", possibly referring back to barber's music, or dating to when barbershops served as community centers, where men would gather for social and musical activities with barbers traditionally being musicians.

Historical memoirs and journalism indicate a strong tradition of quartet singing among young African-American men, gathering informally to "crack up a chord". This was acknowledged as early as 1882, when a New York Age writer traced the development of this singing as a home-grown amusement, arising from the exclusion of Black people from theaters and concert halls. Jazz musician Louis Armstrong told of having harmonized on New Orleans street corners as a boy, and NAACP executive secretary James Weldon Johnson "grew up singing barbershop harmony".

Later, white minstrel singers adopted the style, and in the early days of the recording industry their performances were recorded and sold. Early standards included songs such as "Shine On, Harvest Moon", "Hello, Ma Baby", and "Sweet Adeline". Johnson noted in the 1920s how the genre had already crossed racial barriers.

Barbershop music was very popular between 1900 and 1919, and some of the most popular quartets were the Haydn Quartet, the American Quartet, and the Peerless Quartet. Modern barbershop quartets often costume themselves in gaudy versions of the vaudeville dress of this time, with boaters and vertically striped vests. Composer and pianist Scott Joplin incorporated a barbershop quartet into his 1911 opera Treemonisha. The genre gradually faded into obscurity in the 1920s, although barbershop-style harmonies remained in evidence in a cappella forms of traditional black gospel and white gospel.

The modern era of barbershop music is accepted to have begun with a 1940s revival, though opinions as to the genre's origins vary with respect to race, gender, region, and context.

Other researchers argue that today's barbershop music is an invented tradition related to several musical features popular around 1900, including quartet singing and the use of the barbershop chord, but effectively created during the 1940s in the ranks of the Barbershop Harmony Society whilst creating a system of singing contests and its contest rules.

== Organizations ==
Barbershop music is promoted through the use of competition for quartets and choruses run by not-for-profit organizations. Barbershop organizations often provide judging, education, coaching and promotion services for local choruses and quartets.

=== United States ===
In the United States, there are three major organizations which are intended to preserve the style of barbershop music: The Barbershop Harmony Society, a historically men's organization until 2018; SingUnited International (known until 2026 as Sweet Adelines International), a women's organization; and Harmony, Incorporated which splintered off from Sweet Adelines International in 1959. An organization began in 2014 called the Mixed Harmony Barbershop Association to promote mixed harmony barbershop quartets and choruses within the three major organizations and internationally. Another organization called The Society for the Preservation and Propagation of Barbershop Quartet Singing in the United States (SPPBSQSUS) formed in 2018 as a fraternal organization to preserve and perpetuate all-male barbershop quartet singing; since 2024, it operates as the Worldwide Barbershop Quartet Association (WBQA).

==== Barbershop Harmony Society (BHS) ====
The revival of a cappella singing took place circa 1938 when tax lawyer Owen C. Cash sought to save the art form from the threat of radio. He garnered support from investment banker Rupert I. Hall. Both came from Tulsa, Oklahoma. Cash was a partisan of quartet singing who advertised the fact that he did not want a cappella to fall by the wayside. Thousands of men responded. Later the "Society for the Preservation and Encouragement of Barber Shop Quartet Singing in America" was established, known by the abbreviation S.P.E.B.S.Q.S.A. at a time when many institutions in the US used multiple initials to denote their function. The group adopted the alternate name "Barbershop Harmony Society" early in its history. While its legal name has never changed, it changed its official brand name to "Barbershop Harmony Society" in 2004.

For the majority of its history, the society had all-male membership. It was all-white until 1963 when it allowed black members, and since 2018, it allows women to join as members.

==== SingUnited International ====
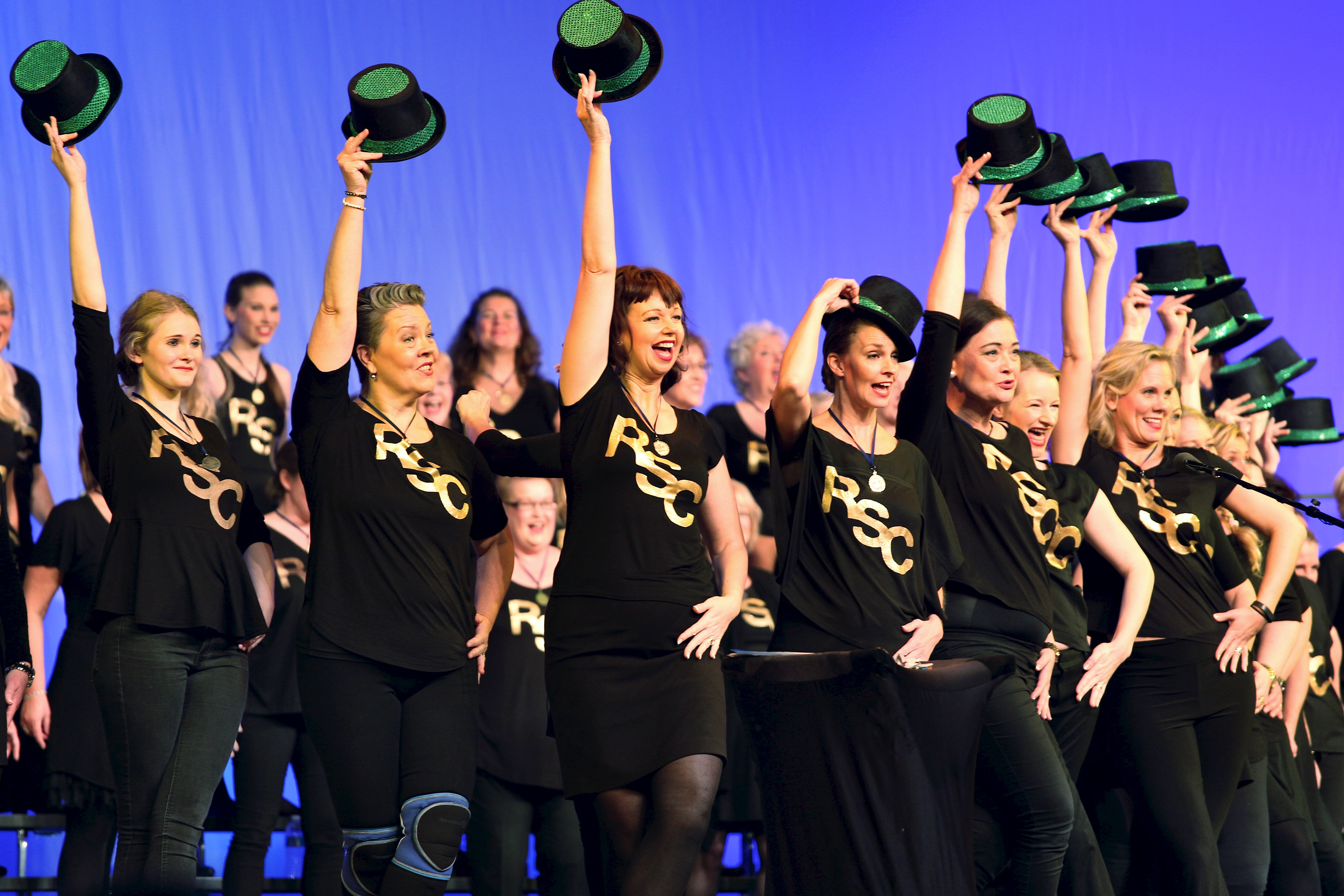
Rönninge Show, the highest ever scoring Sweet Adelines International barbershop chorus.

SingUnited International, a worldwide organization of women singers, was established in 1945 as Sweet Adelines by Edna Mae Anderson of Tulsa, Oklahoma. The aim was to teach and train its members in music and to create and promote barbershop quartets and other musical groups. By year's end, the first chapter incorporated in Oklahoma with Anderson as its president. Sweet Adelines went international on March 23, 1953, when the first chapter outside the U.S. was chartered in Brandon, Manitoba, Canada. Even though there were international chapters, it was not until May 1991 that the name officially changed to Sweet Adelines International. It has a current membership of 23,000 and holds an annual international singing competition. The organization changed its name to SingUnited International in May 2026.

==== Harmony, Incorporated (HI) ====
In 1957, several members of Sweet Adelines International (SAI) broke from the organization in protest of the policy limiting membership to Caucasian women. In 1958, chapters from Rhode Island, Massachusetts, and Orillia, Ontario, also left SAI to form Harmony, Incorporated. (Sweet Adelines changed their policy in 1966).

Harmony, Inc. was incorporated in the State of Rhode Island on February 26, 1959. The founding member chapters of Harmony, Inc. were the Melody Belles of Providence, Rhode Island; Sea Gals of New Bedford, Massachusetts; The Harmonettes from North Attleboro, Massachusetts; Harmony Belles of Barrie-Orillia, Ontario; and the Harborettes from Scituate, Massachusetts.

In 1963, a Sweet Adeline chapter in Ottawa, Ontario was threatened with expulsion after accepting a black woman, Lana Clowes, as a member. As a result, Ottawa's Capital Chordettes left SAI to become the seventh chapter to join Harmony, Incorporated.

In 2013, Harmony, Inc. announced the creation of the Affiliate membership category, extending membership to men involved with the organization.

=== International organizations ===
After the establishment of the above organizations, other countries have begun their organizations to promote Barbershop music. These international organizations are often affiliated with one of the United States organizations listed above or by the World Harmony Council. Some are gender exclusive organizations while some are mixed. They include; British Association of Barbershop Singers, Barbershop Harmony Australia (BHA), Barbershop Harmony New Zealand (BHNZ), Barbershop in Germany (BinG), Finnish Association of Barbershop Singers (FABS), Holland Harmony (HH), Irish Association of Barbershop Singers (IABS), Ladies Association of Barbershop Singers (LABBS) in the United Kingdom, Spanish Association of Barbershop Singers (SABS), Society of Nordic Barbershop Singers (SNOBS) and the Swiss Association of Barbershop Singers (SWABS).

== Performance groups ==
=== Quartets ===
A barbershop quartet is an ensemble of four people who sing a cappella in the exacting barbershop music genre.

In North America, the Barbershop Harmony Society hosts contests for all singers. Female barbershop quartet singers can also compete in SingUnited International or Harmony, Inc., and the Society for the Preservation and Propagation of Barbershop Quartet Singing in the U.S. is available to male singers. Similar organizations exist in other continents and countries.

=== Choruses ===
A barbershop chorus sings a cappella music in the barbershop style. Most barbershop choruses belong to a larger association of practitioners such as the Barbershop Harmony Society, Sweet Adelines International, LABBS (Ladies Association of British Barbershop Singers), BABS (British Association of Barbershop Singers) or Harmony, Inc.

In the Barbershop Harmony Society, a chorus is the main performing aspect of each chapter. In competition, choruses may have as few as 12 members singing, with no upper limit. Choruses normally sing with a director, as distinct from quartets. It is not uncommon for a new quartet to form within a chorus, or for an established quartet affiliated with a given chorus to lose a member (to death, retirement, or relocation) and recruit a replacement from the ranks of the chorus. Choruses can also provide "spare parts" to temporarily replace a quartet member who is ill or out of town.

Unlike a quartet, a chorus need not have equal numbers singing each voice part. According to BHS, the ideal balance of sound in a chorus is about 40% bass, 30% lead, 20% baritone and 10% tenor.

Filling the gap between the chorus and the quartet is what is known as a VLQ or Very Large Quartet, in which more than four singers perform together, with two or more voices on some or all of the four parts. A VLQ possesses greater flexibility than a standard quartet, since they can perform even with one or more singers missing, as long as all four parts are covered. Like a standard quartet, a VLQ usually performs without a director.

== Traditional barbershop songs ==
Barbershop Harmony Society's Barberpole Cat Songs "Polecats"—12 songs which all Barbershop Harmony Society members are encouraged to learn as a shared canonic repertoire—all famous, traditional examples of the barbershop genre:

- "Down by the Old Mill Stream" (by Tell Taylor)
- "Down Our Way" (by Al Stedman & Fred Hughes, arr. Floyd Connett)
- "Honey/Little 'Lize-Medley" (Traditional, arr. Floyd Connett)
- "Let Me Call You Sweetheart" (words by Beth Slater Whitson, music by Leo Friedman)
- "My Wild Irish Rose" (words and music by Chauncey Olcott, arr. Floyd Connett)
- "Shine on Me"
- "The Story of the Rose" ("Heart of My Heart")
- "Sweet Adeline (You're The Flower Of My Heart)"
- "Sweet and Lovely" (by Norm Starks, arr. Mac Huff)
- "Sweet, Sweet Roses of Morn" (Oscar F. Jones and Martin S. Peake 1915)
- "Wait 'Til the Sun Shines, Nellie" (by Andrew B. Sterling and Harry Von Tilzer, arr Warren "Buzz" Haeger)
- "You Tell Me Your Dream (I'll Tell You Mine)"

The Barbershop Harmony Society announced on May 28, 2015, that the "Polecat" program would be expanded to include the following songs:

- "After You've Gone"
- "Bright Was The Night"
- "Caroline"
- "(When It's) Darkness On The Delta" (Levinson, Neiburg, Symes)
- "Drivin' Me Crazy"
- "From The First Hello To The Last Goodbye" (words & music: Johnny Burke)
- "Goodbye, My Coney Island Baby / We All Fall"
- "Hello Mary Lou" (Goodbye Heart)
- "I Don't Know Why (I Just Do)"
- "I've Been Working on the Railroad"
- "Lida Rose / Will I Ever Tell You"
- "Over The Rainbow" (words by E.Y. Harburg and music by Harold Arlen)

Examples of other songs popular in the barbershop genre are:

- "Alexander's Ragtime Band"
- "Come Fly with Me"
- "Hello Ma Baby"
- "In the Good Old Summer Time"
- "Jeanie with the Light Brown Hair"
- "Last Night Was the End of the World"
- "Love Me and the World Is Mine"
- "Shine On, Harvest Moon"
- "Sweet Georgia Brown"
- "Wedding Bells Are Breaking Up That Old Gang of Mine"
- "What'll I Do"
- "Yes Sir, That's My Baby"

While these traditional songs still play a part in barbershop today, barbershop music also includes more current titles. Most music can be arranged in the barbershop style, and there are many arrangers within the aforementioned societies with the skills to include the barbershop chord structure in their arrangements. Today's barbershop quartets and choruses sing a variety of music from all eras—show tunes, pop, and even rock music has been arranged for choruses and quartets, making them more attractive to younger singers.

== See also ==
- List of Barbershop Harmony Society quartet champions & List of Barbershop Harmony Society chorus champions
- List of BABS quartet champions by year
- Sweet Adelines International competition
- American Harmony Documentary Film (2009) about Barbershop music
