= List of professional a cappella groups =

This is a list of notable professional a cappella groups that have an article in Wikipedia.

== A ==
- Acappella
- Anonymous 4
- Acappella Vocal Band
- Amarcord
- Ambassadors of Harmony
- Ardú
- ARORA (formerly SONOS)
- Acoustix
- Anthem Lights
- Acapop! KIDS (2019-2022)

== B ==
- Beatmosphere
- Bella Voce
- Berywam
- The Blanks
- The Blenders
- Blue Jupiter
- The Bobs
- Bounding Main
- Brothers in Harmony
- The Buzztones

== C ==
- Cadence (disbanded in 2020)
- Cantabile - The London Quartet
- Cantus
- Cappella Romana
- Chanticleer
- Chapter 6 (band)
- Chicago a cappella
- Clef Hangers
- Club for Five
- The Coats
- Coco's Lunch
- Committed (vocal group)
- Cosmos (band)
- CU Buffoons

== D ==
- Danny & The Memories (1963-1967)
- Da Vinci's Notebook (disbanded in 2004)
- DCappella (disbanded in 2023)
- Duwende

== E ==
- The Essentials (disbanded in 2011)

== F ==
- FACE
- The Filharmonic
- Five O'Clock Shadow
- The Flying Pickets
- Fool Moon
- Fourth Avenue (Acapella group)

== G ==
- Gas House Gang (disbanded in 2005)
- Gentleman's Rule
- The Gesualdo Six
- GLAD

== H ==
- The Hilliard Ensemble
- Home Free
- The House Jacks
- The Hyannis Sound

== I ==
- The Idea of North

== K ==
- The King's Singers
- The Kwartet

== L ==
- Ladysmith Black Mambazo
- The Longest Johns

== M ==
- The Maccabeats
- Marcsmen
- Maybebop
- Maytree
- The Magnets
- The Manhattan Transfer
- Metro Vocal Group
- Metropolitan Male Quartet
- MICappella
- Monkey Puzzle
- Mosaic
- Mosaiko

== N ==
- Naturally 7
- Neri per Caso
- Noice
- Nota
- Noteworthy
- The Nylons
- New Recording 47

== O ==
- Octappella
- Out of the Blue
- Overboard

== P ==
- Pentatonix
- Perpetuum Jazzile
- The Persuasions
- Pieces of 8
- Pikkardiys'ka Tertsia
- Die Prinzen
- The Puppini Sisters

== R ==
- Rajaton
- The Real Group
- Rescue
- Riltons Vänner
- Ringmasters
- Rock4
- Rockapella

== S ==
- Seminaarinmäen mieslaulajat (Semmarit)
- Singer Pur
- Die Singphoniker
- Six Appeal
- Six13
- Slixs
- SoCal VoCals
- The Soil
- SONO
- Starling Arrow
- Straight No Chaser
- Street Corner Symphony
- Streetnix
- Svetoglas
- Sweet Honey in the Rock
- Sweet Sorrow
- Swingle Singers

== T ==
- Take 6
- The King's Singers
- Tonic Sol-fa
- Toxic Audio

== U ==
- Urban Zakapa

== V ==
- Van Canto
- Vive
- Voca People
- Vocal Point
- Vocal Sampling
- vocaldente
- Voces8
- Voctave
- Voice Male
- VoicePlay

== W ==
- Whiffenpoofs
- Wise Guys
- Witloof Bay
