= List of vocal groups =

== List ==
- Archie Bell & the Drells
- Backstreet Boys
- Bee Gees
- Black Ivory
- Bloodstone
- Blue Magic
- Boney M.
- Boyz II Men
- Brisbane Birralee Voices
- Brownstone
- Cliff Adams Singers
- Crosby Stills & Nash
- Danny & the Juniors
- Dion & the Belmonts
- Dixie Hummingbirds
- Earth, Wind & Fire
- En Vogue
- Exposé
- Frankie Lymon & the Teenagers
- Gladys Knight & the Pips
- Hank Ballard & The Midnighters
- Home Free
- Human Nature
- James Brown & The Famous Flames
- Jay & the Americans
- Jodeci
- Labelle
- Ladysmith Black Mambazo
- Little Anthony & the Imperials
- Little Mix
- Mosaiko
- New Birth
- New Kids on the Block
- New Edition
- Nu Dimension
- NSYNC
- One Direction
- Peter, Paul and Mary
- Rare Silk
- RichGirl
- Martha Reeves & The Vandellas
- SONO
- The Ames Brothers
- The Andrews Sisters
- The Association
- The Bangles
- The Beach Boys
- The Boswell Sisters
- The Chordettes
- The Chantels
- The Charioteers
- The Chi-Lites
- The Chiffons
- The Clovers
- The Coasters
- The Commodores
- The Contours
- The Crew-Cuts
- The Dells
- The Delfonics
- The Delta Rhythm Boys
- The Dramatics
- The Dream Weavers
- The Drifters
- The Eagles
- The Eagles (rhythm and blues group)
- The Emotions
- The Fifth Dimension
- The Five Blind Boys of Mississippi
- The Five Keys
- The Five Satins
- The Flamingos
- The Floaters
- The Foundations
- The Four Aces
- The Four Esquires
- The Four Freshmen
- The Four Knights
- The Four Lads
- The Four Seasons
- The Four Tops
- The Gaylords
- The Golden Gate Quartet
- The Harptones
- The Hilltoppers
- The Hi-Los
- The Impressions
- The Ink Spots
- The Isley Brothers
- The Jackson Five
- The Jordanaires
- The Kingston Trio
- The Lennon Sisters
- The Lettermen
- The Main Ingredient
- The Mamas & the Papas
- The Manhattans
- The Manhattan Transfer
- Los Marcellos Ferial
- The Marcels
- The Marvelettes
- The McGuire Sisters
- The Merry Macs
- The Midnighters
- The Mills Brothers
- The Miracles
- The Modernaires
- The Moonglows
- The Oak Ridge Boys
- The O'Jays
- The Original Drifters
- The Orioles
- The Peerless Quartet
- The Pied Pipers
- The Platters
- The Playmates
- The Pointer Sisters
- The Ravens
- Reparata and the Delrons
- The Revelers
- The Roches
- The Ronettes
- Ruby & the Romantics
- The Seekers
- The Shirelles
- The Sixth Generation
- The Skylarks
- The Skyliners
- The Soul Stirrers
- The Spinners
- The Springfields
- The Statler Brothers
- The Stylistics
- The Supremes
- The Swan Silvertones
- The Temptations
- The Tokens
- Tavares
- The Valentinos
- The Vogues
- The Wanted
- The Weavers
- The Whispers
- Three Dog Night
- Voice of Men
- Voz Veis
- Westlife
- 78violet

== See also ==
- Vocal Group Hall of Fame
