= Terry McManus =

Canadian singer-songwriter (1946–2021)

Terrence McManus (1946 – December 18, 2021) was a Canadian singer-songwriter who is known for launching the Songwriters Association of Canada. He was also an artists manager representing The Birthday Massacre, The Essentials, "Survivorman" Les Stroud, and Canadian experimental artist JoJo Worthington. As an educator he taught at Fanshawe College in London, Ontario, in the Music Industry Arts program for over 30 years, and taught online at Algonquin College in their Music Industry Arts program.

== Early life ==
Terry McManus was born in Abingdon, England to Canadian parents. His father was the medical scientist J. F. A. McManus of Blackville, New Brunswick and his mother, Norma Shumway of Winnipeg, Manitoba. McManus spent most of his childhood in the United States, mainly in Birmingham, Alabama and then Bloomington, Indiana. He attended Hiram Scott College in Nebraska for a brief time, but by 1967 he was working for a computer company in Washington, D.C. He recorded a number of demos at Bias Recording Studios.

== Music and teaching career ==
McManus met producer Paul Rothchild, who took an interest in his music. He moved to Canada in 1968 as a staff writer for ARC Records, and later arranged with Merv Buchanan's Trend Records to borrowed a four-track machine to do some recording. Then McManus's song "Best Believe It" was recorded by Fred Dixon and the Friday Afternoon.

In 1970 he began working for the Ontario Arts Council as a music officer coordinating their new pop music program and he engaged Merv Buchanan's company to do mobile recordings for little-known acts all across Ontario. Part of McManus' time spent with the Council was organizing and producing the first rock concert at Toronto's Ontario Place Forum.

McManus took out a $500 bank loan and with the help of engineer Bill Seddon recorded two songs - "Sunshower in the Spring" and "Gimme a Hand" with Garwood Wallace on guitar and John Woloschuk on bass. McManus arranged recording contract with A & M Records of Canada and their publishing affiliate, Irving Music of Los Angeles. The single, released in 1971, did well on the Canadian charts as did the follow-up singles "Carolyn" and "Love is Wine" in 1972 - all three tunes going to #1 in the Prairies. An album was recorded but disagreements led to the cancellation of the deal with A & M.

While at the Canadian National Music Conference in Vancouver in late 1972, McManus met jazz musician and composer Tommy Banks who was about to start his own label, Century II, in Edmonton. Banks signed McManus as a solo artist, and appointed him the Artists and Repertoire director of his company. McManus moved from Vancouver to Edmonton in 1973, and there worked with a number of acts, including Russ Thornberry, The Original Caste, and Roy Forbes.

McManus began to expand his writing in order to include the work of jazz musicians Tommy Banks, Earl Seymour and Lenny Breau, who were in Edmonton at the time, into his recordings. This led to some small commercial success, and also caught the attention of well-known songwriter George David Weiss. McManus mixed his Edmonton tracks at the Wally Heider Studios in San Francisco and then moved to London, Ontario to take up teaching duties in the new Music Industry Arts Program at Fanshawe College. In 1975 and 1976 McManus made several trips to New York City where he and Weiss did some co-writing. A demo for Columbia Records was recorded but by then McManus had a family and he turned down the opportunity to move to NYC, record for Columbia's Portrait label and work full-time with Weiss.

Although he was teaching full-time, he continued to write and in 1976 another of his songs, "What a Day", was recorded by the Vos Family and used in a promotional campaign to raise funds for the 1976 Montreal Olympics. A couple of years later in 1978 McManus began writing children's songs and forwarded the material to Raffi's label Treble Clef. The result was a children's album, Scrub-A-Dub U. During an appearance at the Hamilton Folk Festival in 1979, McManus met children's performers Bob Schneider and Fred Penner. Penner included McManus' songs on his children's TV show starting the mid-1980s.

In 1981, London promoter Don Jones asked McManus to perform an opening set of material to entertain children at Mr. Dressup appearances. With McManus' experience in music legalities, he was able to help Mr. Dressup (Ernie Coombs) get out of a bad recording contract and the two hit it off working on their own material together. The result was the 1982 album Wake up Mr. Dressup with Friend Terry McManus which was released on A & M and led to several national tours by the duo. By 1985, Access TV in Calgary approached McManus to write material for their kids' show the Magic Ring' which resulted in 81 songs being used in 39 shows from 1985-1991.

In 1986, McManus wrote lyrics to a Rick Wakeman composition called "Heather Carpets" which he re-christened "Heathered Hills". He sent the unsolicited finished product off to Rondor Music in the UK and Wakeman and his publishing company liked the version so much they gave McManus a co-writing credit on the lyric version of the song. In 1987 McManus, concerned with the lack of representation for songwriters in Canada and the inability to copyright songs in Canada, teamed up with music lawyer Stephen Stohn, (Chair of the Canadian Academy of Recording Arts and Sciences) and Donna Murphy (CIRPA) to revive the long dormant Canadian Songwriters Association to which McManus was elected president for four years before becoming Chairman Of the Board.

== The Songwriters Association of Canada ==
The Songwriters Association of Canada (SAC) began in the mid-1980s when a group of songwriters led by Terry McManus were concerned with the lack of input songwriters were having in the music industry, and with the apparent absence of real copyright registration in Canada.

With the help of Stephen Stohn (lyricist and lawyer) and esteemed songwriters such as Eddie Schwartz and Rich Dodson, the Songwriters Association of Canada was founded under the name Canadian Songwriters Association. Gradually the organization has grown from establishing an industry presence to the nurturing of aspiring songwriters including workshops and song review opportunities through song assessments and “Date with a Demo.”

The SAC also established the “Canadian Song Depository” (now the Song Vault), a Canadian copyright registration service that offers a date and time stamp of songwriters' works. In addition, the SAC hosts Bluebird North activities across the country bringing together some of Canada's most inspiring songwriters to share their songs and stories.

== Editorial career ==
Concurrent with his presidency of the Songwriters Association, McManus took the opportunity to publish an editorial “Copyright Should be Forever” in the national magazine of the performing rights society PRO Canada, the precursor to SOCAN.

In the 1990s, McManus began writing essays about men and their relationships, many of which were published in The Globe & Mail newspaper. That led to a self-published book, Husband Father Brother Son, and a request for reprints from around the world. Eventually the editors of the Chicken Soup book series requested one of his essays about marriage for their Chicken Soup; Divorce and Recovery book.

In the early 1990s McManus was asked to write a commercial for a local building company Copp's Buildall. His effort tuned into one of the longest lasting commercial jingles to run in the London area. During that time he discovered a Doo Wop a cappella act called The Essentials singing at a local ice cream stand in London. By the end of his relationship with them in 1998 they were commanding $3000 and up per performance, they had toured England and they had sold over 20,000 CDs.

Also during the 1990s McManus came across several young talented people that he mentored and helped them along the road to achieve their goals. The list includes hit songwriter Deric Ruttan, The Wilsons (Dave Wilson and Kortney Kayle) Greg Hanna and Zach Neil all of whom are now located in Nashville.

In 1997 Billboard Magazine published a year-end editorial by McManus on the importance of singles in the industry, "Singles are the Key to the Record Buying Habit". In it he criticized the industry for killing the single and not offering an alternative. In 2009, that editorial was quoted as one of the “prescient” articles of the 1990s by Steve Knopper in his much praised book about the rise of digital music and the fall of the record companies, Appetite for Self Destruction. The New York Times in its review of the book alluded to that insight as one of the major reasons that record companies ruined their own business model. In 2001 his letter printed in Billboard, “Napster: Revenge of the Single” became one of the most quoted documents of the day, and again McManus’ prediction about the strength of the single was proven out over the years especially by the rise of iTunes.

In 2000 McManus wrote, recorded and released a musical tribute to John Lennon called "Missing John". About.com reviewed it as "one of the best Beatle tribute songs ever recorded." A couple of years later, McManus started to compile all of his thoughts, information and experience that he had experienced in the music business and over the next four years he outlined and then wrote a text for Fanshawe College students titled “The Canadian Music Industry Primer”. The book has now been adopted by Algonquin College for its Music Industry Arts Course and endorsed by several Canadian music organizations.

== The Birthday Massacre ==
In 2006, McManus was approached by some members of the band The Birthday Massacre to help with some business problems and so in early 2007 McManus began managing the band. Since then they have become one of the top Industrial Goth bands in the world. They have toured North America, Europe, Australia and Russia. In 2009 they won the Virgin Mobile Book the Band Contest with over 270,000 worldwide votes. (Virgin Mobile said that they had never seen a better use of Social Media to organize the fans than that by TBM. The band has placed music with J Walter Thomson of NYC for Sunsilk, with Red Bull for an extreme sports site and they have had their songs performed in The Vampire Diary series.

== Les Stroud (Survivorman) ==
In 2012, took on the role of Artist Manager of singer/songwriter and former student Les Stroud “Survivorman”. He arranged Stroud's involvement with the Save the Arctic campaign by Greenpeace who has used Stroud's song and video, “Arctic Mistress” on their website. (Sir Paul McCartney and Radiohead have also worked with Greenpeace on this same campaign.) “Earth Music” is the term coined by McManus to describe the genre which Stroud is so successfully transitioning his career.

McManus continued to be active as a singer, songwriter, author, manager and part-time teacher during his lifetime.

== Death ==
McManus died on December 18, 2021, aged 75. A funeral mass was held on December, 27. His family created a scholarship/bursary in his name for students in the Music Industry Arts program at Fanshawe College.

== Publications ==
- SOCAN magazine: Copyright Should Be Forever
- Billboard Magazine Editorial: The Single is the Key to the Record Buying Habit.
- Billboard Magazine: Napster, Revenge of the Single
- The Songwriters Demo Submission Guide: Keeping Records(Hardcover Writer's Digest)
- "Appetite for Self Destruction": editorial for Billboard
- The Canadian Music Industry Primer.
- The Globe and Mail: Several essays on men and their relationships

== Professional credits ==
- 1968 – 1969: Staff songwriter, Canint Music Toronto, Ontario.
- 1968 – 1970: Recording engineer assistant, Trend Studios Toronto.
- 1969 – 1971: Recording artist, Quality Records; songwriter, Qualrec Music.
- 1970 – 1971: Music Officer, Ontario Arts Council Pop Music Program Responsible for setting up mobile recording studio program and regional concerts.
- 1971 – 1973: Record Producer and Recording Artist A&M Records Canada.
- 1971 – 1973: Staff songwriter Irving Music, Los Angeles, California
- 1973 - 1975: Director of Artists and Repertoire Century 2 Records, Edmonton, Alberta.
- 1975: Composed theme song for the first Olympic Draw on CBC.
- 1975 – 1977: Singer and songwriter Abilene Music NYC (co writing with Hall of Fame songwriter George David Weiss; What a Wonderful World, Lullaby of Birdland, "The Lion Sleeps Tonight", Can't Help Falling In Love)
- 1978 – 1983: Children's recording artist and touring with Mr. Dressup. Produced and recorded two albums.
- 1984 – 1987: Songwriter, artist and producer for Access Public Television in Alberta. Wrote 81 songs for the children's show, The Magic Ring
- 1988 – 1993: Founder and first president of the Songwriters Association of Canada
- 1993 – 1998: Artist Management and Executive Producer for The Essentials (doo wop a cappella group)
- 1993 – 1998: Songwriter, The Fred Penner Show
- 1998 – 2001: Artist management and Executive Producer for Stacey Wheal
- 2005 – 2013: Author, The Canadian Music Industry Primer
- 2006 – present: Artist management for The Birthday Massacre, Artist Management for Les Stroud aka TV Star "Survivorman"
