= Miramichi River Valley =

- Rural community
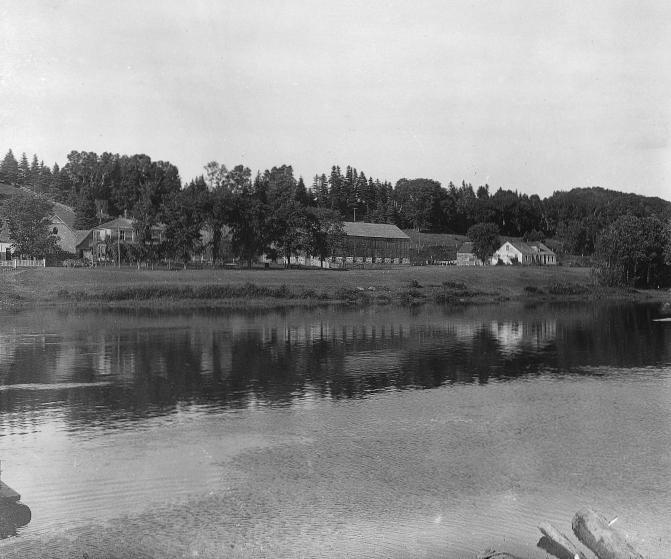

- Location within New Brunswick
- Coordinates: 46°44′06″N 65°49′45″W
- Country: Canada
- Province: New Brunswick
- County: Northumberland
- Regional service commission: Greater Miramichi
- Incorporated: January 1, 2023

Government
  - Type: Rural community council
  - Mayor: Debbie Norton
- Time zone: UTC-4 (AST)
  - Summer (DST): UTC-3 (ADT)
- Website: miramichirivervalley.com

Miramichi River Valley is an incorporated rural community in the Canadian province of New Brunswick. It was formed through the 2023 New Brunswick local governance reforms.

== History ==
Miramichi River Valley was incorporated on January 1, 2023.

== Government ==
Miramichi River Valley residents are able to cast votes in the rural community's elections. The community is within the federal electoral district of Miramichi-Grand Lake, and within the provincial electoral district of Southwest Miramichi-Bay du Vin.

The mayors of Blackville during its time as an incorporated village from 1967 to 2022 included:

1. Lawrence Stephens (1967-1969)
2. Harold Connors (1969-1971)
3. Roland Walls (1971-1992)
4. Glen Hollowood (1992-1998)
5. Roland Walls (1998-2001)
6. Omer MacKenzie (2001-2004)
7. Glen Hollowood (2004-2012)
8. Harold Muck (2012-2013)
9. Matthew Sturgeon (2013)
10. Andrew Hawkes (2013-2016)
11. Christopher Hennessy (2016-2021)
12. Ian Fortune (2021-2022)

== Economy ==
Miramichi River Valley's economy was once tied to the forest industry. A large sawmill that employed 200 workers had been operated in the village by industrial conglomerate UPM Kymmene, but it closed in 2007 as a result of economic pressures.

Miramichi River Valley is home to a single financial institution, Blackville Credit Union. It is the oldest of its kind in New Brunswick.

== Education ==
Blackville School, grades K - 12, is a public school in the community. This is the only grade school in Miramichi River Valley, with students occasionally transporting to other Miramichi schools instead (Such as Miramichi Valley High School).

== Notable people ==
- Herb Curtis
- J. F. A. McManus
- Kathy McCormack
- Marion Leane Smith (Lived her final years and died in Blackville.)

== See also ==
- List of communities in New Brunswick
- List of municipalities in New Brunswick
