= Dicks and Janes =

DJs A Cappella
- Origin: University of Michigan
- Genre: A Cappella
- Years active: 1998 – present
- Website: https://www.djsacappella.com/

The Dicks and Janes (Fall 2016).

DJs A Cappella (formerly known as the Dicks and Janes) is one of the 15 officially recognized a cappella groups of the University of Michigan, according to the Michigan A Cappella Council. Created in 1998, the group continues to perform a cappella music in Ann Arbor, MI and around the country, as well as in the International Championship of Collegiate A Cappella. The group is notable for being featured on three Best of Collegiate A Cappella recordings, as well as hosting Acappellooza, a well-known annual invitational concert. The group is coed and entirely self-run and self-funded.

== History ==
In the Spring of 1998, a musical theatre student named Marc Smollin decided to form an a cappella group. His goal was to have a musical ensemble that not only would perform contemporary a cappella, but also would explore musical tastes that were less mainstream at the University of Michigan, such as blues and vocal jazz. With the help of two producers, Michael Newberry and Heidi J. Powers, and the musical advice of friend Jessica Murphy, he auditioned over 100 U-M students for what was then an unknown and unnamed group. One month later, the name "Rollicking Crew" was chosen, with intentions of being reflective of the UM spirit. This name, however, failed to exemplify the uniqueness and diversity the group upheld. Hence, a new name, "Dicks and Janes," was chosen in August 1998.

Since October 2000, the DJs have hosted "Acappellooza", an a cappella invitational concert that brings other collegiate a cappella groups from across the country to Ann Arbor to perform. In addition to Acappellooza, the DJs also put on a concert during each semester, and goes on tour during each spring break. Past tours have taken them to the East Coast (1999, 2001, 2003, 2004, 2008, 2011), California (2002), and the Southeast (2000, 2006, 2007, 2010). They have performed with and remained close contacts with many groups across the country. The DJs have also had the privilege to sing with professional a cappella groups such as Rockapella (2002), Blue Jupiter (2005), and ElmoTHUMM (2005). In addition, the DJs also perform in many venues around Ann Arbor, including nursing homes, corporate events, Welcome Week events for the University of Michigan, sporting events, and multiple other campus functions.

== International Championship of Collegiate A Cappella ==
The DJs compete annually in the International Championship of Collegiate A Cappella (ICCA). In the 2012 competition, the DJs placed first overall at the Michigan Quarterfinal, followed by second overall at the Midwest Semifinal in St. Louis. In 2007 Mike Rowan took the award for Outstanding Arrangement, Antwaun Stanley received Outstanding Soloist in 2006, 2008, and 2009, and Suresh Mohan received Outstanding Vocal Percussion in 2007. In 2006, they also received Outstanding Soloist (Ben Henri), and Outstanding Arrangement (Christy Lombardi). At the 2004 competition, they also walked away with awards for Outstanding Soloist (Adam Wachter), Outstanding Arrangement (Christy Lombardi), and Outstanding Vocal Percussion (Vivek Natarajan). In 2018, the DJs achieved third place at the ICCA quarterfinal in Ann Arbor, MI. They were also awarded Best Vocal Percussion (Dhanuj Girish). In 2019, the DJs placed second at the Great Lakes Quarterfinal and Taylor Adams was awarded Outstanding Soloist for a cover of "A Tribe Called Red" by Angel Haze. In 2020, the DJs won the Great Lakes Quarterfinal at Hill Auditorium at the University of Michigan. Josie DeRosa, Dhanuj Gandikota, Taylor Adams, and Noah Pinter won Best Choreography for the entire set. Unfortunately, the COVID-19 pandemic halted the remaining competition. In 2022, the DJs won second place at their quarterfinal, winning Best Choreography for the entire set, as well as the vocal percussionist (Niko Economos) winning Best Vocal Percussion for the whole set. In 2025, they advanced to semifinals in Milwaukee, Wisconsin. In 2026, the DJs placed third at quarterfinals, with Ethan Steiner winning outstanding vocal percussionist for "Feel Again" by Isabel van Gelder, Owen Schwartz winning outstanding arrangement for "A Beautiful Dream" by Luke Hemmings, and Keenan Vance winning outstanding soloist for "AMERIICAN REQIUEM" by Beyoncé.

== Members ==
The members of the DJs are selected through a closed audition process. Once a member is selected by the group, the member may choose to accept or decline membership. The term of a member lasts as long as they are a student at the university, or until they leave the group voluntarily.

The group is governed by a constitution, which was drawn up by the founding members. The constitution clearly legislates the processes of leadership within the group, as well as all policies of the group. The constitution spells out the leadership as such:

- Music Director - Runs all rehearsals, makes any decisions regarding the music or repertoire of the group.
- President - Serves as the official representative of the group, resolves any internal disputes.
- Business Manager - manages all public functions of the group, including publicity, concert booking, and financial records.
- Secretary - Maintains attendance records, and sees to other organizational duties when necessary.

Leadership positions are elected by the group at the Annual meeting, at the end of each school year.

== Compilation albums ==
In the world of Collegiate A Cappella, one very common status symbol among groups is to have a track featured on the annual Best of Collegiate A Cappella compilation albums. Dicks and Janes has received three such honors:

- Everything You Want - Featured on BOCA 2002
- Tonight and the Rest of my Life - Featured on BOCA 2003
- Porcelain - featured on BOCA 2004

The group has also had songs featured in the national compilations called "sing" and "Voices Only:"

- Blues in the Night
- If You're Not the One
- Trainwreck (treymix)

== Notable alumni ==
- Kate Reinders, a broadway actress
- Antwaun Stanley, a singer for Vulfpeck
- Ethan Steiner, an actor known for Disney's Newsies

== Albums ==
The Dicks and Janes have recorded four studio albums and one EP:

Album title	Year	Tracks
Show-N-Tell	2002	12
See Dick. See Jane. CD.	2005	11
Acousticophilia	2009	11
Flying Bicycles	2014	8
Futura	2016	4
Momentum	2019	5
Takin' It All	2022	4
Confessions	2024	4

"Show-N-Tell" and "See Dick. See Jane. CD." have both been rated by The Recorded A Cappella Ratings Board.
