= VOG =

Vog or VOG may refer to:

- Vog, air pollution resulting from sulfur dioxide emitted by volcanoes
- Video-oculography, an eye-movement measurement technique
- Voices of Gotham, a choir based in New York City, United States
- Volgograd International Airport, Volgograd, Russia
- VOG-17, VOG-25, VOG-30 ammunition for Soviet and Russian-made grenade launchers
- "Voice of God", industry term for a public address announcer
