= The Kwartet =

American a cappella group

- Origin: Tabernacle, New Jersey, United States
- Genres: A Capella, Jazz, Barbershop Quartet
- Years active: 2009–present
- Labels: Lokananta (with Bubi Chen); Self-Released

The Kwartet' is an American a cappella group from Tabernacle, New Jersey. The band consists of members: Menotti Aristone, Jeff Horner, and Nick Rubino, and Billy Ford. Their first EP, Enter the Cactus, was released on July 19, 2011, followed by their first album, Tempura and Kidney Stones, which was released on March 6, 2012. Tempura and Kidney Stones featured the hit single "The Longest Time", a Billy Joel cover. In recent years, the band released another EP Tanzanian Cream on August 19, 2013 prior to their 2013 tour.

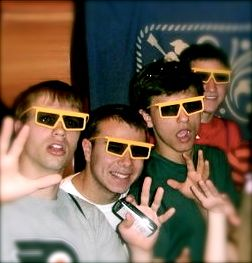
The Kwartet in a 2011 promotional photo, with Dean Rottau still in the band

== History ==
The band formed in 2009, initially under the name "The Kwartet." Two notable differences from the modern-day group were The lineup (Dean Rottau was a member, later replaced by Billy Ford) and their genre- jazz. As the backing band on a rerelease by Bubi Chen, an Indonesian musician, the Kwartet made their label-debut on the Lokananta label. A two-year hiatus put them out of the public spotlight and, despite performing local gigs at local talent shows and karaoke clubs, the band went unbooked for the next two years.

== 2011 tour and changes (2010–2012) ==
The reformed Kwartet re-emerged as The Kinky Kwartet in the late spring of 2011. Replacing Dean Rottau with Billy Ford, modifying their band name, and adopting a new, oldies, a capella repertoire, the band put together an EP of cover songs titled Enter the Cactus, including covers of Wham!'s Wake Me Up Before You Go-Go, The Temptations' My Girl, and The Foundations' Build Me Up Buttercup. While the release generated no buzz in the United States, it shot to the top of the music charts in eastern Africa, including a brief 2-week run at #6 in Djibouti.

During the summer, the band embarked on the tour taking them through three cities in Africa and one show in Eritrea. Although the band temporarily separated when each member went to college, the group reemerged with their first album, Tempura and Kidney Stones, which was released on March 6, 2012. The album is much like their previous release, composed mainly of cover songs. Aside from a performance at Djibouti's Fest'Horn, the group announced other concert dates in Eritrea, Ethiopia, and New Jersey. This album also featured the band's first single, The Longest Time, a cover of the popular Billy Joel song.

== Tanzanian Cream and 2013 tour (2013–present) ==
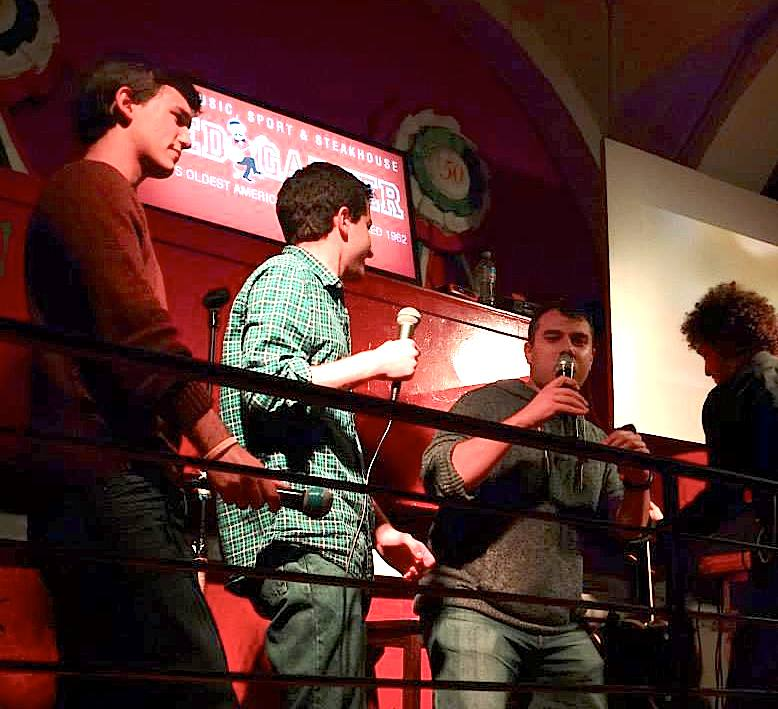
The Kwartet lineup of Dean Rottau, Billy Ford, and Nick Rubino perform live in Florence, Italy in 2013

In 2013, the group emerged from a yearlong hiatus with a new EP entitled, Tanzanian Cream. This album was released under the Lokananta label. Similar to the previous releases, this EP featured a number of a capella covers. However, in a contrast from the typical jazz covers that the band featured in the past, a number of more modern covers such as Some Nights (song) by Fun (band) were included on this album. This album features former front man, Dean Rottau, who was ousted by the band in 2009. Following the release of this EP, the group readopted the name, The Kwartet, and embarked on a 2013 tour. A trip to Florence, Italy found the group reuniting for more studio sessions and a rare, one-off performance (their first in Europe). Currently the band is planning a smaller February tour in smaller Djibouti venues. The February tour is slated to conclude with a show at Stade du Ville in Djibouti City on February 23, 2014. In addition, there are rumors circulating about a second album in the works.

== Personnel ==
The Kwartet personnel
(2009)	(While performing with Bubi Chen.): Jeff Horner – vocals (tenor); Nick Rubino – vocals (bass); Menotti Aristone – vocals (soprano); Dean Rottau – vocals (tenor); Bubi Chen - vocals
(2009-June 2011)	(Original lineup for the Kwartet and Kinky Kwartet.): Jeff Horner – vocals (tenor); Nick Rubino – vocals (bass); Menotti Aristone – vocals (soprano); Dean Rottau – vocals (tenor)
(June 2011-present)	(Lineup recent tours and recording sessions.): Jeff Horner – vocals (tenor); Nick Rubino – vocals (bass); Menotti Aristone – vocals (soprano); Billy Ford – vocals (tenor)

== Discography ==
=== Albums ===
- Tempura and Kidney Stones, 6 March 2012

=== EPs ===
- Enter The Cactus, 19 July 2011
- Tanzanian Cream, 19 August 2013

=== Singles ===
- "The Longest Time" (Billy Joel cover), 17 March 2012

== See also ==
- List of jazz musicians
- List of professional a cappella groups
- Music of Djibouti
