= Bryn Mawr Mainliners =

American a cappella choir

- Also known as: The Mainliners
- Origin: Bryn Mawr, Pennsylvania, US
- Genres: a cappella
- Years active: 1963–present
- Website: www.Mainliners.org

The Bryn Mawr Mainliners is a men's a cappella chorus, based in Bryn Mawr, Pennsylvania. Chartered in 1963 as an official chapter of the Barbershop Harmony Society, the chorus is rich in both history and accomplishment.

== History ==
In 1963, some singers in the Philadelphia suburbs expressed an interest in starting a chorus that would dedicate itself to both musical excellence and community service. After choosing the suburb of Bryn Mawr as their initial location, the men incorporated as a chapter of the Barbershop Harmony Society. The Bryn Mawr Mainliners chapter competes in the Atlantic Division of the Mid-Atlantic District of the Barbershop Harmony Society.

The Mainliners competed regularly and first won the Mid-Atlantic District championship in 1990 under the direction of Eric Jackson, earning the privilege of representing the district at the International contest the following summer in Louisville, Kentucky. In July 1991, in their first International contest appearance, the Mainliners earned a 6th-place finish.

After their first victory in 1991, the Mainliners again won the District Championship in 1991 and attended the International contest in 1992 in New Orleans under the direction of Bill Oppenheim placing 19th. The Mainliners again represented the Mid-Atlantic District on the International stage in 1997 in Indianapolis and placed 16th under the direction of Rick Serpico.

History of Directors
Years	Name	Tenure
1963–1967	Hank Calhoun	5 years
1968–1975	Tom Ewald	8 years
1976–1976	Bill Oppenheim	1 year
1977–1982	Ron Knickerbocker	6 years
1983–1988	Eric Jackson	6 years
1992–1993	Bill Oppenheim	5 years
1993–1997	Rick Serpico	5 years
1999–2000	Kirk Roose	2 years
2000–2002	Eric Jackson	3 years
2003–2023	Rick Serpico	20 years
2024–present	Timar Quinn Shevlin	1+ years

== Awards and recognition ==
- Mid-Atlantic District (BHS) Champions in 1991 and 1997
- Qualified to Compete in the International Chorus Competition 4 times
- Atlantic Division Champions 14 times

== Discography ==
- Mainliners On Track! (1999)
- Harmony for the Holidays (1998)

== See also ==
- Barbershop Harmony Society
- Mid-Atlantic District (BHS)
- Barbershop music
- Barbershop Arrangements
- Singing Valentines
- A cappella music
