= Brothers in Harmony =

American a cappella chorus

- Origin: Easton, Pennsylvania United States
- Genres: Barbershop, Choral
- Years active: 1998–present
- Members: Music Director: Jack Pinto, President: Larry Melton
- Website: www.brothersinharmony.org

The Brothers in Harmony (BIH) was a 100-plus member American a cappella chorus based in Hamilton, New Jersey, under the direction of Jack Pinto. The award-winning chorus was part of Mid-Atlantic District of the Barbershop Harmony Society. The Brothers in Harmony were the 1999 Mid-Atlantic Champions and 1999 M-AD Representatives to the International Competition; 2000, 2001, 2002, 2003, and 2004 M-AD Intermediate Chorus Champions; 2007 and 2008 International Finalists; and 2010 International 9th place Finalists. In 2013 they came in 6th place at the Toronto International Convention. In 2015 they placed 8th at the Pittsburgh International Convention behind the champion Westminster Chorus and other Mid-Atlantic District choruses, The Alexandria Harmonizers and the Voices Of Gotham. Brothers in Harmony later moved to Hunterdon County, New Jersey, and became the Evolution in Harmony chorus.

== History ==
The Brothers in Harmony were started in 1998 as the Easton, Pennsylvania chapter. In July 1999 the chorus, which was only 18 months old, represented the Mid-Atlantic District at the International Contest in Anaheim, California. They relocated to Hamilton Square, New Jersey, in 2008.

In August 2005, the Brothers in Harmony, at the invitation of the Russian Minister of Culture, performed at the International Music Festival in St. Petersburg, Russia.

The Brothers in Harmony later joined the Hunterdon Harmony Alliance (Hunterdon County, New Jersey chapter), and formed the Evolution in Harmony chorus.

== See also ==
- Old School (quartet)
- list of professional a cappella groups
- Barbershop music
