= The Essentials (band) =

Canadian a cappella group

- The Essentials' (left to right): Dan Speck, Janet Turner, Thom Speck, Joe Oliva

Background information
- Origin: London, Ontario; Toronto, Ontario, Canada
- Genres: A Cappella; Pop
- Occupations: Singers musicians
- Instrument: Vocals
- Years active: 1993–2011
- Members: Joe Oliva (1993–2011); Dan Speck (1996–2011); Thom Speck (2005–2011); Janet Turner (2009–2011)
- Past members: Mike Ferfolia; Jimmy Koumanis; Joon Nah; Phil Papadopoulos; Rob Sylvester; Bob Van Gieson
- Website: Essentialsmusic.com

The Essentials was a Canadian a cappella group founded in London, Ontario, Canada in 1993, that were based out of Toronto from 2000 onward. Band co-founders Joon Nah and Joe Oliva attended London Central Secondary School where they co-founded a predecessor a cappella group to the Essentials, called the Humdingers.

== Biography ==
The Essentials' first gig was singing a cappella doo-wop songs, weekly during the summer months, in the parking lot of an ice cream parlor called Merla-Mae Ice Cream in London, Ontario.

In 1996, Dan Speck joined the band. Speck had been introduced to the band through the Essentials' then-manager Terry McManus via Emm Gryner. Dan Speck's younger brother Thom, formerly of Streetnix, then joined the band in 2005. Both Speck brothers and Gryner have known each other since their youth in the small town of Forest, Ontario. Janet Turner completed the quartet in 2009.

Since their inception, the Essentials have focused mostly on performances in Canada and the United States, but have also ventured into Europe. They have performed thousands of shows including the national anthems for the Toronto Blue Jays, Toronto Raptors and Toronto Maple Leafs which has garnered them more national television exposure in Canada.

They also appeared in nationally televised ads for Bell ExpressVu in Canada.

In 1999, the Essentials played a singing and speaking role in a CBS movie entitled A Holiday Romance along with Paula MacNeill (who would later become a part of the house band on the U.S. nationally televised game show The Singing Bee). The movie stars Andy Griffith, Naomi Judd and Gerald McRaney.

Their first two albums, Oh What A Night! and ...And Then Some were produced by highly regarded record producer Jack Richardson, and their 2007 Christmas recording was certified gold in December of that year.

The Essentials' latest release, Nothing But Blue, was produced by Darryl Neudorf, charted nationally in Canada, and tied Eminem for No. 1 on the Toronto charts for the week ending 9 September 2010. Since its release in June 2010, Nothing But Blue received positive reviews in regional newspapers as well as by Canada's highest-circulation newspaper The Toronto Star, which gave the album 3.5 stars out of 4.

Once in 2008, and again in 2010, the Essentials have made special event "one-time only" return performances to the parking lot of the Merla-Mae Ice Cream parlour where they had not performed since 1996. In 2010, the ice cream parlor added individual sundaes to their menu in honor of the current band line-up as well as former member Nah.

On 23 December 2011, the Essentials sang their final notes together in Toronto.

== Discography ==
- Oh What A Night! (1994)
- ...And Then Some (1996)
- Bare (2000, live)
- Stocking Stuffer (2007, certified gold)
- Remember December (2008, a Christmas album)
- Nothing But Blue (2010)

=== Compilations ===
- When The Lights Come On at Christmas (1997), charity compilation for Jesse's Journey in support of Duchenne muscular dystrophy, includes a contribution from Beverley Mahood
- Scenes From A Dream (2000), the Timmins Concert Singers produced this recording, includes a contribution from Patricia O'Callaghan
- Come Together: An A Cappella Tribute to the Beatles (2001), includes a contribution from another Canadian a cappella group, The Nylons
- Sing 7 – Lucky (2010), seventh annual compilation by the Contemporary A Cappella Society
