= Mid-Atlantic District (BHS) =

District of the Barbershop Harmony Society

The Mid-Atlantic District is one of 17 districts of the Barbershop Harmony Society (BHS).

The district, with three regional divisions, has approximately 70 chapters across Virginia, Maryland, Pennsylvania, New Jersey, Delaware, West Virginia, New York, and Washington, D.C.

The BHS District Map. The Dixie District has since renamed to Southeastern Harmony and the Carolinas separated to their own district.

== Notable choruses ==
=== Delaware ===
- First State Harmonizers; Milford, DE

=== Maryland ===
- Chorus of the Chesapeake – Dundalk, MD (2-time International Champions – 1961, 1971)
- Harmony Express Men's Chorus – Germantown, MD
- Pride of DelMarVa – Queen Anne's County, MD
- Sons of the Severn – Annapolis, MD

=== New Jersey ===
- Brothers in Harmony – Hamilton Square, NJ (2013 6th place International Finalists)
- East Coast Sound – West Caldwell, NJ
- The Pine Barons Chorus – Cherry Hill, NJ (1981 5th place International, Detroit)

=== New York ===
- Big Apple Chorus – Manhattan, New York, NY
- Voices of Gotham – Hell's Kitchen, NY (2012 District Champions)
- Westchester Chordsmen – White Plains, NY

=== Pennsylvania ===
- Bryn Mawr Mainliners – Bryn Mawr, PA (2-time District Champions 1991 and 1997)
- Keystone Capital Chorus – Harrisburg, PA
- Parkside Harmony – Hershey, PA
- Red Rose Chorus – Lancaster, PA
- The North Pennsmen – Lansdale, PA
- The Bucks County Country Gentlemen – Bucks County, PA
- White Rose Chorus – York, PA

=== Virginia ===
- Alexandria Harmonizers – Alexandria, VA (4-time International Champions – 1986, 1989, 1995, 1998)
- Virginians – Richmond, VA
- The Commodore Chorus; Norfolk, VA

=== Washington, D.C. ===
- Singing Capital Chorus – Washington, D.C.

=== West Virginia ===
- The Blue and Grey Chorus; Inwood, WV

== Notable quartets ==
- Oriole Four

== See also ==
- Barbershop music
- Barbershop arrangements
- A cappella music
- American Harmony Documentary Film about Barbershop music
