= White Rose Chorus =

Barbershop chorus based in York, Pennsylvania, U.S.

- Choir
- Banner for the White Rose Chorus, Barbershop Harmony Society
- Former name: Colonial Chorus (1966–1986)
- Origin: York, Pennsylvania, U.S.
- Founded: 1945 (81 years ago)
- Genre: Barbershop, choral
- President: David Kelly
- Music director: Bob Crist III
- Affiliation: Barbershop Harmony Society
- Website: whiterosechorus.com

The White Rose Chorus is the York, Pennsylvania, chapter of the Barbershop Harmony Society, under the direction of Bob Crist III. It was the second society chapter to be chartered in Pennsylvania (1946), and the first in its district to surpass 100 active members. In 2018, the White Rose Chorus was ranked "Most Improved" among eight competing choruses in its division, and the best in its plateau level.

== History ==
The York, Pennsylvania, chapter of the Barbershop Harmony Society (at that time SPEBSQSA, Inc.), was founded in 1945 and sponsored by the Wilmington, Delaware, chapter. The chapter was chartered by the society in 1946 and incorporated in the State of Pennsylvania in 1949. The group was simply known as the York Chapter and the charter president was Harry M. Steinhauser. The York chapter was the second in Pennsylvania to receive a charter and soon sponsored other area chapters including those in Harrisburg, Lancaster, Hanover and Lebanon.

The chapter was at one point inactive in the 1960s. It resumed activity in 1966 and became known as the Colonial Chorus. The chapter bylaws were amended by then president Donald Slonicker, who as of 2021 is still a member of the chapter. The York chapter was the first in the Mid-Atlantic District to surpass 100 active members, and was a division championship-level chorus during the 1980s under the direction of Carl Snyder. The group became known as the White Rose Chorus in 1986 and continued to compete at the division level through 2005.

Membership declined considerably and by 2008 had dwindled to eight active members. It was commonly thought throughout the barbershop community that the York chapter had folded, but that small core of remaining members continued to rehearse and perform under the direction of Bruce Van Order.

In 2014, the chapter returned to the division contest, for the first time since 2005, at the Western Division convention in Harrisburg, Pennsylvania. In 2018, the chapter won at the "A" Plateau, and "Most Improved Chorus" overall, in the Central Division Chorus Contest in Alexandria, Virginia. The chorus has advanced to the "AA" plateau for the first time since the plateau system was established in 2007.

== Musical directors ==
- Bob Crist III (2015–present)

Former directors: Harry Steinhauser, Carl Snyder, Bruce Van Order, Eric Phillips
