= Songwriters Association of Canada =

- Formation: 1983
- Type: Songwriting
- Legal status: active
- Headquarters: Toronto, Ontario
- Region served: Canada
- Official language: English
- Staff: 4
- Website: songwriters.ca

The Songwriters Association of Canada (SAC) is a Canadian organization dedicated exclusively to Canadian composers, lyricists and songwriters. Their mission is to develop and protect the creative and business environments for songwriters in Canada and around the world.

== Origins ==
In 1983, a group of songwriters came together in Toronto to create an industry presence for Canadian songwriters. Originally named the "Canadian Songwriters Association", the primary objectives were to give a voice to lyricists and composers within Canada's music and broadcasting industries, and to provide input into the copyright reforms that were happening at the time in Ottawa. As part of this broader initiative, the association was part of the larger Music Copyright Action Group (MCAG), formed as a lobby group to influence positive changes in the federal Copyright Act. The founding board of directors and first executive consisted of Terry McManus (president), Gregory Marshall (vice-president), and other Canadian songwriters, including Eddie Schwartz, Rich Dodson, composer/arranger Maribeth Solomon, and lawyer/lyricist Stephen Stohn - plus executive director Donna Murphy. An honorary board was assembled that included Paul Anka, Geddy Lee, Tom Cochrane and Robbie Robertson. At this time, a name change to the "Songwriters Association of Canada" or "S.A.C" accompanied a widened mandate that included songwriter development through workshops and the opportunity to allow budding songwriters to have their work reviewed and assessed by seasoned industry professionals.

== Proposal to monetize file sharing ==
The SAC made news in late 2007 when they released a proposal to monetize file sharing in Canada by setting up a collection agency to distribute royalties to artists and songwriters (much like what is done on the radio). Similar ideas had been proposed in the past by the Electronic Frontier Foundation and William Fischer, but the SAC was one of the largest organizations and one of the first artist organizations to get serious about the idea. The Canadian Record Industry Association called it a "pipe dream" at first, but in 2008 the record industry shifted its strategy to push for largely the same idea that the SAC had proposed. The Canadian Music Creators Coalition, on the other hand, called the proposal "forward thinking." The proposal received much criticism from technology experts as a "music tax," since it calls for a mandatory license for everyone connected to the Internet, rather than an opt-in voluntary system.
