= Blackville, New Brunswick =

Blackville
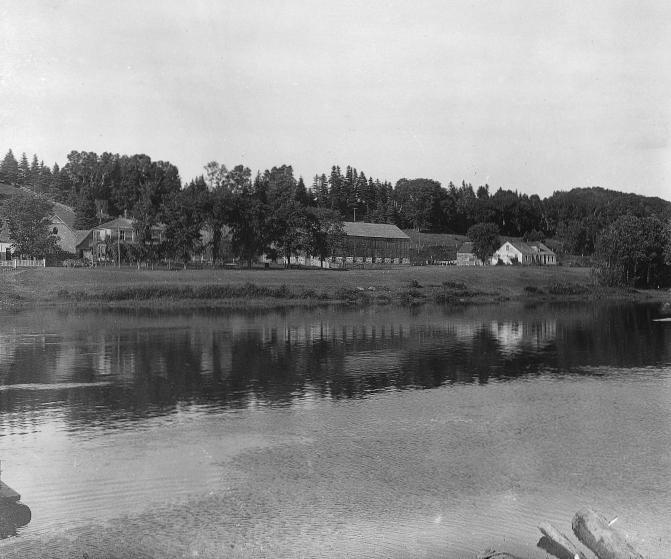

- Location within New Brunswick
- Coordinates: 46°44′06″N 65°49′45″W
- Country: Canada
- Province: New Brunswick
- County: Northumberland
- Parish: Blackville
- Municipality: Miramichi River Valley
- Incorporated: 1967
- Amalgamated: 2023

Government
  - Type: Mayor and Council of Miramichi River Valley Rural Community

Area
  - Total: 20.97 km^{2} (8.10 sq mi)

Population (2021)
  - Total: 914
  - Density: 43.6/km^{2} (113/sq mi)
  - Change 2016–21: ▼4.6%
- Time zone: UTC-4 (EST)
  - Summer (DST): UTC-3 (EDT)
- Website: www.villageofblackville.com

Blackville is a former village in Northumberland County, New Brunswick, Canada. It is now part of the rural community of Miramichi River Valley.

It is located on the Southwest Miramichi River approximately 40 km (25 mi) southwest of Miramichi.

== History ==
The first post office opened in the area in 1842, under the community name "Decantillon's"; the area known as The Forks was also serviced by this post office. In 1847, these areas collectively became known as Blackville, as the area was the largest population centre in the Parish of Blackville. The parish, created in 1830 when it was partitioned from the Parish of Ludlow, had been named in honour of William Black, the acting governor of the colony of New Brunswick from 1829 to 1831.

Blackville was first incorporated as a village in 1967, annexing the neighbouring communities of Underhill and Breadalbane later that year.

On January 1, 2023, Blackville amalgamated with all or part of eight local service districts to form the new incorporated rural community of Miramichi River Valley. Blackville remains in official use.

== Demographics ==
In the 2021 Census of Population conducted by Statistics Canada, Blackville had a population of 914 living in 394 of its 446 total private dwellings, a change of −4.6% from its 2016 population of 958. With a land area of 20.97 km^{2} (8.10 sq mi), it had a population density of 43.6/km^{2} (112.9/sq mi) in 2021.

Historical population
| Year | Pop. | ±% |
|---|---|---|
| 1871 | 450 | — |
| 1898 | 600 | +33.3% |
| 1981 | 892 | +48.7% |
| 1986 | 903 | +1.2% |
| 1991 | 938 | +3.9% |
| 1996 | 957 | +2.0% |
| 2001 | 1,015 | +6.1% |
| 2006 | 931 | −8.3% |
| 2011 | 990 | +6.3% |
| 2016 | 958 | −3.2% |
| 2021 | 914 | −4.6% |

== Government ==
Blackville residents are able to cast votes in the Miramichi River Valley Rural Community's elections for mayor, three at-large councillors, and the Ward 3 councillor. The community is within the federal electoral district of Miramichi-Grand Lake, and within the provincial electoral district of Southwest Miramichi-Bay du Vin.

The mayors of Blackville during its time as an incorporated village from 1967 to 2022 included:

1. Lawrence Stephens (1967–1969)
2. Harold Connors (1969–1971)
3. Roland Walls (1971–1992)
4. Glen Hollowood (1992–1998)
5. Roland Walls (1998–2001)
6. Omer MacKenzie (2001–2004)
7. Glen Hollowood (2004–2012)
8. Harold Muck (2012–2013)
9. Matthew Sturgeon (2013)
10. Andrew Hawkes (2013–2016)
11. Christopher Hennessy (2016–2021)
12. Ian Fortune (2021–2022)

== Economy ==
Blackville's economy was once tied to the forest industry. A large sawmill that employed 200 workers had been operated in the village by industrial conglomerate UPM Kymmene, but it closed in 2007 as a result of economic pressures.

According to the 2016 Census, Blackville citizens had a median income of $30,816 for individuals, and $62,976 for households in 2015. Blackville's unemployment rate was 21.9%.

Blackville is home to a single financial institution, Blackville Credit Union, founded in 1936. It is the oldest of its kind in New Brunswick.

Near the end of the twentieth century, the 1842 Old Trinity Anglican Church in Blackville was deconsecrated and sold, then removed from the community. It eventually found a new home as an artist's studio in Oklahoma City, Oklahoma.

== Education ==
Blackville School, grades K–12, is a public school in the community. This is the only grade school in Blackville, with students occasionally transporting to other Miramichi schools instead (Such as Miramichi Valley High School).

== Notable people ==
- Herb Curtis
- J. F. A. McManus
- Kathy McCormack
- Marion Leane Smith (Lived her final years and died in Blackville.)

== See also ==
- List of communities in New Brunswick
