= JoJo Worthington =

Canadian musician (born 1994)

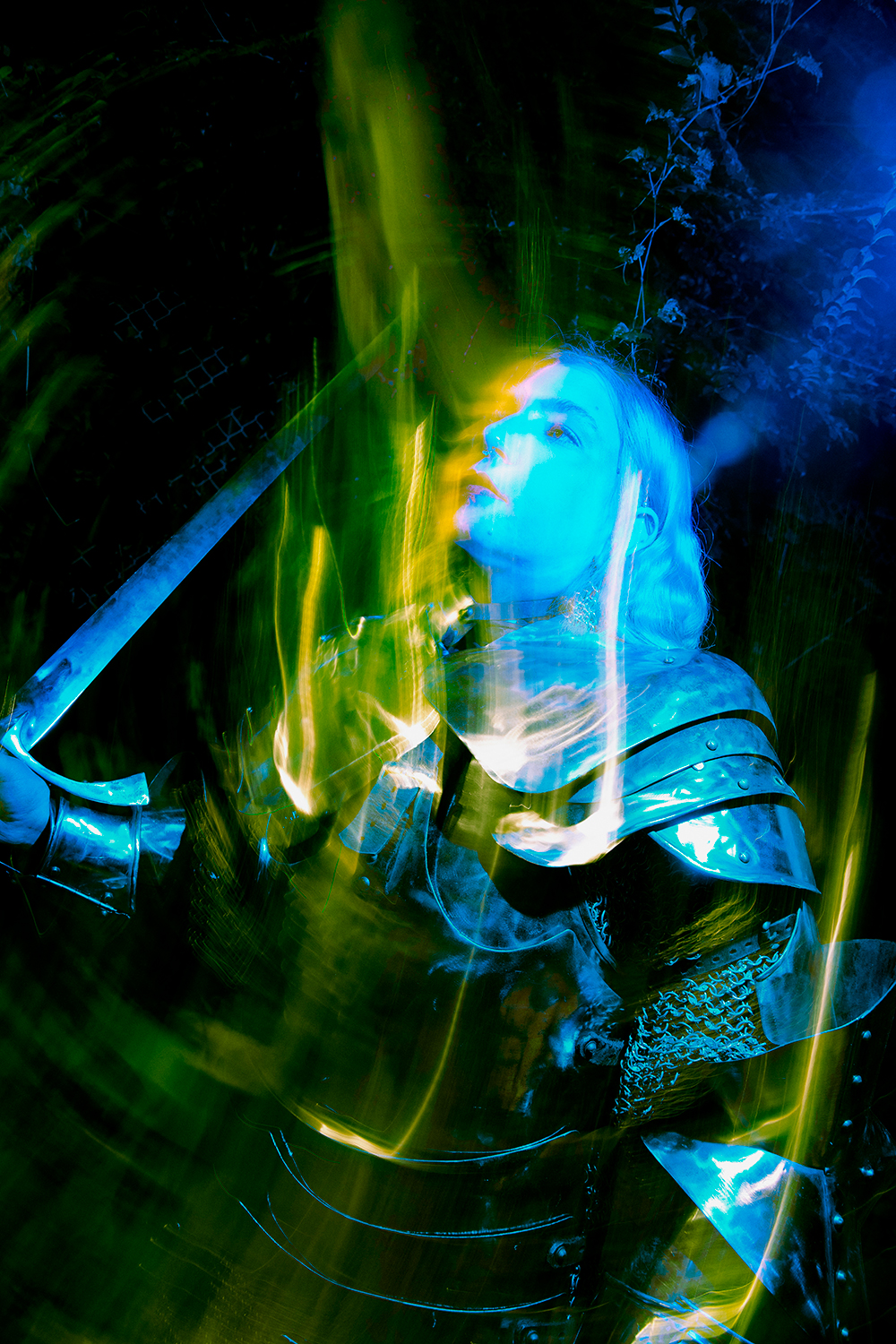
- Worthington in 2022

Background information
- Born: Joanna Worthington; November 7, 1994 (age 31)
- Genres: Experimental folk, ambient, electroacoustic
- Instruments: Ukulele, Guitar, Synthesizers, Vocals, Piano, Samplers
- Website: www.jojoworthington.com

Joanna Worthington (born November 7, 1994) is a Canadian multi-instrumentalist, composer, songwriter, producer, and avant-folk musician from Kitchener-Waterloo, Ontario.

Alongside her experimental use of the ukulele, Worthington has been noted for her extensive use of live looping and effects. In 2015, she was the Grand Prize winner in the Songwriters Hall of Fame Songwriting Competition, and has won awards in every year since for her work. Her song 'Amadeus' has been featured in Degrassi: Next Class.

Her music has been described as "explored and articulated through experimental sounds, loops and brash orchestral flashes". It has also been described as “infinite”. This Canadian producer / songwriter / composer crafts experimental post-folk in which intimate recollections explode into limitless soundscapes. Fusing electronic glitches, acoustic nuances, and extraterrestrial melodies, Worthington's work pushes emotionally potent folk songs to the perilous edge.

== Discography ==
- BAPTIZED I
  - Format: Digital
  - Released: 2022
  - Label: N/A
- The Company You Keep (stylized as TCYK)
  - Format: LP Digital
  - Released: 2019
  - Label: N/A
- // (pronounced Two Lines)
  - Released: 2016
  - Format: CD, Cassette, Digital
  - Label: Epoch Tapes
- 7
  - Released: 2014
  - Format: CD, Digital
  - Label: N/A
