= Marion Leane Smith =

Australian Canadian nurse (1891–1957)

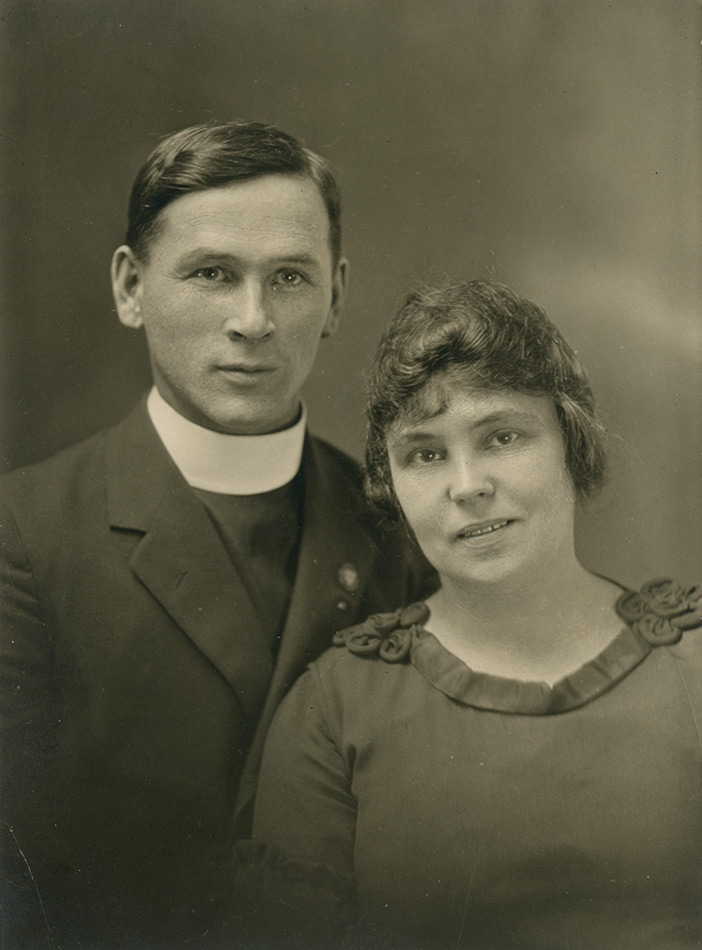
- Born: Marion Elizabeth Smith; 1891; Liverpool, New South Wales, Australia
- Died: 24 January 1957 (aged 65–66); Blackville, New Brunswick, Canada
- Other name: Marion Walls
- Military career
- Allegiance: United Kingdom
- Branch: Queen Alexandra's Imperial Military Nursing Service
- Service years: 1917–1919
- Rank: Sister
- Conflicts: First World War: Western Front; Italian Front

Marion Leane Walls (née Smith; 1891 – 24 January 1957) was an Australian-Canadian nurse. She is the only Aboriginal Australian woman known to have served in the First World War. Smith was of English and Darug descent; her grandmother, Lucy Leane, belonged to the Cabrogal people.

== Early years ==
Smith was born in Liverpool, New South Wales, to Elizabeth and George William Smith in 1891. Smith's grandmother petitioned the NSW Aborigines Protection Board for a fishing boat in 1893. Smith moved with her family to Canada at a young age.

== Nursing career ==
Smith underwent nursing training at the New England Hospital in Massachusetts, before returning to Canada in 1913 to join the Victorian Order of Nurses in Montreal. She enlisted with Queen Alexandra's Imperial Military Nursing Service in 1917. At the time, it was difficult for Australian Aboriginal women to access the needed training to enlist, and so no nurses of Aboriginal heritage were known to have served in the Australian forces.

Smith served with No. 41 Ambulance Train in France. The ambulance trains were designated to transport injured soldiers from the front lines to military hospitals, and were known to be difficult environments in which to work. Nevertheless, Smith distinguished herself; her supervisor noted that "Her work is both quickly and efficiently done. She is most capable in every way". After the conclusion of her ambulance train contract, Smith went first to Italy with the Italian Expeditionary Force and then to the University War Hospital in Southampton, United Kingdom.

Smith returned to Canada in 1919 and married veteran Victor Walls. The couple moved to Trinidad, where Walls served as headmaster of Naparima College; Smith wrote the school's hymn and created its dormitory infirmary. At the outbreak of the Second World War, Smith served as commandant for the first iteration of the Red Cross on the island, as well as leading a Nurses' Council; for her service she was later awarded a Distinguished War Service Medal. They returned to Canada in 1953. Smith and Walls had one son, born during their time in Trinidad. Smith died in Blackville, New Brunswick, on 24 January 1957.
