= Slixs =

Male classical vocal ensemble based in Munich

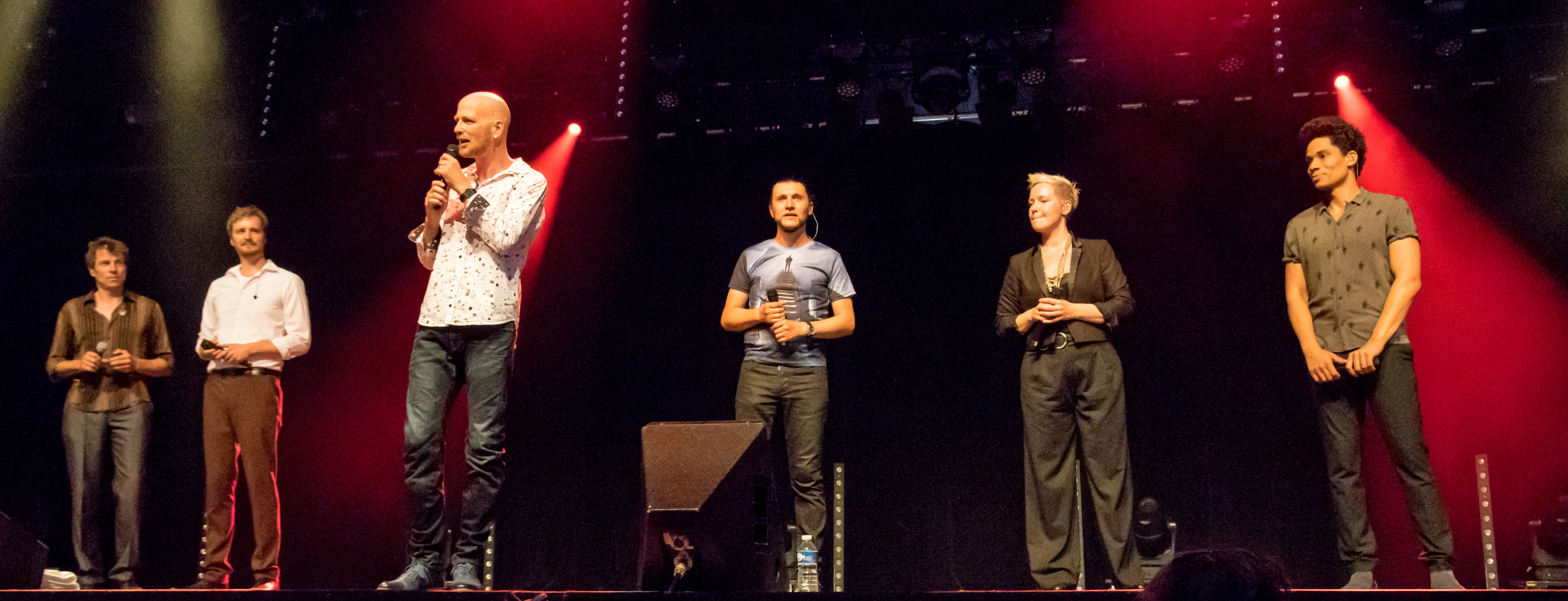
- Slixs at the ZMF, 2017

Background information
- Origin: Essen; Dresden; Leipzig; Halle
- Genres: a cappella music
- Years active: 1990s – present
- Website: www.slixs.info

Slixs (styled SLIXS) is a German a cappella sextet with members from Essen, Dresden, Leipzig and Halle. When the formed a group around 1996, they called it Stouxingers. The present formation of Katharina Debus, Michael Eimann, Gregorio D’Clouet Hernández, Karsten Müller, Thomas Piontek and Konrad Zeiner sing together since 2006. They adopted the name Slixs in 2012. They sing in many styles inspired by jazz, pop music and rhythm and blues, including adaptations of classical compositions and world music.

== History ==
A group of singers named Stouxingers formed ain the late 1990s and were initially sometimes accompanied by instruments. They made a first album, Voice on the Trigger, in 1998. They began to perform strictly in 2003. They recorded two more albums, Everything Ain’t Everything … in 2004 and … Nothing Is Real in 2008.

They developed a scenic form of performance with the director Frieder Venus in 2010, Vocal Virus, including collagues of sound and body percussion. The program was recorded for DVD.

The group used the name Slixs from February 2012, recording an EP of the same name. The participated in the soundtrack of the 2009 film Mensch Kotschie by Norbert Baumgarten, leading to a 2014 EP Quer Bach based on compositions by J. S. Bach and a 2016 program. in 2018 they took part in the play Time to close your eyes at the Schauspiel Bochum directed by Olaf Kröck.

The group has performed in Germany and also many European countries, Russia, Israel, Taiwan, Singapore, China, South Korea, Malaysia and Brunei. Venues in Germany included the Gewandhaus in Leipzig, Schlachthof in Munich, Radialsystem in Berlin and the Bonn Pantheon.

They appeared at festivals including the Montreux Jazz Festival, Deutsches Chorfest in Stuttgart and Leipzig, Ruhrfestspiele, Solidarity Of Arts Festival in Poland, and Red Sea Jazz Festival in Israel.

== Singers ==
The ensemble performs as a sextet:

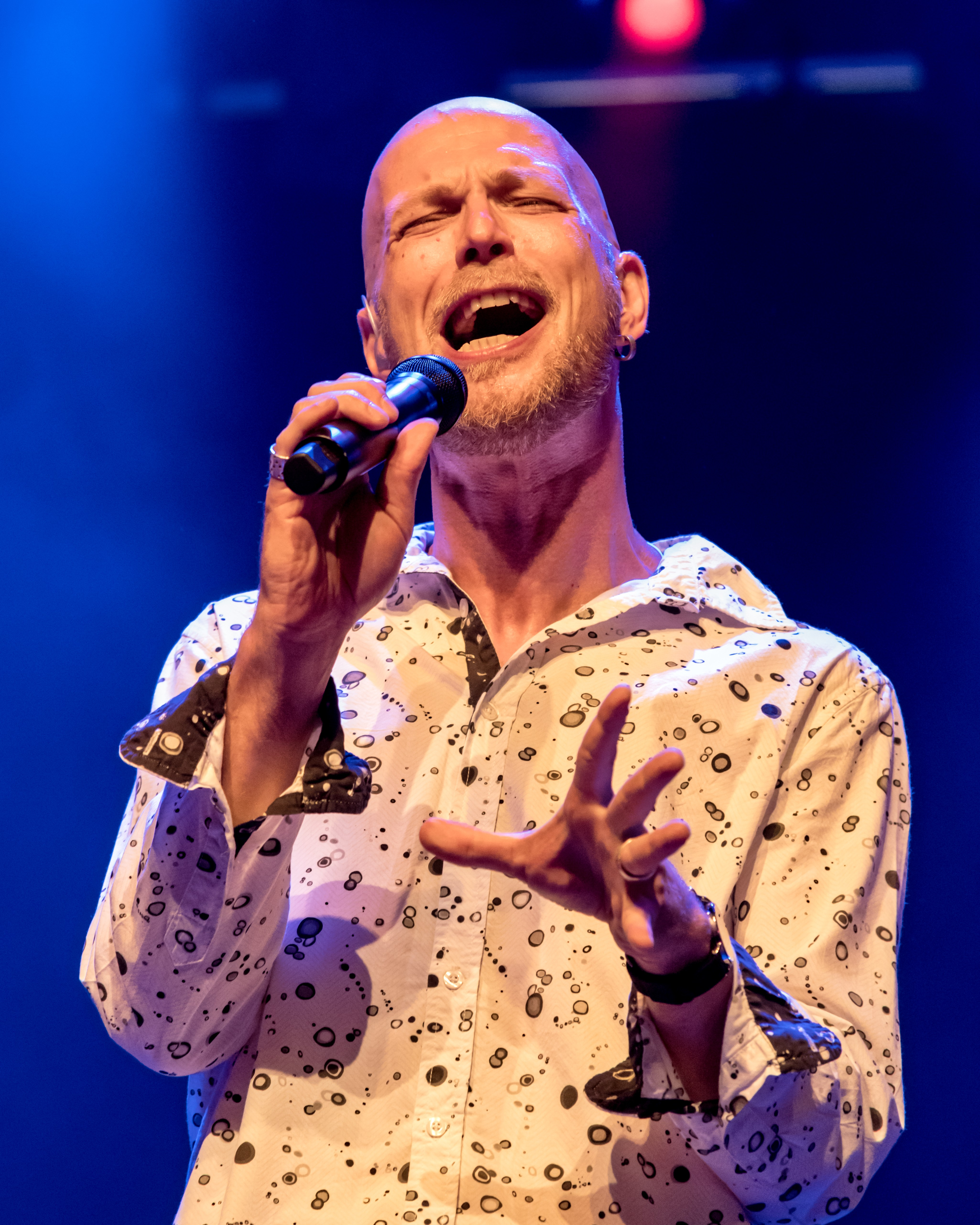
Michael Eimann

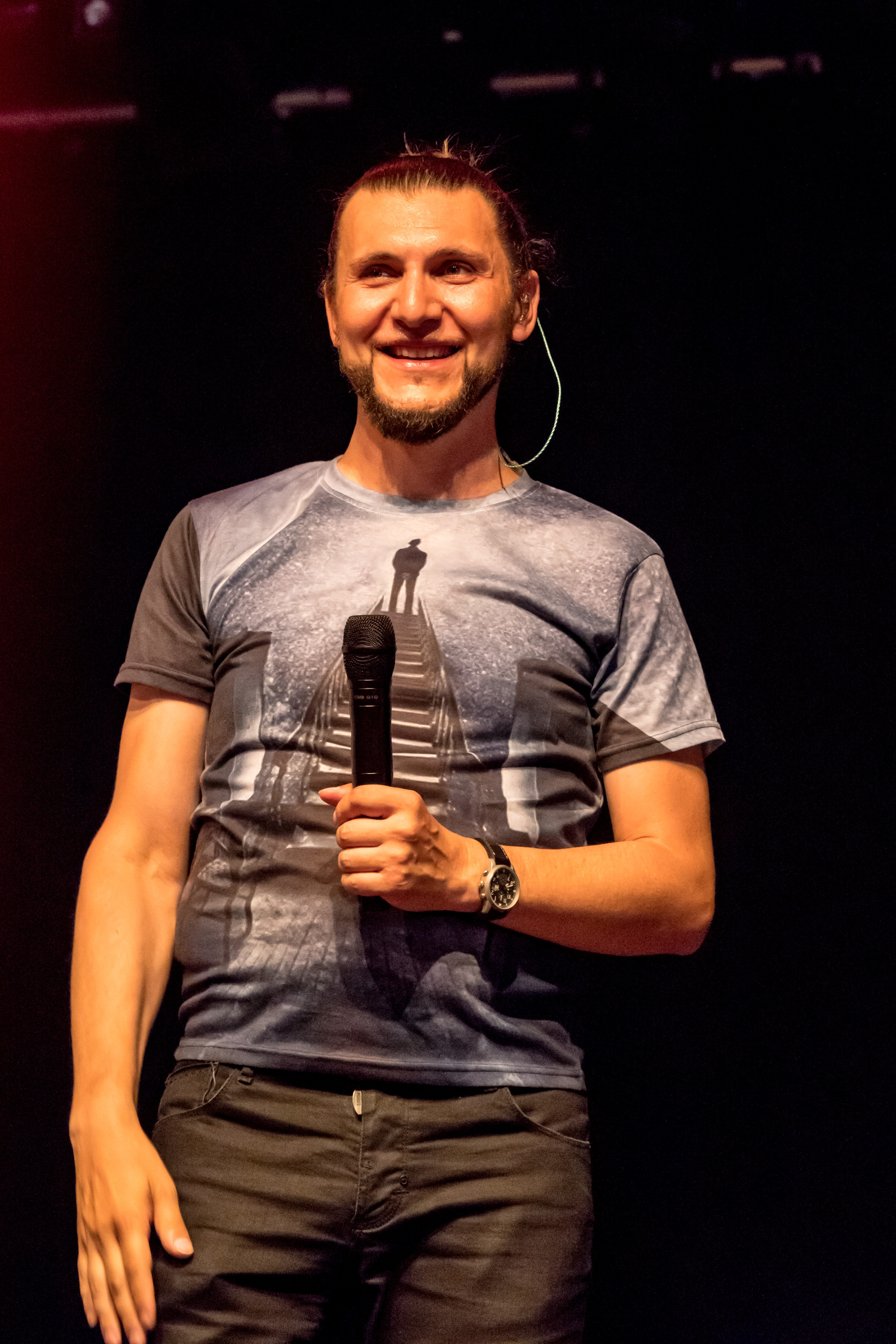
Konrad Zeiner

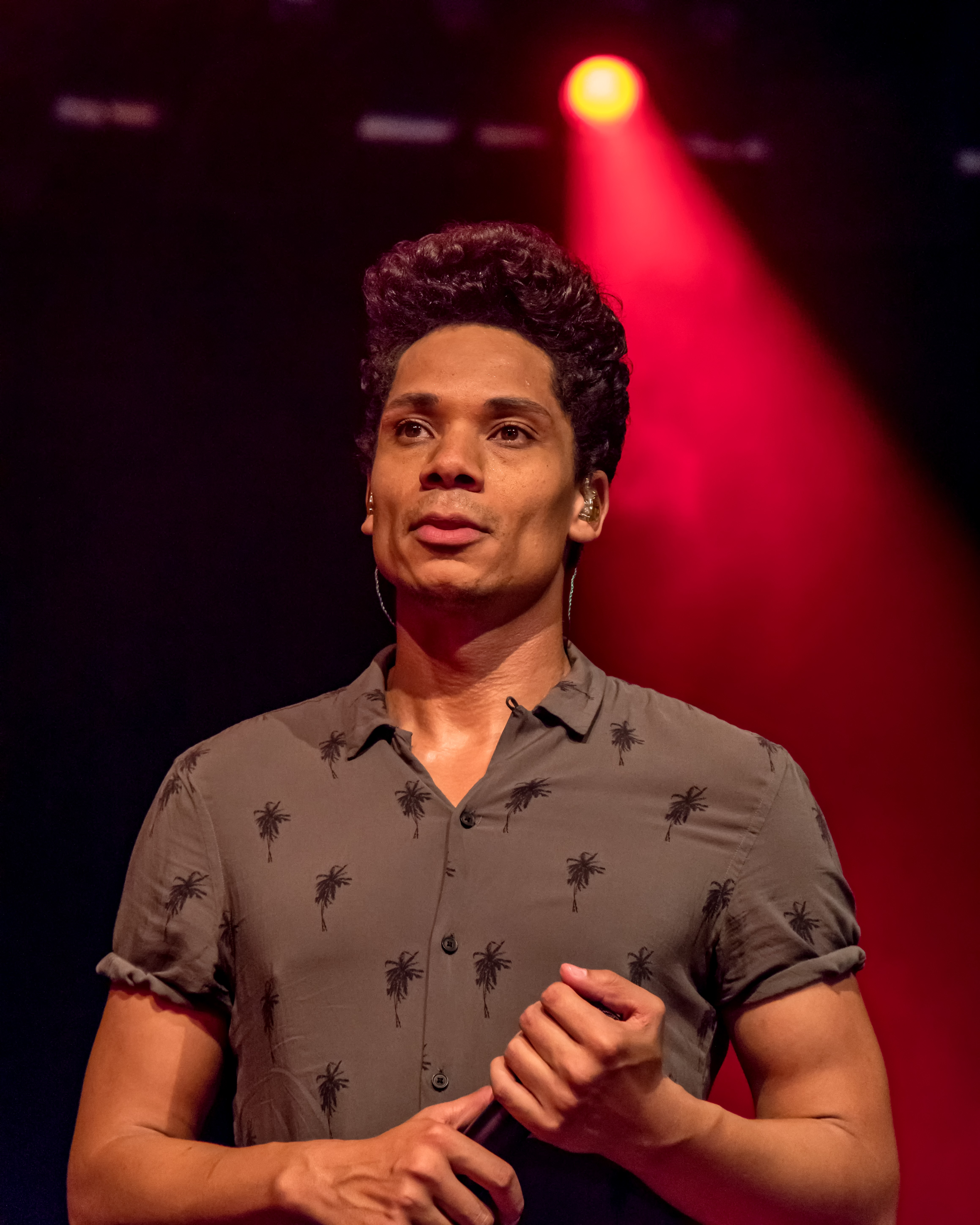
Gregorio D’Clouet Hernández

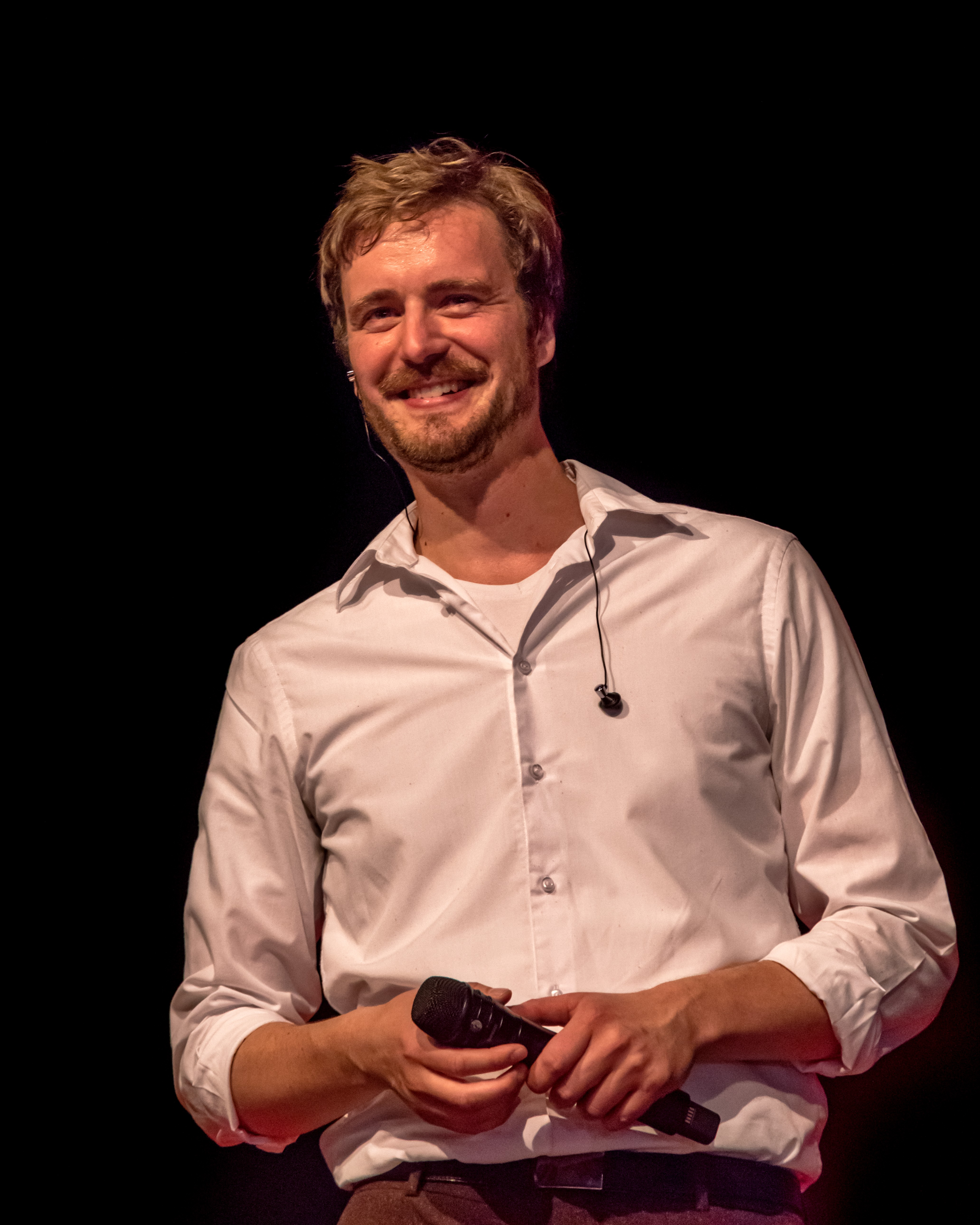
Karsten Müller

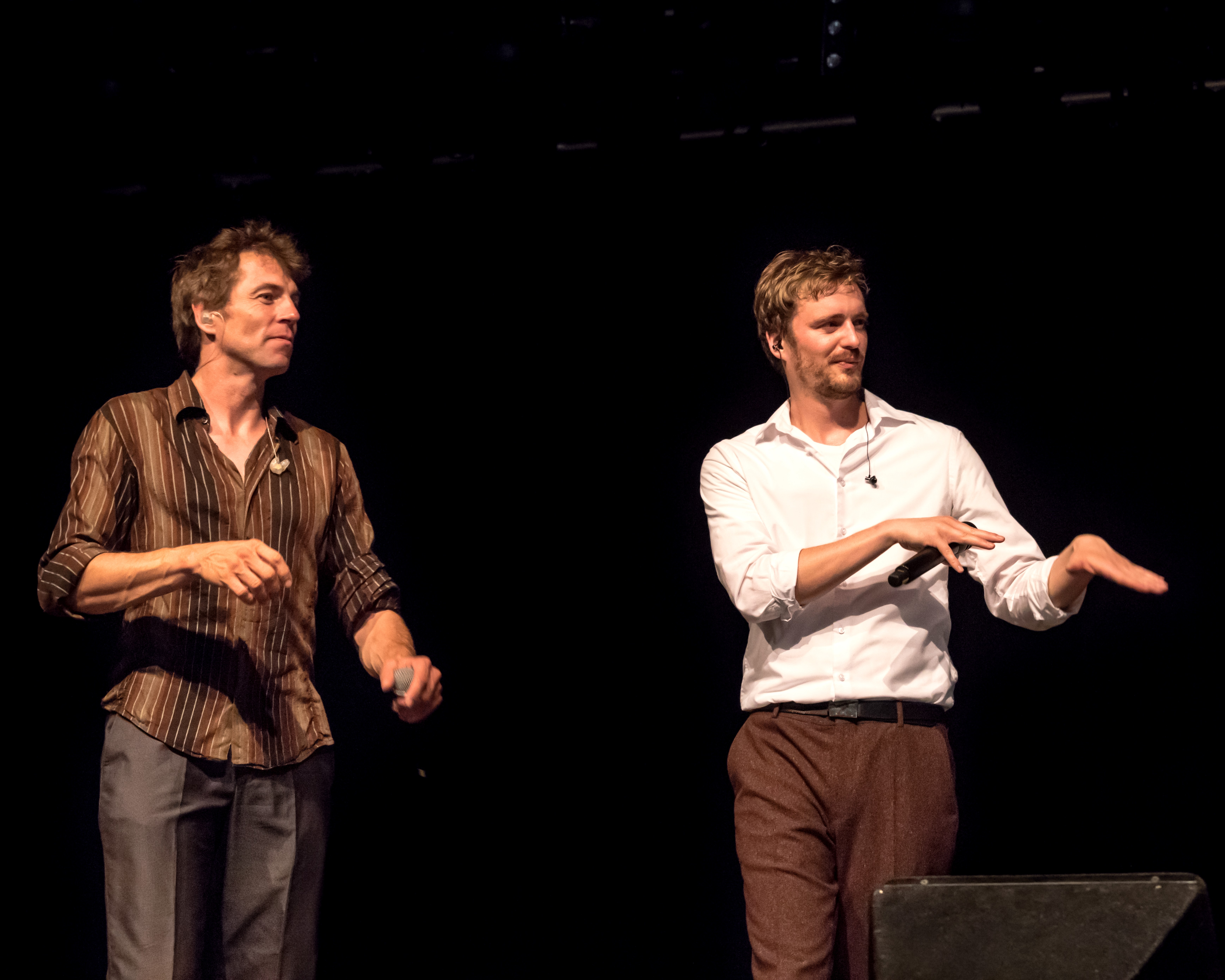
Thomas Piontek und Karsten Müller

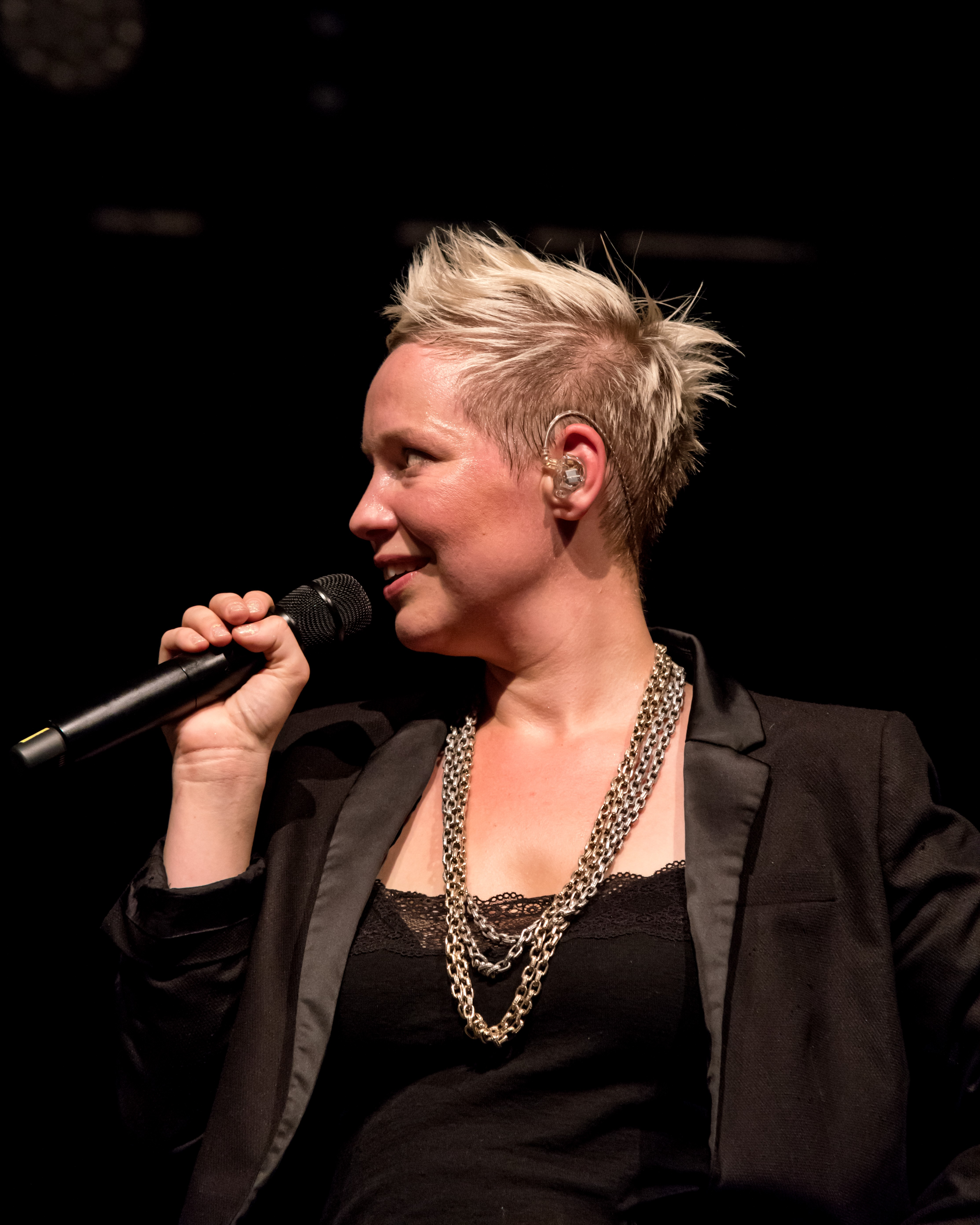
Katharina Debus

== Recordings ==
Studio albums

- 1998: Voice on the Trigger (Metrix / Bogner Records)
- 2004: Everything Ain’t Everything … (241 Music Record / Fone 520)
- 2008: … Nothing Is Real (241 Music Record / Fone 520)
- 2012: SLIXS (Klangraum Records)
- 2014: Quer Bach (Klangraum Records)
- 2016: Playgrounds (Herzog Records)
- 2018: Quer Bach 2 (Hey!Classics)
- 2022: Quer Bach 3 (Hey!Classics)
