= Six Appeal =

American a cappella group

- Also known as: Six Appeal Vocal Band
- Origin: Moorhead, Minnesota, United States
- Genres: A Cappella
- Years active: 2006–present
- Labels: Independent
- Members: Andrew "Berko" Berkowitz; Michael Brookens; Virginia Cavaliere; Mel Daneke; Jeff Gavin; Jordan Roll
- Website: Official Website

Six Appeal is a professional six-part a cappella group from Minneapolis, Minnesota. Six Appeal tours nationally in the United States, and performs around 150 shows a year.

== History ==
The group Six Appeal was founded in the fall of 2006 at Concordia College in Moorhead, Minnesota, by Michael Brookens and Jordan Roll. Originally a college hobby, performing at numerous campus events at Concordia. When the founders graduated in 2010, they moved their home base to Minneapolis, Minnesota, and began touring as a professional ensemble.

Six Appeal became a full-time touring act by the end of 2011. As a band they have traveled to 49 states and numerous international engagements including Russia and China. The band's current membership consists of the founders Michael Brookens and Jordan Roll, joined by Andrew Berkowitz, Reuben Hushagen, Virginia Cavaliere, and Mel Daneke.

== Discography ==
- Plan A (2013)
- Ugly Sweater Party (2014)
- Live, Pt. 1 (2019)
- Detoured (2022)

== Notable Awards and Performances ==
On March 29, 2012, Six Appeal won an online competition to perform live with Recording Artist Andy Grammer. The performance took place in the Skyway Theater in Minneapolis Minnesota on March 30, 2013.

On May 12, 2012, Six Appeal won the Harmony Sweepstakes A Cappella Festival, taking awards for Audience Favorite as well as Best Original Song. At the 2012 Pacific Northwest Harmony Sweepstakes regional event that Six Appeal won on their way to Nationals, they also won the awards for Audience Favorite, Best Original Song, and Best Original Arrangement.

On October 19, 2012, Six Appeal headlined the Contemporary A Cappella Society's Chicago ACappellaFest collegiate competition.

On January 2, 2013, Six Appeal performed the National Anthem for the 2013 Allstate Sugar Bowl at the New Orleans Mercedes-Benz Superdome. The performance was broadcast nationally live on ESPN.

On August 24, 2018, Six Appeal appeared on the release of PBS Soundstage’s “Kenny Loggins and Friends” live studio concert with Kenny Loggins, Jim Messina, Michael McDonald, David Foster, Thundercat, and others.

Six Appeal has appeared as a featured red carpet performer at the Vanity Fair Oscars Party the past three years: March 4th, 2018, Feb 24th 2019, and Feb 9th, 2020.

Six Appeal won the Grand Prix at the Moscow Spring A Cappella Festival in 2018 and 2019, and is the only group ever to win the championship twice.

Six Appeal headlined the SoJam A Cappella Festival Nov 2nd 2019.

Six Appeal headlined the Girona A Cappella Festival in Girona, Spain May 11th, 2019.
