= New Recording 47 =

Singaporean contemporary a cappella group (since 2018)

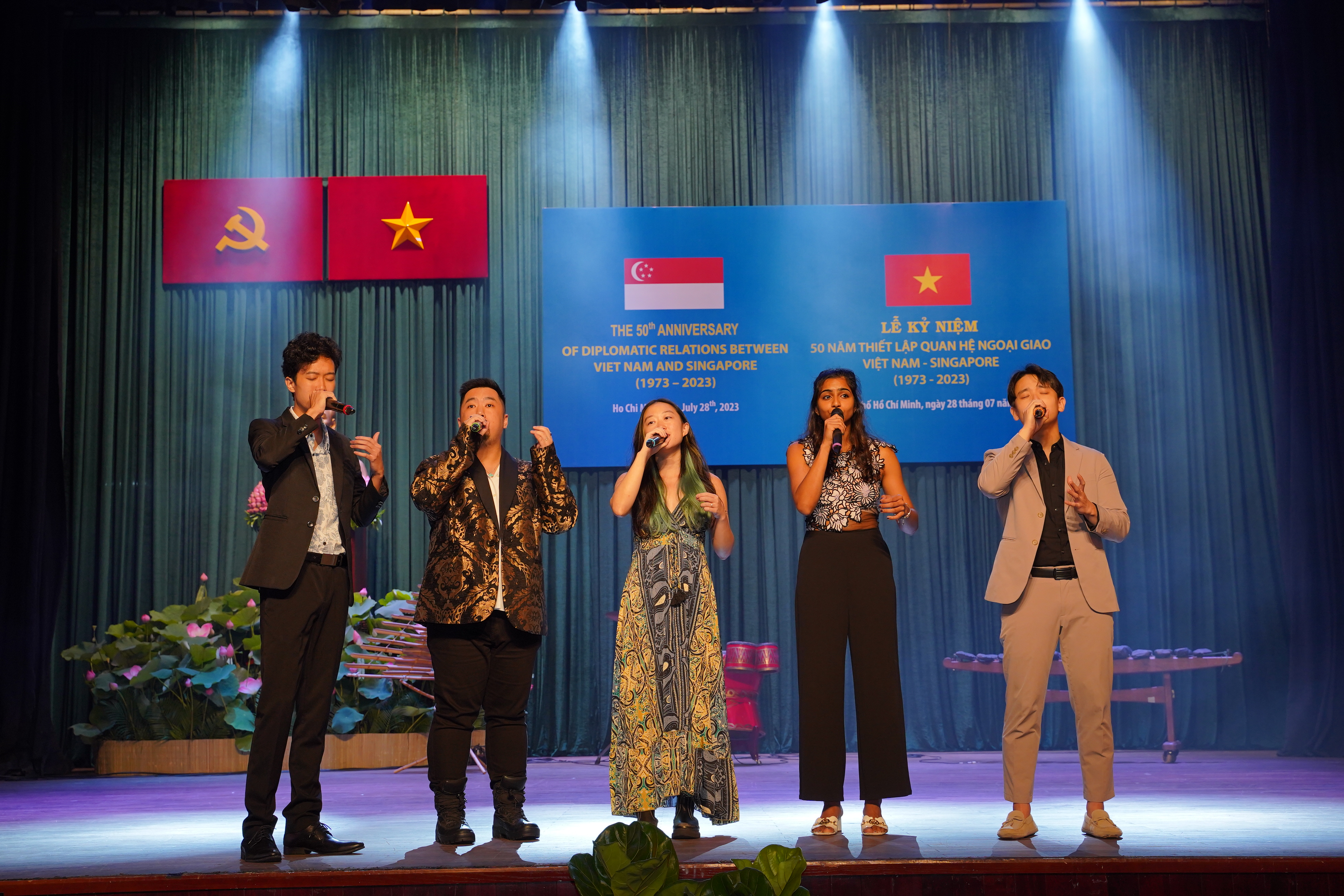
- New Recording 47 performing at the 50th Anniversary of Diplomatic Relations and 10th Anniversary of Strategic Partnership between Singapore and Vietnam at the Saigon Opera House

Background information
- Also known as: NR47
- Origin: Singapore
- Genres: A cappella; pop
- Years active: 2018–present
- Members: Amanda Ong; Sreshya Vishwanathan; Shaun Spencer; KK
- Past members: Lee Yee Kien; Raimi Rusydi; Zach Teo; Sherwin Lam; Ryan Han; Ethan Soh

New Recording 47 (abbreviated NR47) is a contemporary Singaporean a cappella group currently consisting of Amanda Ong, Sreshya Vishwanathan, Shaun Spencer, and Ethan Soh. Set apart by a combination of all five members' arrangement styles, they produce multilingual works of popular songs, oldies, local Singaporean music, as well as original material. They have been featured on Singapore Airlines' Made In Singapore playlist, as well as the 94th Oscars' We Don't Talk About Bruno segment in 2022.

New Recording 47 has released one single to date, titled "What It Used To Be".

In 2023, the group was invited to perform in Ho Chi Minh City as part of celebrations marking the 50th anniversary of diplomatic relations and the 10th anniversary of the strategic partnership between Singapore and Vietnam, marking the group's first international performance.

In 2026, the group released a four-language rendition of "Home", a Singaporean song composed by Dick Lee. The rendition featured performances in English, Mandarin, Malay and Tamil.

== History ==
=== Background ===
New Recording 47 began with Amanda Ong and Shaun Spencer, who are alumni of NP Voices A Cappella, as well as Lee Yee Kien, Raimi Rusydi, and Zach Teo, who are alumni of SP Vocal Talents. Amanda is also a part of the Voices of Singapore A Cappella (VOSA).

In 2018, they met up at a stairwell to sing together, and the first voice memo they recorded in May was labeled 'New Recording 47' on Raimi's Apple iPhone, hence the group name.

In 2021, Lee Yee Kien, Raimi Rusydi, and Zach Teo left the group and made way for three new members: Sreshya Vishwanathan, Sherwin Lam, and Ryan Han. Sreshya and Sherwin are alumni of NUS Resonance, while Ryan is an alumnus of SMU VOIX. In 2024, Sherwin and Ryan also left the group, making way for Ethan to come in during 2025.

=== Post-COVID ===
They released their first single composed by Amanda Ong, titled "What It Used To Be".

In 2022, "What It Used To Be" was featured on Singapore Airlines' Made In Singapore playlist, and one of their TikTok covers appeared in the 94th Oscar's We Don't Talk About Bruno segment.

In 2023, they were invited to perform at the Saigon Opera House for the 50th Anniversary of Diplomatic Relations and 10th Anniversary of Strategic Partnership between Singapore and Vietnam in Ho Chi Minh City, the group's first international venture.

== Members ==
=== Current members ===
- Amanda Ong – soprano (2018–present)
- Sreshya Vishwanathan – alto (2021–present)
- Shaun Spencer – tenor (2018–present)
- KK – vocal percussion, baritone (2026–present)

=== Former members ===
- Lee Yee Kien – vocal percussion, tenor (2018–2021)
- Raimi Rusydi – bass, vocal percussion (2018–2021)
- Zach Teo – alto (2018–2021)
- Sherwin Lam – bass, vocal percussion (2021–2024)
- Ryan Han – vocal percussion, baritone (2021–2024)
- Reno Sam – music director (2023–2024)
- Amit Kashyap – sound engineer (2022–2025)
- Ethan Soh – vocal percussion, bass (2025–2026)

== Discography ==
=== Singles ===
Year	Title	Album
2021	What It Used To Be	None
