= Voice of Men =

Malaysian vocal group

- Born: Fathul Rahman Misbah, Muhammad Lutfi Othman, Mohd Arif Ismail, Yusmawira Mohd Yunos, Mohd Amirul Hakim Md Noor, Che Muhammad Nasrul; Selangor, Johor, Malaysia
- Origin: Malaysia
- Genres: R&B; soul; Islamic
- Occupations: Singer; songwriter; musician; composer; music producer
- Instruments: Vocals; guitar; piano; keyboard; percussion; synthesizers
- Years active: 2009–present
- Label: VMEN Resources
- Website: voiceofmen.net

Voice of Men is a vocal group from Malaysia. The band was formed in 2009 by a group of students in UTM Skudai to participate in Malaysia TV9's reality program called Akademi Nasyid. They came from Engineering background (mostly) with determination in singing in a vocal group. Voice of Men has released their debut album online Laungan Cinta, an internationally successful album produced by Damian Mikhail, in 2013. Recently in 2015, they have released a few singles, as their follow-up album Women We Love, Pesan Abah Buat Amina, This Is My War under the same production company.

Voice of Men, once famous with their parody video of Hijab Makes You Beautiful was one of the top 16 contestants in the Awakening Talent Contest.

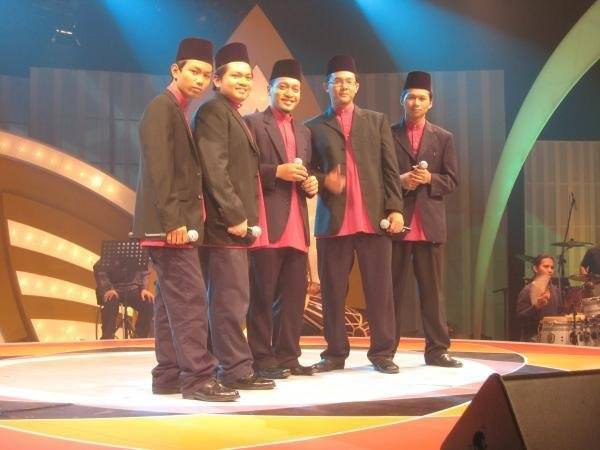
Voice of Men on Akademi Nasyid's stage(2009)

== Discography ==
=== Albums ===
Year	Album details	Certifications
2013	Laungan Cinta (1st single): Released: 16 August 2013; Label: VMEN Resources; Formats: iTunes/Spotify/Deezer/KKBOX	Published by Warner Music Group Malaysia; 11x hits No. 1 in weekly radio chart, IKIM.fm; Top 30 hits song in 2014, IKIM.fm; Final nominees, VIMA Malaysia

=== Singles ===
Saranghaeyo

- Released: March 2020
- Label: VMEN Resources

Women We Love

- Released: November 2014
- Label: VMEN Resources

Pesan Abah Buat Amina

- Released: February 2014
- Label: VMEN Resources

=== Mini album ===
This Is My War featuring Ameen Misran

- Released: May 2015
- Label: VMEN Resources
- Formats: iTunes/Spotify/Deezer/KKBOX
- Total Tracks: 6 Tracks

== Personal life ==
Fathul & Lutfi Voice of Men is married.
