= Monkey Puzzle (band) =

American a cappella music group

Monkey Puzzle is an a cappella music group from Bloomington, Indiana which formed in the mid-1990s, releasing their first CD in 1995. In 1999 they won the award for "Best World/Folk Song" from The Contemporary A Cappella Society and their third CD was nominated by the same organization for Best Album of 1999. As of 2005, they are still performing, though only conducting occasional reunion concerts the most recent of which was in 2013.

The group is known for composing unusual sound mixes and lyrics using the broad range of capabilities present within its members. Their music covers a fairly broad range of music styles including pop/rock, world, folk and even chant.

== Members ==
- Nils Fredland
- Nicole Kousaleos
- Jerry McIlvain
- Daniel Reed
- Dan Schumacher

== Discography ==
- Joie de Croissant, 1995 (MP Records)
- Freakin' on the Lunar Surface, 1996 (MP Records)
- The Where We Were, 1998 (MP Records)
