= The Sixth Generation =

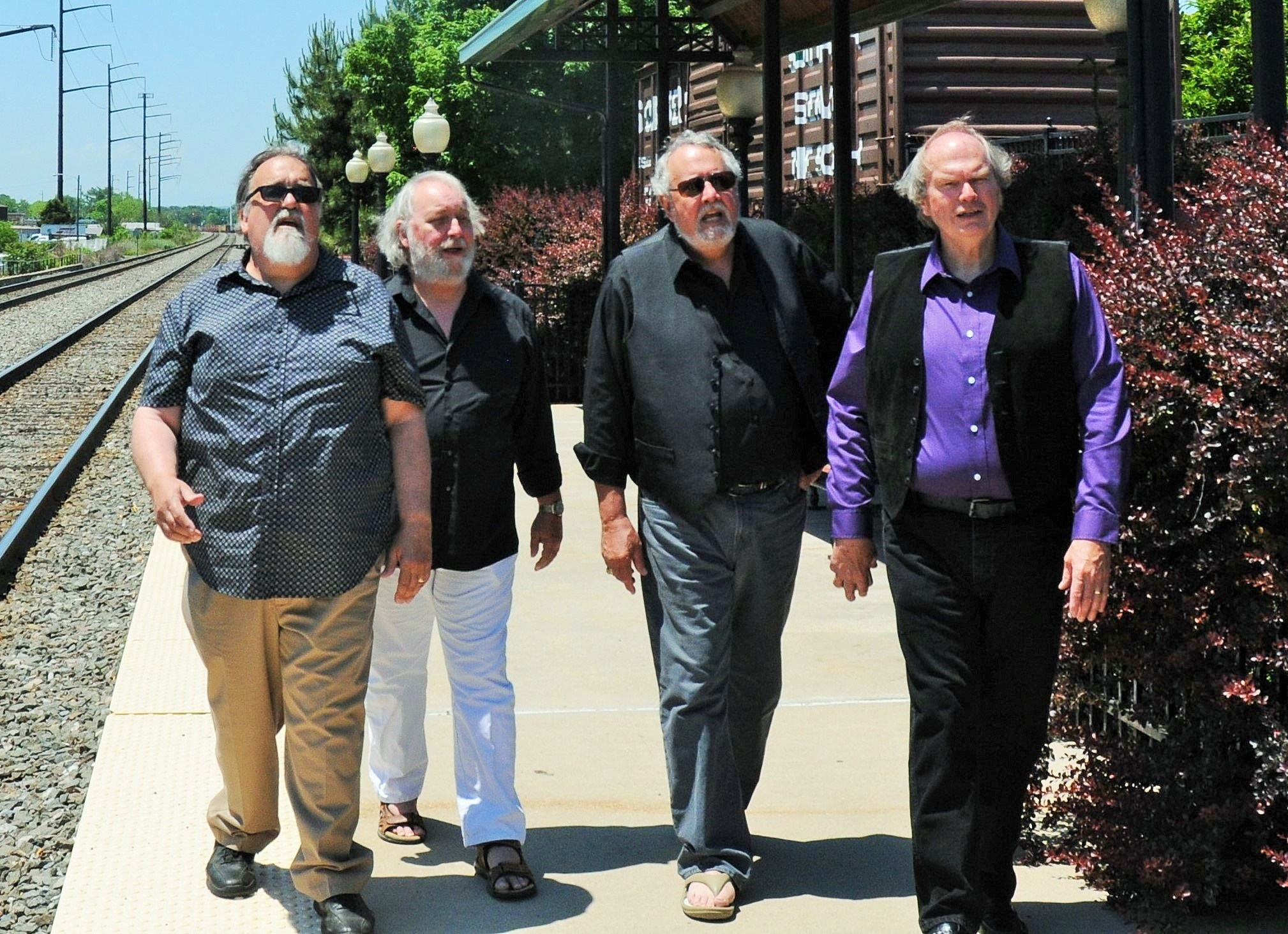
- The Sixth Generation

Background information
- Origin: Niles, Michigan, United States
- Genres: Rock and roll; garage rock; soft rock; adult contemporary
- Years active: 1966–1970, 2011-present
- Labels: GMA; PolyPlat
- Members: Ron Hamrick; Dave Walenga; Paul Davies; Fred Hulce
- Past members: John Dale; Fred Bachman
- Website: www.6thgeneration.rocks

The Sixth Generation is an American rock band formed in 1966 and known for the transcendent harmonies in their music.

The band was active until 1970, then reformed with original members and started touring again in 2011. Their single “Livin’ In A Small Town” peaked at No. 2 on the Billboard Hot Singles Sales chart on August 1, 2015.

== History ==
The Sixth Generation was formed in Niles, Michigan in 1966. They released their first single “This Is The Time” by GMA Records in August 1967. The song was recorded at Sound Studios in Chicago, and it became a number one hit locally. The band performed at venues throughout Michigan, Indiana and Illinois until 1970 when the members disbanded due to college pressures and the draft.

== Reformation ==
The band reunited with original members in October 2010 and began recording and touring again on a broader scale in July 2011. During 2011, the band released a new single “That Was The Time” and were inducted into the Michigan Rock and Roll Legends Hall of Fame. Their album “That Was… This Is,” highlighting their two hit singles and including other original songs as well as remakes of 1960s hitsongs featuring their signature harmonies, was released in October 2012. Their single “Rock On England,” a song about the British Invasion and how it influenced The Sixth Generation, was released in 2013 in conjunction with a UK tour. The song was featured during performances at the legendary Cavern Club in Liverpool and other venues on the tour. 2014 brought the release of two new singles, “Rolling Thunder” and “Dance On The Wind” and performances at venues from the lakefront in Chicago to the National Mall in Washington, DC. The release of “Livin’ In A Small Town” on the PolyPlat label in June 2015 made the Billboard Hot Single Sales chart at No. 3 on July 18, 2015, and was at No. 2 on the August 1, 2015 Billboard Hot Single Sales chart behind the 50 year anniversary re-release of the Rolling Stones’ "(I Can't Get No) Satisfaction".

== Members ==
The band currently consists of original members Ron Hamrick, keyboards and vocals; Dave Walenga, drums and vocals; Paul Davies, bass guitar and vocals; and Fred Hulce, keyboards and vocals. Each member contributes to the band's trademark harmonies, and each sings lead on different songs.

== Discography ==
=== Singles ===
- "This Is The Time" GMA Records (1967)
- "That Was The Time" (2011)
- "Rock On England" (2013)
- "Dance On The Wind" (2014)
- "Rolling Thunder" (2014)
- "Livin' In A Small Town" (2015), PolyPlat

=== Albums ===
- That Was ... This Is (2012)
- Feeling Good (2016)
