= Marcsmen =

American men's a cappella group

The Marcsmen
- Marcsmen logo

Background information
- Origin: San Antonio, Texas
- Genres: Barbershop music
- Years active: 2008–present
- Website: www.marcsmen.org

The Marcsmen are a premier men's a cappella group based in San Antonio, Texas. Chartered by the Barbershop Harmony Society (BHS) in 2008, the chorus has qualified for International Chorus competitions of the BHS 6 times, most recently for the 2020 competition in Los Angeles, California. They won their first Southwestern District championship in 2012 and won back-to-back championships in 2018 and 2019.

== History ==
The Marcsmen were formed mostly of Texas State University students with the intention of entering the inaugural Barbershop Harmony Society Youth Chorus Competition in 2008. 28 members took the stage for that contest under the direction of Brent Dunavant. They were awarded the trophy as the overall winner.

Shortly thereafter, the group applied and received a charter from the Barbershop Harmony Society on August 1, 2008. Since that time, they have followed Dunavant's lead to five runner-up finishes in district competition, a district championship in 2012, and a 20th-place finish at the Barbershop Harmony Society's International Competition in Kansas City, Missouri in 2011. The group returned to the International Competition, placing 13th in Toronto, Ontario in 2013 and 20th in the 2015 International Competition in Pittsburgh, Pennsylvania. The chorus finished 13th at the 2018 International Competition in Orlando, Florida earning a score of 84.3.

The Marcsmen won their second Southwestern District championship in 2018 with a chorus record of 51 men on stage. They followed up that District championship with an 11th-place finish and a score of 85.2, both chorus records, at the 2019 International Competition in Salt Lake City, Utah.

With their third district championship in 2019, the Marcsmen qualified for their 6th international appearance in Los Angeles in 2020.

== Affiliation ==
The Marcsmen is the performing name for the San Marcos, Texas chapter of the Barbershop Harmony Society, a 501(c)3 non-profit organization founded in 1938 consisting of approximately 22,000 members in choruses and quartets across North America.

== Awards and recognition ==
=== District ===
Chorus competition

- Winners: 2012, 2018, 2019
  - Runners-up: 2011, 2014, 2015, 2016, 2017

=== International ===
Top-15 chorus finish

- 11th (2019)
- 13th (2013, 2018)

Top-20 chorus finish

- 20th (2011, 2015)
