= The Coats =

American a cappella group

- Also known as: The Trenchcoats
- Origin: Seattle, Washington, United States
- Genres: Vocal
- Years active: 1987 - Present
- Labels: TCP
- Members: Kerry Dahlen; Doug Wisness; Jamie Dieveney; Keith Michael Anderson
- Website: www.thecoats.net

The Coats (sometimes called The Coats Vocal Band) are an a cappella singing group which was founded in Seattle, Washington in 1987. The group consists of bass singer Kerry Dahlen, baritone Doug Wisness, Jamie Dieveney and Keith Michael Anderson as first and second tenors, respectively. The coats are known mainly on the Northwest coast for their Christmas albums and concerts. The members support local Washington high schools by performing on their stages and donating a percentage of ticket sales to the schools fine arts program.

== History ==
"Singing for tourists, locals, fish vendors, and fellow buskers, our humble ambitions of earning a few clams to fight off the tuition bills quickly evolved into a full-time international performance career."

— The Coats

The group was formed while each of its four members were studying at the University of Washington. They began singing unprofessionally around Seattle, at such locations as Pike Place Market, to pay their way through college. However, their unique singing style attracted attention, and they were soon singing professionally throughout the west coast and other venues around the United States.

=== Name change ===
The Coats were originally known as "The Trenchcoats," but following the Columbine High School massacre, they became unintentionally associated with the Trenchcoat Mafia. Numerous news reports erroneously provided the singing group's web address as that of the killers, so it was quickly simplified to their group's current name.

== Discography ==
The Coats have released two demos & thirteen albums as of December 2016:

- 1989: The Trenchcoats (5 Song Demo)
- 1992: It Turns Me On
- 1994: Your Joy
- 1995: Exposed
- 1996: Are You Up?
- 1999: When I'm With You
- 2000: The Coats Collection
- 2000: On Christmas Time
- 2002: The Boys Are Back
- 2005: Last a Lifetime
- 2006: The Caroler - Christmas with The Coats
- 2009: Caught On Tape
- 2011: A Holiday Tasting (3 Song EP)
- 2014: Highway 1
- 2016: Shine On
