= Brisbane Birralee Voices =

Voices of Birralee is a non-profit youth choral organization, based in Brisbane, Australia, which has gained a reputation for its leading choirs, that have performed in front of audiences in both Australia and across the world.

The organisation was founded in 1995 by Julie Christiansen OAM and has grown to around 400 members from ages 5 – 35, across six ensembles, which include three training choirs (Birralee Piccolos, Birralee Kids and Birralee Singers) and three signature choirs (Brisbane Birralee Voices, Birralee Blokes and Resonance of Birralee). A seventh, project choir, Birralee Recycled, was added in 2016, for adults aged 18 and older.

The organisation has released ten CDs: 'So Far' (Resonance only), 'Towards Infinity' (Blokes only), 'Sing We Now of Christmas', 'Among Friends', 'World Full of Colour', 'Can You Hear Me?', 'Within Reach!', 'Come To The Music', 'A Live Anniversary Concert' (2005) and 'Walls Come Tumblin' Down'.

== Participation ==
Julie Christiansen is the organisation's founder and artistic director, beginning Voices of Birralee in 1995 with the philosophy that singing is as natural for a child to do as talking, walking and dancing.

Voices of Birralee has a number of conductors for its choirs, including Julie Christiansen OAM (Birralee Singers), Paul Holley OAM (Birralee Blokes & Resonance of Birralee), Jenny Moon (Brisbane Birralee Voices), Peter Ingram (Birralee Recycled), Debbie Daley (Birralee Kids) and Katherine Ruhle (Birralee Piccolos).

Accompanists include Justine Favell, Brendan Murtagh, Claire Preston and Kate Littlewood.

Choirs cater for children and young adults from 5 - 35, with rehearsals tying in with the Queensland school year. Rehearsals are held mainly at Birralee HQ in Bardon, with some of the training choir rehearsals held at Eagle Junction State School and Resonance of Birralee rehearsing at Brisbane Girls Grammar School.

== Performances ==
The choirs have performed at events such as World Vision International Children’s Choir Festival 2004–Korea. At this event the choir was shown on free-to-air television once a day for a seven-day period. At this event the choir was invited, along with choirs from around the world, to represent Australia and the South Pacific. In 2005 the choir performed at the Pacific International Children’s Choir, or Piccfest, being the guest choir.

Other venues the choir has performed at are the Cathedral of St Stephen, Brisbane's Concert Series, hosting the Dresden Philharmonic Kinderchor, An Evening with President Clinton, Australian of the Year Awards, World of Children's Choirs International Festival - Vancouver, Brisbane City Council Carols in King George Square and Brisbane Riverstage, Brisbane Lord Mayor's Christmas Carols, with the Queensland Symphony Orchestra at BCEC, QPAC and other venues, at the Old Museum, Government House, City Hall and many venues in and around Brisbane. Choristers from Voices of Birralee also performed at the opening and closing ceremonies of the Commonwealth Games held on the Gold Coast, Queensland, in 2018

== Awards ==
- The Birralee Blokes won the ABC Classic FM Choir of the Year award in 2006.
- Brisbane Birralee Voices won all six categories in the annual Winter Sonata, in Prague, 2010.
- The Birralee Blokes won Choir of the World in the Powell River International Choral Kathaumixw in 2012.
- Resonance of Birralee was awarded Gold and Silver Medals at the World Choir Games in Graz, Austria in 2008.
- Voices of Birralee Founder and Artistice Director Julie Christiansen was awarded an Order of Australia Medal in 2006
- Voices of Birralee Associate Director and Conductor of Birralee Blokes and Resonance of Birralee Paul Holley was awarded an Order of Australia Medal in 2016.

== Tours ==
Voices of Birralee choirs have toured to locations including the United States of America, Canada, Singapore, Korea, Tasmania, New Zealand, England, Austria, Germany, Czech Republic, Italy and Kazakhstan.

In 2014, Voices of Birralee was selected in a nationwide bid by the Department of Veterans Affairs to provide choral music to the centenary commemorations of the First World War on the Western Front in France and Belgium. This commitment involved over 200 singers during the course of the contract.

== Major events ==
Since Voices of Birralee began, the organisation has initiated and/or managed many events, including:

- Pemulwuy! National Male Voices Festival, a triennial festival for boys and men who love to sing, which has now been held in 2009, 2011, 2014 and 2017.
- Voices from the Trenches Choral Festival, a three part choral festival held in Brisbane and Toowoomba in 2017 to commemorate the Anzacs through song. The Finale was held at Pemulwuy! National Male Voice Festival. This project was proudly supported by the Queensland Government.
- Queensland Youth Music Awards, an annual music-based eisteddfod for choral and instrumental, inviting primary and secondary schools from across greater Brisbane.
- Poppies & Poems, a concert held at Queensland Performing Arts Centre in September 2018 to celebrate the poetry and music written during and after WW1. This project was proudly supported by the Queensland Government.
