= Voices of Gotham =

Voices of Gotham (VoG) is a competitive and performing chorus composed of approximately 60 singers from New York City and surrounding areas. VoG represents the 'Hell's Kitchen, New York' chapter of the Barbershop Harmony Society and is the 2013 Mid-Atlantic District Chorus Champion. VoG was designated the 10th best barbershop chorus in the world in the 2017 Barbershop Harmony Society International Chorus Competition in Las Vegas, Nevada. Voices of Gotham was founded by 12 charter members on January 8, 2008, and holds weekly auditions for prospective singers.

== Activities ==
Voices of Gotham hosts an annual event called the Tin Pan Alley Novice Quartet Contest each year in varying locations in New York City. A large number of quartets, many assembled specifically for the event, sing one song each in pursuit of their goal to "Win the Tin." Despite the somewhat informal nature of the event, a panel of accredited judges from the Barbershop Harmony Society adjudicate the event. In addition to standard Gold, Silver and Bronze medals, the winning quartet is also awarded the coveted Tin Pan, an antique tin pan inscribed with the quartet names of all prior champions.

== Awards and honors ==
- October 2011 – Mid-Atlantic District Chorus Champions
- July 2012 – First time International Barbershop Harmony Society Chorus Competitor; 18th Place (out of 28)
- February 2013 – Awardee of funding from the Lower Manhattan Cultural Council – Manhattan Community Arts Fund in support of its Harmony with Heart program.
- July 2013 – First time finishing in the top 10 in Barbershop Harmony Society International Chorus contest; Tied-8th Place (out of 29)
- February 2014 – Awardee of funding from the Lower Manhattan Cultural Council – Manhattan Community Arts Fund in support of its Harmony with Heart program.
- February 2014 – Awardee of funding from the Lower Manhattan Cultural Council – Fund for Creative Communities in support of its 2014 Performance Series.
- August 2014 – Awardee of funding from the New York City Department of Cultural Affairs Cultural Development Fund in support of its 2014–2015 Performance Series.
- July 2015 – Awardee of funding from the Barbershop Harmony Society Innovation Grant Program in support of its 2015 Arrangers Lab Program.
- July 2017 – Top-ten finisher in the Barbershop Harmony Society's International Chorus Competition.

== Accolades and coverage ==
- Featured on WSRK 103.9 FM as promotion for guest appearance on Oneonta, NY chorus show following Hurricane Sandy.
- Participants in the 2012 Phoenicia International Festival of the Voice for "Barbershop Day."
- Listed as one of prominent a cappella groups in New York City as part of Time Out New York article. "There’s no better way to establish your own a cappella group than to meet, greet and pry away a few members of this versatile male barbershop chorus—the Voices of Gotham."

== Related groups ==
Smoke Ring, which features two members of Voices of Gotham, is the 2024 Mid-Atlantic District Quartet Champion.
