= The Buzztones =

UK cappella group

- Members: Panny Charalambous – tenor Christopher Cook – tenor David Edwards – tenor Samuel Harrop – tenor Woodrow Hughes – tenor Simon Pollitt – tenor Philip Sherrard – tenor Bruce Walcroft – tenor Christopher Botten – baritone Robert Harding – baritone Christopher Pollitt – baritone Edward Hallinan – bass James Rose – bass Ricky Whaites – bass David Morgan – bass
- Past members: James King – bass
- Website: Official site

The Buzztones are a UK-based a cappella group formed in 2011. They were finalists of the 2013 View from The Shard singing competition and debuted at the Edinburgh Festival Fringe with their sell-out show Nevermind the Buzztones in 2013. They returned to the Fringe with a new show, Buzzology, in August 2015.

== History ==
The group were founded as a break-away group from London male chorus, Eschoir. Their musical output is predominantly made up of 'pop' covers and 'mash-ups' of songs by UK and US-charting artists.

Hailing from London, The Buzztones have performed at the BBC's Pink Tent, also headlining The Bedford, Balham with sell-out shows in 2012, 2013 and 2015. They performed the anthems at the England vs Wales Rugby World Cup match held at Twickenham Stadium on 26 September 2015.

== Appearances ==
The group's comedic leanings have seen their musical talents being put to use on TV shows such as Channel 4's The Last Leg and Loaded, and BBC Three's Siblings, as well as several appearances on BBC's The One Show.

== Honors and awards ==
On 7 May 2018, The Buzztones were crowned as first place winners of the Moscow Spring A Cappella Competition in their group category.
