= Herb Curtis =

Canadian novelist and humorist

Herb Curtis (born 1949) is a Canadian novelist and humorist who writes about and has long lived in New Brunswick. He is best known for writing the Brennen Siding Trilogy, three connected novels set in the fictional community of Brennen Siding, New Brunswick (loosely based on Kennan Siding, New Brunswick). The trilogy consists of the novels The Americans are Coming, The Last Tasmanian and The Lone Angler. The most critically acclaimed of the series is The Last Tasmanian which won the 1992 Thomas Head Raddall Award and was nominated for the Commonwealth Prize. In 1999, Curtis was nominated for the Stephen Leacock Memorial Medal for Humour for his collection of humorous stories, Luther Corhern's Salmon Camp Chronicles and in January 2018 he was presented with the prestigious Sesquicentennial Medal in recognition of his valuable service to the nation.

Curtis grew up near Blackville, New Brunswick, and currently resides in Fredericton. His novels The Americans are Coming and The Last Tasmanian have both been adapted for the stage, and the former has also become and a standard text in schools throughout Atlantic Canada and Quebec. In 2006, Curtis was a contributing author to The Penguin Anthology of Canadian Humour.

== Works ==
- The Americans are Coming - 1989
- The Last Tasmanian - 1991
- Look What the Cat Drug In - 1991
- Slow Men Working In Trees - 1991
- Hoofprints on the Sheets - 1993
- The Lone Angler - 1993
- The Silent Partner - 1996
- The Scholten Story - 1996
- Gifts to Last: Christmas Stories from the Maritimes and Newfoundland (Contributing Author) 1996
- Luther Corhern's Salmon Camp Chronicles (1999)
- Atlantica: Stories from the Maritimes and Newfoundland (Contributing Author) 2001
- The Penguin Anthology of Canadian Humour (Contributing Author) 2006
- Bruno Bobak (Contributing Author) 2006
- From the Ashes (A compilation researched in co with historian Bernard Colepaugh) 2025
