= SONO (vocal group) =

SONO is a vocal group from Aarhus, Denmark singing rhythmic a cappella music. The group consists of 23 singers ranging in age from 20-35.

== History ==
Founded in 1990 by Jim Daus Hjernøe as Can't Help It, the name was changed to SONO in 2007. Since 2002, SONO has been singing under the direction of Tine Ohrt Højgaard.

== Competitions ==
SONO won the Rhythmic Choir Cup at Aarhus in 1994.

In May 2009, SONO won first prize at the Aarhus International Vocal Festival in Denmark.

== Recordings ==
In the fall of 2007, SONO's first CD "Can't Help It!" was released. In 2011 SONO released their second album "Playground".

== Reviews ==
"Playground" was reviewed by The Recorded A Cappella Review Board and received a score of 4,3 out of 5.
