= Blue Jupiter =

American a cappella pop-funk singing group

- Origin: New York City, New York, U.S.
- Genres: Vocal, A cappella, Pop/Rock
- Years active: 2001–present
- Labels: Independent
- Members: Marty Gasper; Jonathan Minkoff; Diana Preisler; Jeff Washburn
- Website: http://www.bluejupiter.com/

Blue Jupiter is an a cappella pop-funk singing group.

Formed in late 2001, Blue Jupiter sings covers and renditions of songs. Most of their songs are a cappella, but sometimes acoustic instruments have small and light parts.

== Biography ==
Blue Jupiter is a vocal band from New York City. Three of the members attended Berklee College of Music. The group first surfaced when it won Oreo's "Milk's Favorite Jingle Contest" hosted by Randy Jackson from American Idol. It later performed at VH1's Save The Music Event and at Breaking the Cycle (an annual AIDS fundraiser), and toured Hong Kong. It also appeared in the Harmony Sweepstakes in Chicago, Washington, D.C., and New York City. Blue Jupiter has toured in Asia, from China to Japan.

== Musical style ==
Blue Jupiter covers and produces renditions of popular songs without instruments. The group's first album was Ear Candy.

== Members ==
- Diana Preisler: female lead
- Jeff Washburn: tenor lead
- Jonathan Minkoff: baritone lead, instrument mimicry
- Marty Gasper: beatbass (Vocal percussion and vocal bass combined)
