= Mosaiko =

Ukrainian vocal collective

Μωσαϊκὸ (Mosaic)
- Origin: Kerch, Crimea, Ukraine
- Genres: Pop, Laiko, Byzantine music
- Years active: 1999–present
- Website: https://en-mosaiko-collective.blogspot.com/

Μωσαϊκὸ (Mosaic) is a Ukrainian vocal collective established in 1999 in Kerch.

== History ==
The collective Μωσαϊκό was born on September, 1st, 1999 on the basis of Kerch's School of Arts of R.Serdjuka under the guidance of Olga Ivanovna Verenich . They debuted on January 7th, 2000 with two Greek songs Σαγαπώ (Sagapo) and Μπουζούκι (Buzuki) at a meeting with the Kerch's Greek Cultural-Educational Society. The repertoire has replenished then with orthodox prays Προσευχή (Proseuhi) and Χριστός Ανέστη (Christos Anesti) in the Greek language, etc.

From the moment of collective's foundation, the chairman of the Kerch's Greek Cultural-Educational Society Boris Ilich Babich actively helped with a musical material, by his profound knowledge of history, and organised meetings with the Greek societies of different cities.

On October, 27th, 2000 under the invitation of director Natalya Bondarchuk (supervisor), the singing collective “Μωσαϊκό” has taken part in scene shootings «Children of the future Kerch» having sung songs in the Greek language. The participant of ensemble Elias Verenich has acted in film in a role of small tsar Mitridat in an episode «Coronation of Mitridat» .

Throughout all years of existence, the singing collective “Μωσαϊκό” accepts active participation in a cultural life of a city, acting with concerts and at meetings with societies of national minorities - Greek, Bulgarian, Tatar, Armenian, Jewish, etc.

Since 2000 the singing collective “Μωσαϊκό” annually takes part in the international festival «Bosporsky Agones» with execution of the Byzantian church chants and prays in the Greek language.

Since 2001 the singing collective “Μωσαϊκό” worked over the Byzantian liturgy and modern Greek songs in a genre λαϊκά (Laikó tragoudi).

In February, 2002 the singing collective “Μωσαϊκό” took part in the competitive program «Stars on a scene!» on Television channel UT-1 in Kyiv, having occupied 2 place.

Annually, on June, 3rd, in the day of St. Konstantin and Elena meetings of Greeks of Ukraine and Crimea are held in village Chernopole in which the singing collective “Μωσαϊκό” accepts regular participation.

Within the next years singing collective “Μωσαϊκό”:

• takes part on Ukraine festival-competition of the Greek song of Tamara Katzy in Mariupol,

• is the guest of honour and traditionally opens annual international festival of arts «Meetings in Zurbagan» in Feodosiya, within the limits of Grin's Readings on which not only scientists - expert's of Grin from Russia, Ukraine, Belarus, Latvia, the far abroad, gather, but also writers, musicians, artists, admirers of Grin's creativity from different cities of the world meet together,

• on blessing of the Metropolitan Simferopol and Crimea Lazarus by forces of the singing collective “Μωσαϊκό” a documentary video film Heritage had been made. In it orthodox prays in the Greek language of 12th - 16th centuries are executed. Shootings were spent in vicinities of Bakhchisarai on blessing of archimandrite Siluan, the prior of the Monastery of the Holy Dormition in Bakhchsarai. Shootings were direct in a monastic Temple in honour of the Dormition of Most Holy Mother of God, and also in caves of Chufut-Kale,

• spent meetings-concerts with visitors of a city, the American both Bulgarian delegations and the French scientists-archeologists from Paris,

• gives concerts in the cities of Feodosiya, Simferopol, in archaeological camp "Artezian", at scientific conferences in Partenit, etc.

All concerts pass in warm friendly conditions.

Last eight months the singing collective “Μωσαϊκό” is improved in creative commonwealth with the chief of Kerch's management of culture Konovalov A. N.

In April 2008 the singing collective “Μωσαϊκό” has protected a rank of the exemplary (i.e. went through the official procedure required for obtaining an exemplary degree).
