= J. F. A. McManus =

Canadian pathologist (1911-1980)

Joseph Forde Anthony McManus (July 13, 1911 – March 4, 1980) was a Canadian pathologist who is best known for his formulation of one of the most frequently used stains in histopathology; the McManus Periodic acid-Schiff stain. Joe McManus was a pioneer in the field of Histochemistry during its period of expanding growth and application in the 1940s and 1950s. He was, furthermore, an exceptionally observant microscopist. The term he coined "Juxtaglomerular Complex" was used to denote the relationship of the renal tubular macula densa to the arteriolar granular cells. It was derived from his observations that the golgi of the distal tubular cells were reversed to a position beneath the nuclei in the macula densa and that the basement membrane between the macula densa and arteriolar cells was absent. His publications on glomerular obsolescence and late in his career on the dialysis kidney were based upon the same meticulous study of renal morphology.

== Education ==
Dr. Joseph F. A. McManus was born in Blackville, New Brunswick, Canada on 13 July 1911, the son of Dr. John Patrick Cantwell McManus (1867-1938) and Mary Clare Rose Forde (1870-1931). After graduating from Fordham University in 1933, he enrolled at Queen's University in Kingston, Ontario where he received his MD degree in 1938 and where he also played on the university football team and boxed as a light heavyweight, winning an intercollegiate championship. After graduation from Queens he was accepted as the resident pathologist at Johns Hopkins University and the Cornell University-New York Hospital. He returned to Canada to enlist in the Royal Canadian Army Medical Corps.

== Military service and early research ==
From 1940 to 1945, McManus served in the Royal Canadian Army Medical Corps. While he was stationed in England at Aldershot outside of Farnsborough at No.8 Canadian General Hospital, he met Professor J. R. Baker. It was in Baker's laboratory in the Department of Zoology and Comparative Anatomy at Oxford University, Dr. McManus developed a number of histochemical procedures including a Sudan black B procedure for demonstrating phospholipids. This work was to mark the beginning of his influence in identifying the chemistry of microscopic structure.

In 1944, he joined the allied expeditionary force in the invasion of the continent with the British Liberation Army serving in field hospitals in Belgium and the Netherlands. Dr. Harold Taylor has pointed out that it was at this time that Joe's interest in fundamental biology became evident. Dr. Taylor happened to follow after McManus in three army hospitals, and in each he found that McManus had left a legacy: the best trained histology technicians Dr. Taylor had ever encountered. They had been painstakingly taught to use the McManus Periodic acid-Schiff stain to study normal kidneys, which led to his unique contributions on the nature of the juxtaglomerular complex.

That anecdote probably illustrates better than any other the early promise of a distinguished scientific career. Where many other physicians had found laboratory work in the army a chore, McManus had made the very best use of the available resources. Many of the principles of histochemistry had been established before the outbreak of war, but developing and applying them to the physiologic and pathologic problems were mainly a post-World War II contribution to medical science.

His honorable discharge carried the rank of Major and following the war, he returned to Professor Baker's department as a Beit Memorial Fellow. It was during this fellowship in 1946, the details of the Periodic acid-Schiff (PAS) reagent method for the staining of aldehyde components of mucosubstances were delineated. The impact of this staining procedure on the study of the kidney morphology is well known. Indeed, Dr. McManus' classic monograph on Medical Diseases of the Kidney is based upon the usefulness of the method.

== Academic career ==
After leaving England in late 1946, Dr. McManus took up a position as Assistant Professor of Pathology first at the University of Alabama and then two years later in Virginia. In 1953 he returned to the U of A and he became Professor of Pathology for the next 8 years. It was there in collaboration with Robert Mowry, Charles Lupton and Sidney Kent, that the department became one of the best known medical centers for research and education. In 1960 he teamed with Dr. Robert Mowry to write Staining Methods; a handbook integrating newer histological and histochemical methods of tissue examination into standard laboratory procedures.

After a one-year sabbatical in Oxford in 1960 working back at the same lab where he had made his earlier discovery, McManus accepted a teaching position at Indiana University. He was a pioneer in the combined M.D. / PhD. program there until 1965. Through this period, his work was pivotal to the development of a number of MD-PhD graduates, many of whom hold important academic positions today. While at Indiana he wrote The Fundamental Ideas of Medicine: a Brief History of Medicine. Written from a philosophical point of view, this text is still much sought after. This experience in medical' education also brought to fruition the publication of a textbook, General Pathology, in 1966. He became the President of the American Society of Experimental Pathologists in 1962-1963, the year of the Society's fiftieth anniversary.

From 1965 to 1970, he served as the Executive Director of the Federation of American Societies for Experimental Biology in Bethesda, Maryland. His vision and enthusiastic leadership set the scene for a new phase of Federation affairs resulting in considerable growth in services to the scientific community. Next he was appointed to be the Dean of the Medical University of South Carolina. During his four-year tenure (1970–1974) as Dean of the Medical University of South Carolina, he provided the impetus for the establishment, with area hospital leaders, of a consortium of statewide hospitals for undergraduate and postgraduate medical education. He recruited an outstanding faculty with his own scholarship and academic achievements attracting many young investigators for whom he was a constant source of inspiration. Following the deanship, McManus returned to research at the Medical University of South Carolina, producing a detailed description of the histopathologic changes occurring in kidneys after long-term dialysis.

== Civil rights advocacy ==
An ardent advocate for civil rights, during his tenure at the University of Alabama in the '50s, McManus frequently travelled down to Tuskegee University from Birmingham to lecture during a time when helping black academia was a sometimes precarious undertaking. He was also responsible for the hiring and training of the first black medical lab technicians at the Birmingham Hospital. During his tenure as Dean at the University of South Carolina, McManus also established a minority admission program and hired an old friend, Dr. Middleton Lambright, as the Dean of Minority Students. Here is an excerpt from a tribute to Dr. Lambright from the Congressional Record.

"He believed in taking chances and seeking new opportunities. In 1971, he was offered and accepted a position as Assistant Dean and Associate Professor of Surgery in the College of Medicine at the Medical University of South Carolina. He was quoted as saying: ‘My father would have been extremely pleased to know that his son had been invited to join the staff and faculty of an institution he could not have hoped to enter in any capacity.’ He was speaking to the racial segregation in the State of South Carolina."

== Special appointments ==
- Special Consultant in Pathology, Surgeon General, United States Public Health Service (Member, Pathology Study Section,
- N.I.H.); Member, Pathology Training Grant Committee;
- Board of Trustees, Biological Abstracts
- President, American Society for Experimental Pathology
- Secretary, American Biology Council;
- Vice President, Scientific Manpower Commission; Liaison Member, National Research Council
- Managing Editor, FEDERATION PROCEEDINGS;
- Domestic Fellow, Commonwealth Foundation; Member,
- Veterans Administration Research and Education Career Development Committee, 1973-1977.

== From The Canadian Medical Association Journal ==
By Dr. Robert H. More

"Although an American citizen for many years, Joe McManus continued to visit his Canadian friends and attend many Canadian meetings in spite of the numerous demanding professional and scientific positions which he held for more than 3 decades... He showed the fearlessness of a fighter, regardless of the odds against him whenever it seemed important to state his opinion on controversial scientific, professional or political problems. As a distinguished alumnus he was constantly in touch with Queens University and participated in the scientific program held during the 100th anniversary of the Queen's University Medical School".

== McManus Pas Method For Glycogen ==
- Fixation
  - 10% Buffered Neutral Formalin
- Section
  - Paraffin, @ 6 micrometres.
- Staining Procedure
  - Digest using a diastase, hyaluronidase, or sialidase procedure
1. Deparaffinize and hydrate to distilled water
2. Oxidize in Periodic Acid, 0.5%, 5 minutes and rinse in distilled water
3. Strain in Coleman's Feulgen, or Schiff's Reagent, 15 minutes and wash in running water to develop the pink color, 10 minutes.
4. Counter stain in Haris Hematoxylin, 6 minutes, or Light Green working Solution, 10 seconds. Light Green is better used when delineation of fungi is required. Prepare the working solution by adding Light Green, 0.2% solution 1:5 with distilled water, proceed to step #7, dehydration. Tap water and ammonia decolorize Light Green.
5. Wash in running water and transfer to Acid Alcohol, 1%, for 3-10 quick dips. Wash again in distilled water.
6. Dip in dilute Ammonia Water, 0.3%, to blue the sections and again wash in running water for ten minutes.
7. Dehydrate in 95% alcohol and 100% alcohol, clear in Xylene, two changes each.
8. Mount.
- Results
  - Nuclei blue
  - Fungi red
  - Background when Light Green is used as the counter stain green, pale
