= Streetnix =

Canadian a cappella group formed 1991

- Origin: Saskatoon, Saskatchewan, Canada
- Genres: A cappella
- Years active: 1991–2002
- Label: Mock Turtle Records
- Past members: Ward Arnold; Joel Cherland; Xylon Cozens; Trent Funk; Aaron Genest; BJ Harris; Tony Hughes; Rich Sinclair; Corey Slutsky; Thom Speck; Dave Young Peter Graham
- Website: www.streetnix.com

Streetnix was a Canadian a cappella group based in Saskatoon, Saskatchewan. They performed more than 2,500 shows across Canada and the United States, at one time making over 300 appearances a year.

== History ==
Streetnix was founded in 1991. Original members were Aaron Genest, BJ Harris, Tony Hughes, Ward Arnold, Rich Sinclair and Xylon Cozens. The group performed at festivals, fairs and cultural events as well as at concerts.

In 1998, Streetnix won the Contemporary A Cappella Society 'Pop/Rock Album of the Year' award for their album Ignition.

Streetnix disbanded in 2002.

== Members ==
- Aaron Genest (September 1991–April 2002)
- BJ Harris (September 1991–April 2002)
- Tony Hughes (September 1991–April 2002)
- Ward Arnold (September 1991–December 1994)
- Rich Sinclair (September 1991–December 1992)
- Xylon Cozens (September 1991–December 1992)
- Dave Young (January 1993–May 1995)
- Trent Funk (May 1995–June 1998)
- Joel Cherland (July 1998–June 1999)
- Thom Speck (July 1999–August 2001)
- Corey Slutsky (September 2001–April 2002)
- Peter Graham, MD (dates unknown)

== Discography ==
- Listen (1993) - produced by Don Schmid of The Northern Pikes
- Time Permitting (1995) - produced by Ian Armstrong
- Ignition (1998) - produced by Darryl Neudorf and Dave Mockford
- The Lost Tapes (1998)
- Listen (re-release 1998)
- Real (2001)

Featured on:

- The Non-Happner's - One Degree of Shade (1995)
- Chris Martin - Self Titled (1996)
- Jolene Beyette - Jolene Beyette (1997)
- A Cappella All-Stars: The 1998 CARAs (1998)
- Indie Buzz: Super Crunchy (1999)
- Hot Lips: The Vocal Band Sampler (1999)
