= Grandma's Boys =

Barbershop quartet

- Genres: Barbershop
- Years active: 1968–86
- Members: Don Barnick – tenor (from 1976); Hank Brandt – lead Jay Giallombardo – baritone John Miller – bass
- Past members: Jeff Calhoun – tenor (to 1975); Jim Sikorski – tenor (1975–1976)

Grandma's Boys is the barbershop quartet that won the 1979 SPEBSQSA International Contest.

In the summer of 1968, a quartet of New Trier High School students from the North Shore of Chicago rode a Greyhound bus to Cincinnati, checked into the "Y", sat in the back row at the international contest and listened in awe as quartets like the Western Continentals, Mark IV, and Golden Staters won the top medals. They had recently named the quartet, and 11 years later, when three of the original four ran onstage in Minneapolis to claim their own gold medals, it still bore the name Grandma's Boys.

Jay Giallombardo (baritone), Hank Brandt (lead), John Miller (bass), and Jeff Calhoun (tenor) were singing in three different high school quartets when they first got together on Memorial Day in 1968. Their determination to stick together was rigorously tested over the next few years. Miller and Giallombardo went off to college (at Bradley University in Peoria and the University of Kansas, respectively); a year later Brandt and Calhoun enrolled at Dartmouth College in New Hampshire, spreading the quartet over 1,500 miles (2,400 km). The next year, Giallombardo transferred to Boston University, and Miller moved to Syracuse University, which brought them somewhat closer together, allowing them more opportunity to rehearse and perform at Barbershop chapter shows.

Upon graduation, the Boys all settled back home in the Chicago area, until Calhoun moved to Denver. Jim Sikorski was recruited from Milwaukee, and the quartet jumped from 10th place in international competition in 1974 to 3rd place in 1975. Sikorski had to drop out, and the Boys' coach, Mac Huff recommended Don Barnick of Cleveland. After only a few weeks of rehearsals with a new tenor, Grandma's Boys placed sixth in the 1976 contest. The combination proved the right one, however; in 1978 the quartet won silver medals, and at the Minneapolis convention in 1979 they walked offstage with the Landino Trophy and the gold medals of International Champions.

Miller stayed with the group exactly one more year, before moving to Los Angeles and a career in TV that now has him presiding over marketing the NBC Sports Network. Randy Loos moved from Atlanta and sang bass with the group for their remaining six years. John went on to win another championship in 1985 with The New Tradition quartet; Barnick sang bass with Keepsake; Giallombardo became the founding director of the New Tradition Chorus in Northbrook, Illinois; and Brandt worked for the Association of International Champions for a while.

== Discography ==
- Tonight LP
- I Had a Dream, Dear LP
- Grandma's Boys III LP
- When The Toy Soldier Marched On Parade CD

Preceded by Bluegrass Student Union	Barbershop Harmony Society International Quartet Champions; 1979	Succeeded by Boston Common
