= Auto Towners =

Barbershop quartet

The Auto Towners
- Origin: Detroit, Michigan, U.S.
- Genres: Barbershop
- Years active: through 1969
- Past members: Al Rehkop – tenor; Glenn Van Tassel – lead; Clint Bostick – baritone; Carl Dahlke – bass

The Auto Towners is a Barbershop quartet that won the 1966 SPEBSQSA international competition.

At the time they won the 1966 SPEBSQSA International Championship (held in Chicago), the Auto Towners were composed of Al Rehkop (tenor), Glenn Van Tassell (lead), Clint Bostick (baritone), and Carl Dahlke (bass). An original song composed by Rehkop, "In My Brand New Automobile", has been covered by other barbershop quartets including Bluegrass Student Union. Rehkop and Van Tassel won a second international championship with the Gentleman's Agreement quartet in 1971.

== Discography ==
- The Auto Towners – AIC Masterworks CD

Preceded by Four Renegades	SPEBSQSA International Quartet Champions; 1966	Succeeded by Four Statesmen
