= Ringmasters (barbershop quartet) =

Swedish barbershop quartet

- Origin: Sweden
- Genre: Barbershop
- Members: Victor Nilsson – tenor Jakob Stenberg – lead Rasmus Krigström – baritone Didier Linder – bass
- Past members: Martin Wahlgren – bass Emanuel Roll – baritone
- Website: Ringmasters.se

Ringmasters is a Swedish barbershop quartet affiliated with the Society of Nordic Barbershop Singers (SNOBS). The quartet received first place gold medals at the Nordic Barbershop Quartet Contest in Stockholm (April 2008), and won the Barbershop Harmony Society International Collegiate Championship in July 2008 in Nashville, Tennessee. On July 8, 2012, at the Society's International Convention in Portland, Oregon, they became the first quartet from outside North America to win the prestigious gold medal as International Quartet Champions. The quartet sings non-traditional barbershop harmonies with a contemporary touch. They still tour and perform all over the world.

== Background ==
As a competing barbershop quartet, Ringmasters has earned several awards and accolades, the most prestigious being the Barbershop Harmony Society International Quartet Championship Gold Medal in Portland, Oregon on July 8, 2012. Their other accomplishments include the Society's International Collegiate Quartet Championship in 2008 and first place at IABS barbershop contest in 2007, and SNOBS gold in 2008.

Three members of Ringmasters are also members of Zero8, who are the European Champions for 2022 and the SNOBS Champion Chorus led by Rasmus Krigström of Ringmasters. The chorus was previously directed by Doug Harrington of Second Edition.

Ringmasters mentored Lemon Squeezy, a fellow Swedish barbershop quartet who would win the International Quartet Championship themselves in 2025. Krigström arranged some of the songs that Lemon Squeezy sang en route to winning gold, including one that explicitly credited Ringmasters as mentors and forebearers for the newer quartet.

== Members ==
All four founding members attended Adolf Fredrik's Music School, and Stockholms Musikgymnasium, two high-profile music schools in Stockholm.

- Victor Nilsson – tenor
- Jakob Stenberg – lead
- Rasmus Krigström – baritone
- Didier Linder – bass
- Martin Wahlgren – original bass
- Emanuel Roll – original baritone

== Discography ==
- Ringmasters I (CD; 2012)
- Ringmasters II (CD; 2013)
- Ringmasters III (CD; 2014)
- Ringmasters IV (CD; 2022)

Preceded by Old School	SPEBSQSA International Quartet Champions; 2012	Succeeded by Masterpiece
