= Dealer's Choice (quartet) =

Barbershop quartet

- Genres: Barbershop
- Past members: Al Kvanli – Tenor; Bill Thornton – Lead; Brian Beck – Baritone; Gary Parker – Bass

Dealer's Choice is a barbershop quartet that won the 1973 SPEBSQSA international competition in Portland, Oregon. They were the first group since 1952 to win the competition their first year entering – a feat not repeated until Acoustix did so in 1990.

The Dealer's Choice Award is given annually by the Barbershop Harmony Society to the highest-scoring quartet making its first appearance in the international competition, and was first awarded in 2009. In 2015, Dealer's Choice was inducted into the Barbershop Harmony Society Hall of Fame.

Preceded by Golden Staters	SPEBSQSA International Quartet Champions; 1973	Succeeded by Regents
