= Creole Cutie =

Creole Cutie is a song written for barbershop quartet, originally performed in 1950. It was co-written by Glenn Sudduth and Bill 'Bus' Busby (Sudduth wrote the chorus, Busby later wrote the verses). Its copyright is held by SPEBSQSA (now the Barbershop Harmony Society), as the authors donated the song.

== History ==
Both Sudduth and Busby were members of an a cappella group called the Miamians. The group was having difficulty mastering diction, especially during slow, melodic songs. According to Sudduth, he got so fed up with the director's chiding that he decided to write a song that would require near-perfect diction. One week later, Sudduth returned to the Miamians with the chorus of Creole Cutie. The Miamians adopted Sudduth's song as a warm-up exercise.

Busby later asked Sudduth if there were verses to the song he'd written. Sudduth allegedly said "There's no verses, but you're welcome to write them." Sudduth and Busby later donated the entire song to the SPEBSQSA collection.

== Performance ==
The song rose to fame thanks to a barbershop group called The Confederates, in which Busby sang baritone. The group shot to fame and success, winning the 1956 International Quartet Championship in Minneapolis, MN just three years after they formed. As Busby was a co-writer of Creole Cutie, the song became a regular feature in their set until they stopped performing in 1969.

Creole Cutie is most known as a challenging song that is well known but rarely performed. It is instead used as a warm-up. Because of this usage, it remains one of the most widely known songs within the barbershop community.

== Lyrics ==
The chorus is as follows:

Creole cutie won't you cuddle up closer

Down by the babbling brook on the bayou

Ding dong dolly with a dimple on her knee

The devil's in her eye now don't be shy
