= Westminster Chorus =

American men's a cappella chorus based in California

- Choir
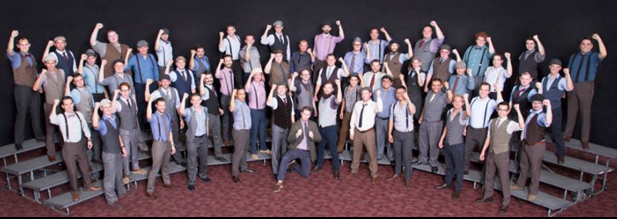
- The Westminster Chorus, October 2014
- Origin: Westminster, California
- Founded: 2002
- Genre: A cappella, Barbershop music
- President: Lucas Der Mugrdechian
- Director: Dr. Dan Wessler
- Website: www.westminsterchorus.org

The Westminster Chorus is an American men's a cappella chorus based in Westminster, California. Founded in 2002, the group has won five gold medals as part of the Barbershop Harmony Society International Chorus Champions (2007, 2010, 2015, 2019, and 2024) and won the 2009 "Choir of the World" title at the Llangollen International Musical Eisteddfod in Wales.

== History ==
=== Founding and early years (2002–2006) ===
The Westminster Chapter (known as the Harmony Showcase Chorus) of the Barbershop Harmony Society (BHS) had existed for decades, but by the early 2000s had dwindled to just eight aging members and had not competed in a decade. In 2002, five young barbershop singers from the Masters of Harmony (the “Founding Five”) approached the Westminster chapter, seeking to rebuild a youth chorus under its charter. The chapter agreed, and within weeks the newly formed Westminster Chorus had 15 members and began rehearsals.

The group made its competition debut at the 2002 SoCal West divisional contest and advanced to the Far Western District competition that fall. Though Westminster unofficially won the district contest, it was disqualified due to an ineligible member. The following year, the chorus returned and officially won the district championship, qualifying for the 2004 International Chorus Contest, where it placed 9th in its debut.

In 2006, under director Royce Ferguson, the chorus returned to the BHS International Stage and won a silver medal, becoming the youngest chorus ever to place that high in the contest.

The Westminster Chorus, 2006

=== First championship and Llangollen victory (2007–2009) ===
In July 2007, the chorus won its first BHS International Chorus Championship, tying with the Ambassadors of Harmony and winning on a singing category tiebreaker. With an average age in the mid-20s, Westminster became the youngest chorus ever to win the international title.

In 2009, the chorus traveled to Wales to compete in the Llangollen International Musical Eisteddfod. There, it won the Barbershop Chorus and Folk Song Choir categories, placed second in the Male Choir competition, and advanced to the finals. Performing classical repertoire, Westminster became the first barbershop chorus to win the prestigious "Choir of the World" Pavarotti Trophy.

=== Continued growth and record scores (2010–2019) ===
In 2010, under new director Justin Miller, the chorus won its second BHS International Championship in Philadelphia, scoring 97.7% – the highest chorus score in Barbershop Harmony Society history at the time. In 2013, the chorus placed second at the BHS International Contest in Toronto, missing the gold medal by just two points to Toronto Northern Lights.

In 2015, Westminster earned its third gold medal in Pittsburgh, scoring 97.5%, at the time the third-highest score in contest history. In 2019, Westminster returned with 100 singers and won the gold medal in Salt Lake City with a record-breaking score of 97.9%, performing arrangements from The Greatest Showman and The Wild Party.

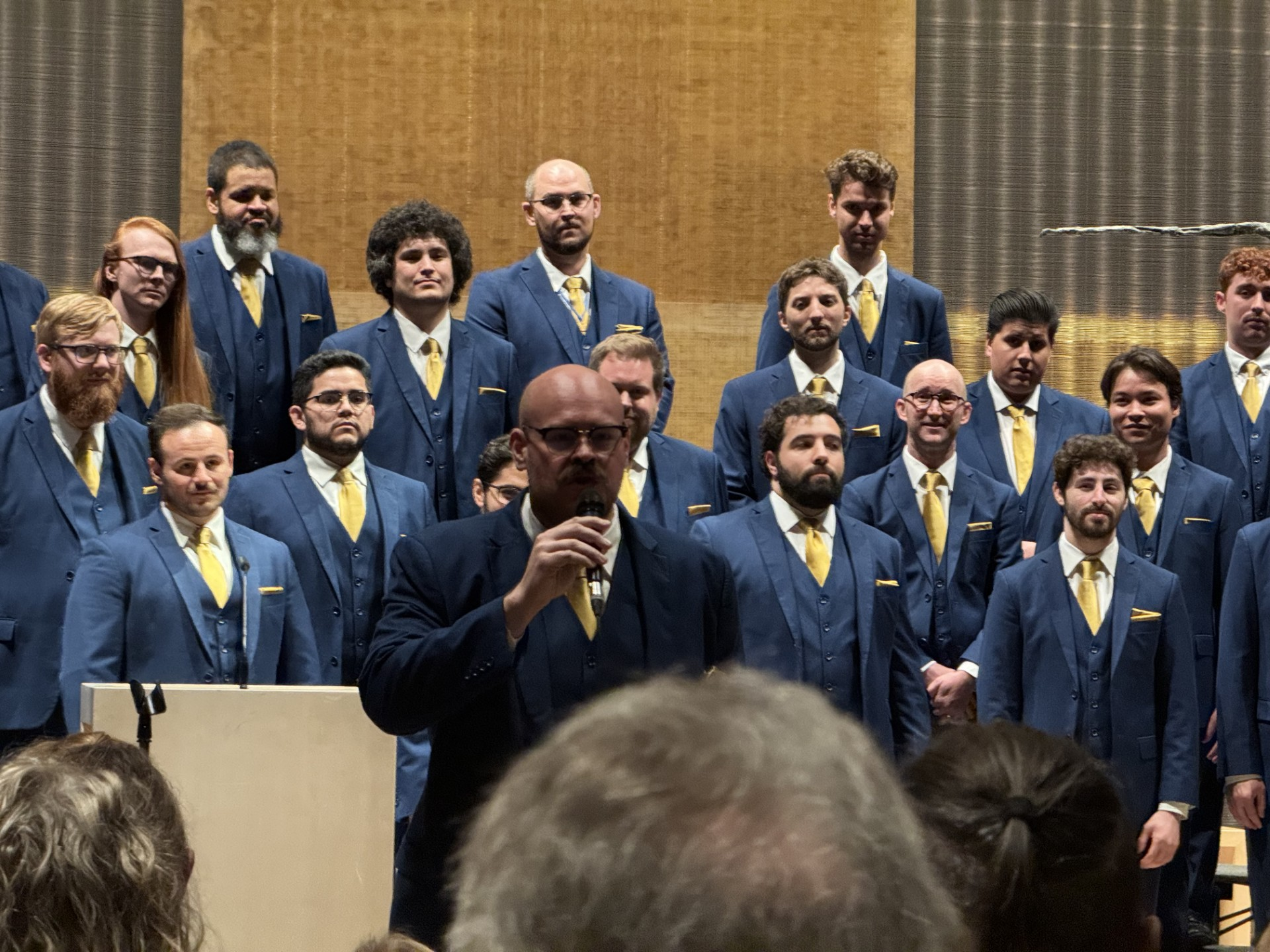
Westminster Chorus performing in Munich, March 2026

=== Recent activities and fifth championship (2020–) ===
Due to the COVID-19 pandemic, no international contests were held in 2020 or 2021. In 2024, under new director Dr. Dan Wessler, Westminster returned to win its fifth International Chorus Championship in Cleveland, Ohio.

On March 6, 2026, Westminster performed at the American Choral Directors Association's Western Region Conference in San Jose, California. The same month, the chorus also completed a European tour with stops in Stockholm, Sweden, performing with Zero8, Munich, Germany, performing with Herrenbesuch, The Hague, Netherlands, performing with Mixed Nuts, ending with a performance as the guest ensemble at the Barbershop in Germany Barbershop Music Festival in Wuppertal, Germany.

== Repertoire and style ==
While rooted in traditional barbershop harmony, Westminster is known for its diverse musical selections, which include classical works, musical theatre pieces, and contemporary a cappella. Performances are often noted for their vocal precision, choreographed movement, and emotional engagement.

== Quartets ==
Members of Westminster Chorus have also participated in various Barbershop quartets, including OC Times (International Quartet Champions, 2008), Masterpiece (International Quartet Champions, 2013), The Newfangled Four (Next Generation Barbershop Varsity Quartet Champions, 2013), The Vagrants (Next Generation Barbershop Varsity Quartet Champions, 2009), and Flightline (Next Generation Barbershop Varsity Quartet Champions, 2017).

== Honors and impact ==
The chorus has played a role in revitalizing youth interest in barbershop singing. It has also appeared at choral events such as the American Choral Directors Association national conference, and continues to perform at international festivals, youth outreach events, and barbershop shows.

=== Barbershop Harmony Society International Chorus Champions ===
Westminster Chorus is a five-time gold medal winner of the Barbershop Harmony Society International Chorus Championship in 2007, 2010, 2015, 2019 and 2024.

Preceded by Ambassadors of Harmony	Barbershop Harmony Society International Chorus Champions; 2024	Succeeded by Vocal Majority
Preceded by Vocal Majority	Barbershop Harmony Society International Chorus Champions; 2019	Succeeded by Music City Chorus
Preceded by Ambassadors of Harmony	Barbershop Harmony Society International Chorus Champions; 2015	Succeeded by Vocal Majority
Preceded by Ambassadors of Harmony	Barbershop Harmony Society International Chorus Champions; 2010	Succeeded by Masters of Harmony
Preceded by Vocal Majority	Barbershop Harmony Society International Chorus Champions; 2007	Succeeded by Masters of Harmony
