= Regents (quartet) =

American barbershop quartet from southeastern Pennsylvania

The Regents
- Genres: Barbershop
- Years active: from 1970
- Past members: Harry Williamson – tenor; Joe Mazzone – lead (from 1971); Ron Knickerbocker – baritone (lead until 1971); Hal Kauffman – bass; Ralph Childs – tenor; Dave Reed – baritone (to 1971)

The Regents is a Barbershop quartet that won the 1974 SPEBSQSA international competition. The quartet hailed from southeastern Pennsylvania. One of the singers was Ron Knickerbocker, a high school science teacher at the Downingtown Senior High School. The quartet won the championship after several years of being in the top five finalists.

Preceded by Dealer's Choice	SPEBSQSA International Quartet Champions; 1974	Succeeded by Happiness Emporium
