= The Vikings (1950s quartet) =

Barbershop quartet

- Origin: Rock Island, Illinois
- Genres: Barbershop
- Years active: 1946–1955
- Past members: Bob Maurus – tenor Bruce Conover – lead Bob Lindley – baritone Bob Livesay – bass Carl Stuhr – bass (1946–51)

The Vikings is a Barbershop quartet that won the 1953 SPEBSQSA international competition.

Preceded by Four Teens	SPEBSQSA International Quartet Champions; 1953	Succeeded by Orphans
