= Four Statesmen =

Barbershop quartet

The Four Statesmen
- Genres: Barbershop
- Years active: 1963–1978
- Members: Frank Lanza – tenor Dick Chacos – lead Doc Sause – baritone Don Beinema – bass

The Four Statesmen was a Barbershop quartet that won the 1967 SPEBSQSA international competition. The group was notable for its members residing in four different U.S. states—Connecticut, Massachusetts, New Hampshire, and Rhode Island—making long-distance rehearsals a logistical challenge.

Preceded by Auto Towners	SPEBSQSA International Quartet Champions; 1967	Succeeded by Western Continentals
