= Gay Notes =

Barbershop quartet

The Gay Notes
- Genres: Barbershop
- Years active: 1953 – mid-1960s
- Past members: Harold Jones – tenor; Howard Rinkel – lead; John Loots – baritone; Morris "Mo" Rector – bass

The Gay Notes is a barbershop quartet that won the 1958 SPEBSQSA international competition.

== Discography ==
- Strictly Barbershop (1963; LP)

Preceded by Lads of Enchantment	SPEBSQSA International Quartet Champions; 1958	Succeeded by Four Pitchikers
