= Sidewinders =

Barbershop quartet

The Sidewinders
- Genres: Barbershop
- Past members: Jerry Fairchild (tenor); Joe Daniels (lead); Gene Boyd (baritone); Jay Wright (bass)

The Sidewinders is a Barbershop quartet that won the 1964 SPEBSQSA international competition.

== Discography ==
- Here's Barbershop (1963; LP)
- Sidewinders (1964; LP)
- Sunrise-Sunset (LP)
- Re-Released (double-LP compilation)

Preceded by Town and Country Four	SPEBSQSA International Quartet Champions; 1964	Succeeded by Four Renegades
