= Misfits (quartet) =

Barbershop quartet

The Misfits
- Origin: Chicago, Illinois
- Genres: Barbershop
- Years active: from 1941
- Past members: Joe Murrin – tenor Art Bielan – lead E.V. "Cy" Perkins – baritone Pete Buckley – bass

Misfits is a Barbershop quartet that won the 1945 SPEBSQSA international competition.

Preceded by Harmony Halls	SPEBSQSA International Quartet Champions; 1945	Succeeded by Garden State Quartet
