= Garden State Quartet =

Barbershop quartet

The Garden State Quartet
- Origin: New Jersey
- Genres: Barbershop
- Years active: from 1941
- Past members: Ted Rau – tenor; Bob Freeland – lead; Jack Briody – baritone (from 1942); Joe Marrese – bass; Jimmy Verdick – baritone (to 1942)

The Garden State Quartet is a Barbershop quartet from Jersey City, NJ, that won the 1946 SPEBSQSA international competition. Members included Ted Rau (tenor), Bob Freeland (lead), Jack Briody (baritone) and Joe Marrese (bass).

Preceded by Misfits	SPEBSQSA International Quartet Champions; 1946	Succeeded by Doctors of Harmony
