= Most Happy Fellows =

Barbershop quartet

- Years active: 1967–2008
- Past members: Bob Hodge – tenor (lead 1968–1971); Larry Hassler – lead (from 1971); Jack Lyon – baritone (from 1977); Ken Hawkinson – bass (to 1988); Harry Aldrich – lead (to 1968); Bob Jones – baritone (to 1977); Matthew Rice – bass (1988–1993); Tom Wilkie – bass (from 1993)
- Website: AIC Site

Most Happy Fellows is the Barbershop quartet that won the 1977 SPEBSQSA international competition in Philadelphia.

Lead, Larry Hassler went on to marry the daughter of Baritone Jack Lyon. Tom Wilkie joined the quartet at Bass upon the death of Ken Hawkinson (1996–2007). Since the 1990s, Matthew Rice became the lion in the Wizard of Oz Package, taking over the bass voice part.

== Discography ==
- Most Happy Fellows, AIC Masterworks CD
- Most Happy Fellows & Chicago News, cassette
- At Ease, LP/cassette
- Thanks For The Memories, LP/cassette
- We're Off To See The Wizard, LP/cassette

They also appear on Showtime at Seaside (1995; cassette) by QCED (Quartet Champions of the Evergreen District).

== See also ==
- Barbershop music
- Barbershop Harmony Society
- List of quartet champions by year

Preceded by Innsiders	SPEBSQSA International Quartet Champions; 1977	Succeeded by Bluegrass Student Union
