= Lemon Squeezy =

Swedish barbershop quartet

- Origin: Sweden
- Genres: Barbershop, a cappella
- Years active: 2010–present
- Members: Victor Nilsson – tenor (formerly lead); Mikael Holst – lead Sam Molavi – baritone Martin Jangö – bass
- Past members: Alexander Löfstedt – tenor (2010–2016); Jonathan von Döbeln – baritone (2010–2016); David Holst – lead (2016–2026)
- Website: Official site

Lemon Squeezy is a Swedish barbershop quartet that won the 2025 Barbershop International Quartet Championships.

== History ==
Originally formed in 2010 by tenor Alexander Löfstedt, lead Victor Nilsson, baritone Jonathan von Döbeln and bass Martin Jangö, they first came to prominence in 2012, when they won the International Collegiate Championship in Portland, Oregon, during the same event at which their mentors and fellow Swedish singers Ringmasters won the International Quartet Championship. While the International Collegiate Championship (which is age-restricted to only younger singers) was a significant step for them, it does not carry the same prestige as the International Quartet Championships (the open division), in which Lemon Squeezy failed to medal that year.

Lemon Squeezy continued competing and placing very well in the International Quartet Championships, culminating in a second-place finish in 2016. They continued singing over the next several years, but both Löfstedt and von Döbeln left the quartet, leaving Nilsson and Jangö to cycle through other singers before finally landing on a lineup with Nilsson sliding over to tenor rather than lead, with David Holst (himself a former International Collegiate champion with Trocadero) assuming lead responsibilities and Sam Molavi taking over at baritone.

This revamped lineup competed in the International Quartet Championships for the first time in nearly a decade in 2023, finishing second. Lemon Squeezy did not participate in the 2024 championships, but returned for the 2025 championships in Denver. Singing songs including "Only One Road" by Celine Dion, "Popular" from Wicked, and a parody of "All-American Prophet" from the Book of Mormon, Lemon Squeezy finally won the gold medal.

Despite a pledge by Jangö to leave the quartet if they won the gold, he continued singing with Nilsson and Molavi after the event. Holst continued singing with the others only intermittently, being occasionally replaced by his brother, Mikael Holst. After the group returned for the 2026 World Championships in St Louis, Missouri, to perform a small number of songs and to present the gold medals to that year's new champions, the younger Holst brother officially replaced the elder.

== External link ==
- Official website

Preceded by Three and a Half Men	SPEBSQSA International Quartet Champions; 2025	Succeeded by GQ
