= Pacific Coast Harmony =

Mixed-gender barbershop chorus

- Origin: San Diego, California, U.S.
- Genres: A cappella
- Years active: 1960s–present
- Website: pacificcoastharmony.org

Pacific Coast Harmony (PCH) is the San Diego, California, chapter of the Barbershop Harmony Society. The mixed-gender chorus sings in the a cappella style known as barbershop music. In its origin, PCH was an all-male chorus, placed 19th overall at the chorus competition at the Society's international convention in Indianapolis in 2006, and placed 22nd in Portland in 2012 and Las Vegas in 2017. In 2019, Pacific Coast Harmony converted to mixed-gender membership, and is currently directed by Sweet Adelines member Bonnie McKibben. Among the more notable quartets formed by chorus members are Balancing Act and Midnight Laundry, which were judged in 2024 as the best senior and novice quartets, respectively, in the Southeast Division of the society's Far Western District.
