= Barfly =

Barfly may refer to:

- Barfly (album), 1995 album by the band Buck-O-Nine
- Barfly (club), a music venue in Camden Town, London, UK
- Barfly (film), 1987 American film starring Mickey Rourke and Faye Dunaway
- Barfly, a bar in Montreal on Saint Laurent Boulevard
- Barfly, a comic strip in the Irish music magazine, Hot Press
- Barfly Assembler Development System, a software package for the Amiga
- Bartlesville Barflies, a 1930s barbershop quartet
