= Classic Collection =

Barbershop quartet

- Also known as: Three Lads and a Dad (into early 1970s)
- Genres: Barbershop
- Years active: 1968–present
- Members: Curt Hutchison – tenor Larry Wilson – lead George Davidson – baritone (from 1976); Terry Heltne – bass
- Past members: "Papa Joe" Heltne – baritone (to 1976)

Classic Collection is the barbershop quartet that won the 1982 SPEBSQSA international competition. Members of the quartet are: Curt Hutchison, tenor; Larry Wilson, lead; George Davidson, baritone and Terry Heltne, bass.

== Discography ==
- A Barbershop Album vol. 1, cassette
- A Barbershop Album vol. 2, cassette
- Special Request, cassette
- The Classic Collection, cassette and CD
- Signature cassette, CD
- Masterwork Series, CD

Preceded by Chicago News	Barbershop Harmony Society International Quartet Champions; 1982	Succeeded by Side Street Ramblers
