= Doctors of Harmony =

Barbershop quartet

- Origin: Elkhart, Indiana
- Genres: Barbershop
- Years active: 1943–1950
- Past members: Jumbo Smith – tenor; Max Cripe – lead (from 1944); Butch Hummel – baritone; Lee Kidder – bass; Ron Younce – lead (to 1944)

Doctors of Harmony, from Elkhart, Indiana, is a Barbershop quartet that won the 1947 SPEBSQSA international competition.

Preceded by Garden State Quartet	SPEBSQSA International Quartet Champions; 1947	Succeeded by Pittsburghers
