= Four Harmonizers =

Barbershop quartet

The Four Harmonizers
- Origin: Chicago, Illinois
- Genres: Barbershop
- Past members: Charles Schwab – tenor; Leo Ives – lead; Huck Sinclair – baritone (from 1943); Fred Stein – bass; Ed Young – baritone (to 1943)

The Four Harmonizers was a Barbershop quartet that won the 1943 SPEBSQSA international competition.

This Chicago quartet also competed in the 1941 and 1942 national contests of the Society for the Preservation and Encouragement of Barbershop Quartet Singing in America, Inc. (SPEBSQSA), now known as the Barbershop Harmony Society (BHS). Original members of the quartet were Charles Schwab, tenor; Leo Ives, lead; Ed Young, baritone; and Fred Stein, bass. In early 1943, Huck Sinclair replaced Young on baritone.

The Harmonizers championship performance was almost a disaster. When Ives blew the pitch for their last song, not a sound came out. However, each competing quartet had been given a harmonica as a souvenir. Thinking fast, Ives reached in his other pocket for the souvenir harmonica, blew the pitch a step too low, and the quartet continued on with the song.

Sinclair was furious when they walked off stage, and immediately announced that he quit the quartet. He later relented when they were named the champions.

None of the arrangements they sang were written down. Instead, they improvised the harmonies as they sang, an art known as "woodshedding," a common practice among early Society quartets.

Preceded by Elastic Four	SPEBSQSA International Quartet Champions; 1943	Succeeded by Harmony Halls
