= Four Pitchikers =

Barbershop quartet

The Four Pitchikers
- Genres: Barbershop
- Past members: Larry Hedgepeth – tenor; Keith Keltner – lead; Keith Young – baritone; Joe Delzell – bass

The Four Pitchikers is a Barbershop quartet from Missouri that won the 1959 SPEBSQSA international competition in Chicago.

== Discography ==
- Let's Bust One! (1963; LP; with Ken Keltner singing tenor)

| Preceded by Gay Notes | SPEBSQSA International Quartet Champions; 1959 | Succeeded by Evans Quartet |
