= Mid States Four =

Barbershop quartet

The Pittsburghers
- Genres: Barbershop
- Years active: 1940s–1966, 1982–1988, 1999
- Past members: Bob Mack (Bob Rodriguez) – tenor (to 1988); Marty Mendro – lead; Forry Haynes – baritone; Art Gracey – bass (1947–1966); Bob Corbett – bass (before 1947); Phil Hansen – bass (from 1982); Don Barnick – tenor (1999)

The Midstates Four is a Barbershop quartet that won the 1949 SPEBSQSA international competition.

Preceded by Pittsburghers	SPEBSQSA International Quartet Champions; 1949	Succeeded by Buffalo Bills
