= Revival (quartet) =

American barbershop quartet

- Genres: Barbershop
- Years active: 1995–2005
- Members: Royce Ferguson – tenor Mike Spencer – lead Mike Lawton – baritone Bill Myers – bass

Revival was a barbershop quartet that won the 1998 SPEBSQSA international competition, after placing 15th in 1996 and 9th in 1997.

Primarily from the San Diego area, the quartet was founded in the summer of 1995 and soon progressed in barbershop quartet competitions. After earning the title of 1997 Far Western District Champions, Revival went on to become the 1998 International Quartet Champions on July 4, 1998, in Atlanta, Georgia.

Revival performed for over 400,000 people in 38 states and 5 countries, and appeared on ABC, NBC, CBS, CNN and BBC television and radio stations. They shared the stage with The Swingle Singers in London, England; sang with Dick Van Dyke and the San Diego Symphony; and made two CDs, each of which was nominated for two Contemporary A Cappella Recording Awards. They performed in Ireland, England, Canada, Germany; performed and taught harmony courses in St. Petersburg, Russia; and were featured in the PBS special, "Can't Stop Singing" which was broadcast to over 75 affiliates nationally.

Revival disbanded in 2005.

== Discography ==
- CD – Revival, 1998 International Quartet Champions (1998)
- CD – Joyfully, I'll Travel On (2004)

Preceded by Yesteryear	SPEBSQSA International Quartet Champions; 1998	Succeeded by FRED
