= Chiefs of Staff (quartet) =

Barbershop quartet

- Members: Tim McShane – tenor Chuck Sisson – lead Dick Kingdon – baritone Don Bagley – bass

Chiefs of Staff is the Des Plaines, Illinois-based Barbershop quartet that won the 1988 SPEBSQSA international competition.

== Discography ==
- Memories (Cassette, CD)
- Solid Gold (LP, Cassette, CD)
- Tribute (LP, Cassette, CD)
- National Anthems on Tape with Northbrook chorus, (Tape, Cassette)

Preceded by Interstate Rivals	Barbershop Harmony Society International Quartet Champions; 1988	Succeeded by Second Edition
