= Town and Country Four =

Barbershop quartet

The Town and Country Four
- Genres: Barbershop
- Past members: Leo Sisk – tenor Larry Autenreith – lead Jack Elder – baritone Ralph Anderson – bass

The Town and Country Four is a Barbershop quartet that won the 1963 SPEBSQSA international competitions with singers Leo Sisk (tenor), Larry Autenreith (lead), Jack Elder (bari), and Ralph Anderson (bass).

The Town & Country Four were the first barbershop society quartet to win their gold medal following three consecutive silver medals (in the years of 1960–62) as well as their 3rd place bronze medal in 1959. Thus, they placed in the top three medalist positions five times. The quartet was also the first champion to win internationally, as the 1963 convention was held in Toronto, Canada for the first time in the history of the society. Their Autenreith arrangements gave them their identity in competition with other greats of that era like the Suntones, Gala Lads, Sidewinders, and Four Renegades. The T&C family was scheduled to honor their fathers on the 50th anniversary of their championship in 2013—in Toronto, Canada, where they had originally won.

| Preceded by Gala Lads | SPEBSQSA International Quartet Champions; 1963 | Succeeded by Sidewinders |
