= Welzenbach =

Welzenbach is a surname. Notable people with the surname include:

- Bob Welzenbach, tenor in the barbershop quartet Oriole Four
- Linda Welzenbach, American geologist and namesake of the minor planet 6468 Welzenbach
- Willo Welzenbach (1900–1934), German mountaineer
