= Elastic Four =

Barbershop quartet

The Elastic Four
- Genres: Barbershop
- Past members: Herman Struble – tenor Roy Frisby – lead Jimmy Doyle – baritone Frank Thorne – bass

The Elastic Four is a Barbershop quartet that won the 1942 SPEBSQSA international competition.

Main Article on Barbershop wiki: Elastic Four

Preceded by Chord Busters	SPEBSQSA International Quartet Champions; 1942	Succeeded by Four Harmonizers
