= Evans Quartet =

Barbershop quartet

The Evans Quartet
- Origin: Salt Lake City, Utah
- Genres: Barbershop
- Years active: 1927–1980
- Past members: Turk Evans – tenor; Pres Evans – lead (bari before 1957); Gene Smith – baritone (to 1971); Jack Evans – bass (lead before 1957); Clarence Evans – lead (before 1929); George Evans – bass (to 1940); Al Nielsen – bass (1940–1957); Bob Evans – baritone (from 1971)

The Evans Quartet is a barbershop quartet that won the 1960 SPEBSQSA international competition.

== Discography ==
- Merry Christmas – Barbershop Style (1961; LP)
- The Evans Quartet (1964; LP)

Preceded by Four Pitchikers	SPEBSQSA International Quartet Champions; 1960	Succeeded by The Suntones
