= Chicago News =

Barbershop quartet

- Genres: Barbershop
- Members: Ray Henders – tenor Butch Koth – lead Greg Wright – baritone Tom Felgen – bass

Chicago News is the Illinois district Barbershop quartet that won the 1981 SPEBSQSA international competition.

== Discography ==
- Latest Edition CD
- Special Edition LP, cassette (dupe'd in "Latest Edition")
- Have You Heard The News? LP cassette (dropped)
- Most Happy Fellows & Chicago News, cassette

Preceded by Boston Common	Barbershop Harmony Society International Quartet Champions; 1981	Succeeded by Classic Collection
