= Harmony Halls =

Barbershop quartet

The Harmony Halls
- Genres: Barbershop
- Past members: Ed Gaikema – tenor (from 1943); Bob Hazenberg – lead (from 1943); Gordon Hall – baritone; Ray "Curley" Hall – bass; Frank Clark – tenor (1942–1943); Harold Hall – lead (to 1943); John "Slim" Peterson – tenor (before 1942)

The Harmony Halls is a Barbershop quartet that won the 1944 SPEBSQSA international competition.

Preceded by Four Harmonizers	SPEBSQSA International Quartet Champions; 1944	Succeeded by Misfits
