= Yesteryear (quartet) =

Barbershop quartet

- Genres: Barbershop
- Members: Dan Trakas – tenor Mark Blake – lead Rod Nixon – baritone Randy Baughman – bass
- Website: Official site

Yesteryear is a barbershop quartet that – coached by Darryl Flinn, Lance Heilmann, Larry Ajer, Greg Lyne, and other big names in barbershop – won the 1997 SPEBSQSA international competition.

The original version of Yesteryear was formed in February 1984. Over the years, five personnel changes led to the championship foursome.

== SPEBSQSA International competition results ==
Yesteryear achieved the following results in SPEBSQSA International competitions:

- 1993: 8th place
- 1994: 3rd place (bronze medal)
- 1995: 2nd place (silver medal)
- 1996: 2nd place (silver medal)
- 1997: 1st place (gold medal)

== Discography ==
- Champions (CD; 1998)

| Preceded by Nightlife | SPEBSQSA International Quartet Champions; 1997 | Succeeded by Revival |
