= Side street (disambiguation) =

A side street is a street that intersects a main street and ends there.

Side Street or Streets may also refer to:

- Side Street (1929 film), a black-and-white talking movie featuring all three Moore brothers
- Side Streets (1933 film), a British drama film
- Side Streets (1934 film), a romantic melodrama starring Aline MacMahon
- Side Street (1949 film), an American film noir directed by Anthony Mann
- Side Streets (1998 film), a Merchant Ivory film
- Sidestreet, a Canadian television drama series
- "Side Streets", a 2005 song by Saint Etienne from Tales from Turnpike House

== See also ==
- Side Street Ramblers, a barbershop quartet
