= Chord Busters =

Barbershop quartet

The Chord Busters
- Origin: Tulsa, Oklahoma
- Genres: Barbershop
- Years active: from 1940
- Past members: Norman T. "Doc" Enmier – tenor (from 1941); Bob Holbrook – lead; Bobby Greer – baritone; Tom Masengale – bass; Virgil Dow – tenor (1940–1941)

Chord Busters is a Barbershop quartet that won the 1941 SPEBSQSA international competition.

Preceded by Flat Foot Four	SPEBSQSA International Quartet Champions; 1941	Succeeded by Elastic Four
