= Schmitt Brothers =

Barbershop quartet

The Schmitt Brothers
- Origin: Two Rivers, Wisconsin
- Genres: Barbershop
- Years active: 1949–1983
- Past members: Joe Schmitt – tenor Fran Schmitt – lead Paul Schmitt – baritone Jim Schmitt – bass

Schmitt Brothers was a Barbershop quartet from Two Rivers, Wisconsin that won the 1951 SPEBSQSA international competition. The quartet consisted of four brothers: Joe, Paul, Francis and Jim Schmitt. They participated in 110 performances during their championship year, including appearances on the Ed Sullivan and Arthur Godfrey television programs.

After becoming active as teachers in district and international schools, the brothers received a reward for outstanding service to school music at the Wisconsin Music Educators Association Conference in 1980. The Schmitt Brothers Quartet performed together for 34 years, traveling more than three million miles and appearing in nearly 3,000 shows.

== Notes ==
Preceded by Buffalo Bills	SPEBSQSA International Quartet Champions; 1951	Succeeded by Four Teens
