= Masterpiece (quartet) =

Barbershop quartet

- Genres: Barbershop
- Members: Rob Menaker – tenor Patrick Haedtler – lead Alan Gordon – baritone Brett Littlefield – bass
- Past members: Mark Hale
- Website: masterpiecequartet.com

Masterpiece is the barbershop quartet that won the International Quartet Championship for 2013 at the Barbershop Harmony Society's annual international convention, in Toronto, Ontario. The quartet's preliminary qualifying score of 88.5% was the second highest among 2013's international competitors. The foursome placed third and fourth in the two preceding international contests, and won two CARA awards in 2013 prior to their international championship. Hailing from the Society's Far Western District, this quartet sings in the barbershop style with contemporary influences.

== Discography ==
- Nice & Easy (CD; 2012)
- Old Friends (CD; 2014)
- Let's Live It Up! (CD; 2016)

Preceded by Ringmasters	SPEBSQSA International Quartet Champions; 2013	Succeeded by Musical Island Boys
