= Orphans (quartet) =

American barbershop quartet

The Orphans
- Origin: Wichita, Kansas
- Genres: Barbershop
- Years active: early 1950s – 1955
- Past members: Bud Bigham – tenor Bob Groom – lead Pete Tyree – baritone Jay Bond – bass

The Orphans is a barbershop quartet that won the 1954 SPEBSQSA international competition.

Preceded by Vikings	SPEBSQSA International Quartet Champions; 1954	Succeeded by Four Hearsemen
