= Second Edition (quartet) =

Barbershop quartet

- Years active: 1986–92
- Members: Fred Farrell – tenor David Harrington – lead Doug Harrington – baritone Jamie Meyer – bass
- Website: Official site

Second Edition is the Barbershop quartet that won the 1989 SPEBSQSA international competition.

The Second Edition quartet was a second version of The Harrington Brothers. They later split, with David and Doug joining with bass Jamie Meyer and tenor Fred Farrell. They often performed with the Growing Girls, the Sweet Adelines quartet champions of 1989. The Bass of SE married the bass of GG, and the baritone of SE married the lead of GG.

David has also sung in other quartets like A Few Good Men. SE retired in the mid 1990s. David arranges music for quartets and choruses, while Doug coaches various music groups around the world, including Swinglish Mix. Until 2015, Doug directed the Stockholm-based chorus zero8, garnering the ensemble a 4th place bronze medal at the 2012 chorus competition in Portland, Oregon.

== Discography ==
- Change the World
- Second Edition (CD)
- 1 (CD)
- The Best of Two Worlds (cassette) with The Growing Girls
- The Thoroughbreds Present Solid Gold (CD) with Louisville Thoroughbreds, Bluegrass Student Union and Interstate Rivals

| Preceded by Chiefs of Staff | Barbershop Harmony Society International Quartet Champions; 1989 | Succeeded by Acoustix |
