= John D. Miller =

John D. Miller may refer to:

- John Miller (minister)
- John D. Miller (television executive)
- John D. Miller (murderer)
