= Gala Lads =

American barbershop quartet

The Gala Lads
- Origin: Alhambra, California
- Genres: Barbershop
- Past members: Dave Panther – tenor (to late 1960s); Tom Keehan – lead; Bill Cockrell – baritone; Gordie Lees – bass; Joe May – tenor (from late 1960s)

The Gala Lads is a barbershop quartet that won the 1962 SPEBSQSA international competition.

== Discography ==
- From The Top In Barbershop – You've Never Heard It So Good (1964; LP)

Preceded by The Suntones	SPEBSQSA International Quartet Champions; 1962	Succeeded by Town and Country Four
