= Lads of Enchantment =

Barbershop quartet

The Lads of Enchantment
- Genres: Barbershop
- Past members: Don Pitts – tenor; Dan Aycock – lead; Carl Wright – baritone; Gil Wallace – bass

The Lads of Enchantment is a barbershop quartet that won the 1957 SPEBSQSA international competition.

Preceded by The Confederates	SPEBSQSA International Quartet Champions; 1957	Succeeded by Gay Notes
