= Musical Island Boys =

Barbershop quartet from New Zealand

- Origin: Wellington, New Zealand
- Genres: Barbershop
- Members: Jeff Hunkin – tenor Marcellus Washburn – lead Will Hunkin – baritone Matt Gifford – bass
- Website: AIC entry

Musical Island Boys is the barbershop quartet that won the International Quartet Championship for 2014 at the Barbershop Harmony Society's annual international convention, in Las Vegas, Nevada. From Wellington, New Zealand, the quartet began in 2002 at Tawa College, and competed in its first international barbershop contest in 2004. They won the international collegiate contest in 2006 at Indianapolis, and won second-place silver medals in 2011, 2012, and 2013 international contests. Other awards include the New Zealand and Pan-Pacific Open Gold Medals at the 4th Pan Pacific Barbershop Convention in 2004, and second place in the International Open Barbershop Championships in 2011.

Bass singer Matt Gifford is self-described as "half Cook Island and half New Zealand Māori", lead singer Marcellus (Lusa) Washburn is from Samoa, and Jeff and Will Hunkin (tenor and baritone, respectively) are both half-Samoan and half-Niuean.

== Discography ==
- Musical Island Boys (CD; 2006)
- Once Upon a Time (CD; 2009)
- Dream (CD; 2013)
- Four (CD; 2015)

Preceded by Masterpiece	SPEBSQSA International Quartet Champions; 2014	Succeeded by Instant Classic
