= Four Renegades =

Barbershop quartet

The Four Renegades
- Origin: Illinois
- Genres: Barbershop
- Past members: Warren 'Buzz' Haeger – tenor; Ben Williams – lead (from 1963); Jim Foley – baritone; Tom Felgen – bass; Joe Sullivan – lead (to 1963)

The Four Renegades is a Barbershop quartet that won the 1965 SPEBSQSA international competition.

Preceded by Sidewinders	SPEBSQSA International Quartet Champions; 1965	Succeeded by Auto Towners
