= Boston Common (disambiguation) =

Boston Common is a public park.

Boston Common may also refer to:

- Boston Common (TV series)
- Boston Common (quartet), a barbershop quartet
- Boston Common, 8/17/71, an album by the Allman Brothers Band
