= Rural Route 4 =

Barbershop quartet

- Years active: 1971–94
- Members: Don Kahl – tenor Calvin Yoder – lead Jim Bagby – baritone Willard Yoder – bass
- Past members: Rufus Kenagy – baritone Everett Roth – tenor

Rural Route 4 is the Missouri-based barbershop quartet that won the 1986 SPEBSQSA international competition. They are known for their signature costumes of matching overalls in keeping with the rural theme of their group in venues where formal attire is expected.

Calvin's son, Wes Yoder, later replaced Don as the group's tenor until their formal retirement in 1994.

== Discography ==
- My Life, My Love, My Song, cassette, CD; 1992
- Friends and Relatives, LP, cassette; 1987
- Saturday Night Sunday Mornin', LP, cassette; 1985
- Friends and Relatives, CD; 1987

Preceded by The New Tradition	Barbershop Harmony Society International Quartet Champions; 1986	Succeeded by Interstate Rivals
