= Instant Classic =

American barbershop quartet

- Origin: Indianapolis, Indiana
- Genres: Barbershop
- Members: David Zimmerman – tenor Theo Hicks – lead Kohl Kitzmiller – baritone Kyle Kitzmiller – bass
- Website: instantclassicquartet.com

Instant Classic is an American barbershop quartet from Indianapolis, Indiana, comprising David Zimmerman, Theo Hicks, Kohl Kitzmiller and Kyle Kitzmiller.

It won the 2015 International Quartet Championship at the Barbershop Harmony Society's annual international convention, held that year in Pittsburgh, Pennsylvania.

== Discography ==
- Instant Classic (CD; 2014)
- Instant Classic: Start of Something Big (CD; 2016)
- Instant Classic: Simple Gifts (CD; 2019)
- Instant Classic: An Icy Holiday EP (Recording; 2020)

Preceded by Musical Island Boys	SPEBSQSA International Quartet Champions; 2015	Succeeded by Forefront
