= Flat Foot Four =

Barbershop quartet

The Flat Foot Four
- Origin: Oklahoma City, Oklahoma
- Genres: Barbershop
- Years active: from 1923
- Past members: Johnny Whalen – tenor; Britt Stegal – lead; Red Elliot – baritone (from 1940); Sam Barnes – bass; Frank Sheppard – original lead; Roland Cargill – original baritone; Bill Parrish – original bass; Granville Scanland – baritone in 1939; Paul (Sleepy) Chapman – bass 1936–1938 (wrote the popular barbershop song "Oh Joe"

The Flat Foot Four is a Barbershop quartet that won the 1940 SPEBSQSA international competition. The victorious line-up was the following:

- Johnny Whalen, tenor
- Britt Stegall, lead
- Sam Barnes, bass
- Red Elliott, baritone

| Preceded by Bartlesville Barflies | SPEBSQSA International Quartet Champions; 1940 | Succeeded by Chord Busters |
