= Four Hearsemen =

Barbershop quartet

The Four Hearsemen
- Also known as: The Blackburn-Shaw Quartet (1934–1951)
- Origin: Amarillo, Texas
- Genres: Barbershop
- Years active: 1934 – early 1940s; from 1945
- Past members: Wendell Heiny – tenor (from 1935); Deane Watson – lead (from 1952); Dwight Elliott – baritone; Dick Gifford – bass (from 1952); Paul Ellis – lead (to 1951); Al Autrey – lead (1951–1952); Willard Grantham – bass (to 1949); Jim Bob Nance – bass (1949–1952)

The Four Hearsemen was a barbershop quartet from Amarillo, Texas, that won the 1955 SPEBSQSA international competition.

Preceded by Orphans	SPEBSQSA International Quartet Champions; 1955	Succeeded by The Confederates
