= Pittsburghers =

Barbershop quartet

The Pittsburghers
- Also known as: Allen Club Four (to 1948); Pittsburgh Four (after 1965)
- Genres: Barbershop
- Years active: 1938–1980s
- Past members: Harry Conte – tenor (to 1955); Tom Palamone – lead (tenor from 1955); John "Jiggs" Ward – baritone (1946–65); Bill Conway – bass (1947–1950s); Anthony "Zebo" DiPerro – bari (to 1946); Jack Elder – bari (from 1965); "Turp" Marcanello – bass (to 1947); Dutch Miller – bass (1950s–1963); Nick Kason – bass (from 1963); Tom O'Malley – lead (from 1955)

The Pittsburghers is a Barbershop quartet that won the 1948 SPEBSQSA international competition.

Preceded by Doctors of Harmony	SPEBSQSA International Quartet Champions; 1948	Succeeded by Mid States Four
