= Happiness Emporium =

Barbershop quartet

- Also known as: GoodNews Gospel Quartet
- Origin: Minnesota
- Genres: Barbershop, Gospel
- Years active: 1972–2013
- Members: Bob Dowma – tenor Rod Johnson – lead Rick Anderson – baritone Jim Foy – bass
- Past members: Bob Spong – baritone Richard Treptow – baritone
- Website: Official site

Happiness Emporium is a Barbershop quartet that won the 1975 SPEBSQSA international competition.

The quartet first sang together in 1972. After Bob Spong left the quartet in 1983, Dick Treptow sang baritone until 1987, when Rick Anderson took the part.

== Discography ==
- Right from the Start (CD)
- Rise 'n Shine (LP, CD)
- Now & Then (LP, CD)
- Oh Lord, It's Hard to Be Humble (CD)
- Control Yourself (LP, CD)
- That's Entertainment! (LP, cassette, CD)
- That's Life! (cassette, CD)
- Beneath the Cross (cassette, CD)
- Beneath the Cross II (CD)
- Golden Gospel (CD)
- Golden Gospel II (CD)
- Double Feature (DVD)
- Time Flies (CD)

Preceded by Regents	SPEBSQSA International Quartet Champions; 1975	Succeeded by Innsiders
