= Gentlemen's Agreement (quartet) =

Barbershop quartet

- Genres: Barbershop
- Years active: 1969 – mid-1980s
- Past members: Al Rehkop – tenor; Drayton Justus – lead; Glenn Van Tassel – baritone (to about 1973); Bob Whitledge – bass; Greg Backwell – baritone (from about 1973)
- Website: Official site

Gentlemen's Agreement is a Barbershop quartet that won the 1971 SPEBSQSA international competition. Members Al Rehkop and Glenn Van Tassel had also won in the 1966 contest with the Auto Towners quartet; they were joined as gold medalists by Bob Whitledge and Drayton Justus. The group went on to perform with Bob Hope's USO tour of Vietnam.

Later lineups included Greg Backwell, Jim Gross, and Phil Foote. The group announced their retirement in 1976, but would reform a few more times over the next decade.

Preceded by Oriole Four	SPEBSQSA International Quartet Champions; 1971	Succeeded by Golden Staters
