= Innsiders =

Barbershop quartet

The Innsiders
- Origin: Houston, Texas
- Genres: Barbershop
- Years active: from 1967
- Past members: Mike Cox – tenor; John Devine – lead; Guy McShan – baritone; Tom Pearson – bass; John Wiggs – original tenor; Dick Oury – original bass

The Innsiders is the Barbershop quartet that won the 1976 SPEBSQSA international competition.

Preceded by Happiness Emporium	SPEBSQSA International Quartet Champions; 1976	Succeeded by Most Happy Fellows
