= Forefront =

Forefront may refer to:

- Microsoft Forefront
- ForeFront Records
- Forefront (quartet), 2016 international singing contest winner
- Forefront VR video game by Triangle Factory
