= Bartlesville Barflies =

Barbershop quartet

The Bartlesville Barflies
- Also known as: Bartlesville American Legion Minstrel Quartet (to 1938)
- Origin: Bartlesville, Oklahoma
- Genres: Barbershop
- Years active: from 1937
- Past members: George McCaslin – tenor Harry Hall – lead Bob Durand – baritone Herman Kaiser – bass

The Bartlesville Barflies was a Barbershop quartet from Bartlesville, Oklahoma that won the 1939 SPEBSQSA original international competition. The victorious line-up was the following:

- Tenor: George McCaslin
- Lead: Harry Hall
- Bass: Herman Kaiser
- Baritone: Bob Durand

Preceded by no preceding quartet	SPEBSQSA International Quartet Champions; 1939	Succeeded by Flat Foot Four
