= Nightlife (quartet) =

Barbershop quartet

- Genres: Barbershop
- Members: Rob Menaker – tenor John Sasine – lead Jeff Baker – baritone Brett Littlefield – bass
- Website: Official site

Nightlife are a barbershop quartet that won the BHS International Quartet competition in 1996.

== Members ==
- Tenor: Rob Menaker
- Lead: John Sasine
- Baritone: Jeff Baker
- Bass: Brett Littlefield

Nightlife is a barbershop quartet and winner of the 1996 International Championship from the Society for the Preservation and Encouragement of Barbershop Quartet Singing in America, Inc.

Starting from similar roots that flourished in the five-time world champion men's chorus, the Masters of Harmony, Nightlife is only the second international quartet champion in barbershop history to win gold alongside its parent chorus, which attained the same triumph on the same stage in the same year.

Since then, Nightlife has traveled all over America and abroad, playing mainly in the barbershop style.

Preceded by Marquis	SPEBSQSA International Quartet Champions; 1996	Succeeded by Yesteryear
