= Golden Staters =

Barbershop quartet

The Golden Staters
- Genres: Barbershop
- Years active: from December 1960
- Past members: Gary Harding – tenor; Milt Christensen – lead (from 1970); Jack Harding – baritone; Mike Senter – bass; Jack Lang – original tenor; Joe Rook – original lead; Buddy Yarnell – original baritone

The Golden Staters is a Barbershop quartet that won the 1972 SPEBSQSA international competition.

== Members ==
- Tenor: Gary Harding
- Lead: Milt Christensen
- Bass: Mike Senter
- Baritone: Jack Harding

| Preceded by Gentlemen's Agreement | SPEBSQSA International Quartet Champions; 1972 | Succeeded by Dealer's Choice |
