= The Suntones =

Barbershop quartet

- Origin: Florida
- Genres: Barbershop
- Past members: Gene Cokeroft – tenor; Bob Franklin – lead (to 1980); Harlan Wilson – baritone (since before 1961); Bill Cain – bass; Bill Wyatt – baritone (before 1961); Drayton Justus – lead (from 1980)

The Suntones were a barbershop quartet from Miami, Florida, USA, and the 1961 SPEBSQSA international champions. At the time it won gold, the quartet featured Gene Cokeroft as tenor, Bob Franklin as lead, Harlan Wilson as baritone, and Bill Cain as bass.

The Suntones are notable among the barbershop community because they were one of the first quartets to perform show tunes and make use of hand-held microphones.

== History ==
After winning the 1961 SPEBSQSA championship, the Suntones became more active touring, performing and recording. In 1966, Jackie Gleason moved his popular TV variety show to Miami and hired the Suntones to sing both as a barbershop quartet and as backing singers.

In addition to barbershop standards, the Suntones introduced many contemporary songs into their performances including medleys of songs from Broadway musicals (West Side Story, Fiddler on the Roof, The Sound of Music, etc.) arranged by Walter Latzko.

In 1979, Bob Franklin left the group, and Drayton Justus became the new lead singer. The group's "final" performance was in early 1985 in Montclair, New Jersey, during a special tribute to arranger Walter Latzko. Bill Cain died in 2004, but Franklin later returned to join Cokeroft, Harlan Wilson, and Todd Wilson (Harlan's son) on bass for limited performances.

== Discography ==
=== Studio recordings ===
Originally released on Sunrise Records:

- A Touch of Gold (1962)
- Afterglow (1966)
- Watch What Happens (1967)
- Somewhere (1971)
- Keep America Singing (1972)
- A Touch of Old (1972)
- Fiddler (1973)
- As Time Goes By (1976)
- Where is Love (1978)
- My Fair Lady (1982)

=== Live recordings ===
- A Touch of Live (2003) – from a 1972 performance

=== Compilations ===
- Suntones (1992) AIC Masterworks Series – 1 CD
- The Complete Works (1999) AIC – 5-CD boxed set
  - Volume 1 (1962–66)
  - Volume 2 (1967–71)
  - Volume 3 (1972)
  - Volume 4 (1973–76)
  - Volume 5 (1978–82)

Preceded by Evans Quartet	SPEBSQSA International Quartet Champions; 1961	Succeeded by Gala Lads
