= Western Continentals =

Barbershop quartet

- Genres: Barbershop
- Years active: 1964–1972, 1973–mid-1970s, 1977–1979
- Past members: Al Mau – tenor (1965–1971, from 1973); Ted Bradshaw – lead; Paul Graham – baritone; Phil Foote – bass (from 1967); Curt Kimball tenor (to 1965); Terry Diedrich – bass (to 1967); Frank Friedemann – tenor (from 1971 to 1973)

Western Continentals is a Barbershop quartet that won the 1968 SPEBSQSA international competition.

Preceded by Four Statesmen	SPEBSQSA International Quartet Champions; 1968	Succeeded by Mark IV
