= Side Street Ramblers =

Barbershop quartet

- Members: Keith Houts – tenor Brian Beck – lead Dennis Malone – baritone Earl Hagn – bass
- Past members: Bill Thornton – lead Jim Law – lead

Side Street Ramblers is a Dallas-based Barbershop quartet that won the 1983 SPEBSQSA international competition in Seattle.

== Discography ==
- Seems Like Yesterday LP, cassette
- Side Street Ramblers LP, cassette
- Encore!, CD

They also appear on Here's to The Winners (LP, cassette, 8-track) with the Vocal Majority.

Preceded by Classic Collection	Barbershop Harmony Society International Quartet Champions; 1983	Succeeded by The Rapscallions
