= The Ritz (quartet) =

Barbershop quartet

- Years active: 1984–2004
- Members: Jim Shisler – tenor Doug 'Nic' Nichol – lead Donald J. "DJ" Hiner – baritone Ben Ayling – bass
- Website: Official site

The Ritz is a barbershop quartet from the Johnny Appleseed District of the Barbershop Harmony Society. Each member of the quartet was a vocal music teacher at the high school or university level. After coming in fourth at the San Francisco convention in 1990, the quartet won the international championship in Louisville in 1991.

The quartet has traveled internationally and has appeared on two PBS specials, Keep America Singing (in 1994) and World's Largest Concert (in 1996).

== Discography ==
- Puttin' On The Ritz (Interactive CD; 2002)
- Rare Times (CD; 1997)
- On Moonlight Bay (CD, cassette; 1995)
- Swingin' on a Star (CD, cassette; 1994)
- Old Songs Are Just Like Old Friends (CD; 1992)
- I'm Beginning to See the Light (CD; 1991)
- The Most Wonderful Time of the Year (CD, cassette)
- The Ritz Anthology (CD; includes the previous four)
- The Ritz (cassette)

They also appear on First Recording (CD, cassette) with the Pride of Toledo Chorus.

Preceded by Acoustix	Barbershop Harmony Society International Quartet Champions; 1991	Succeeded by Keepsake
