= Tawa College =

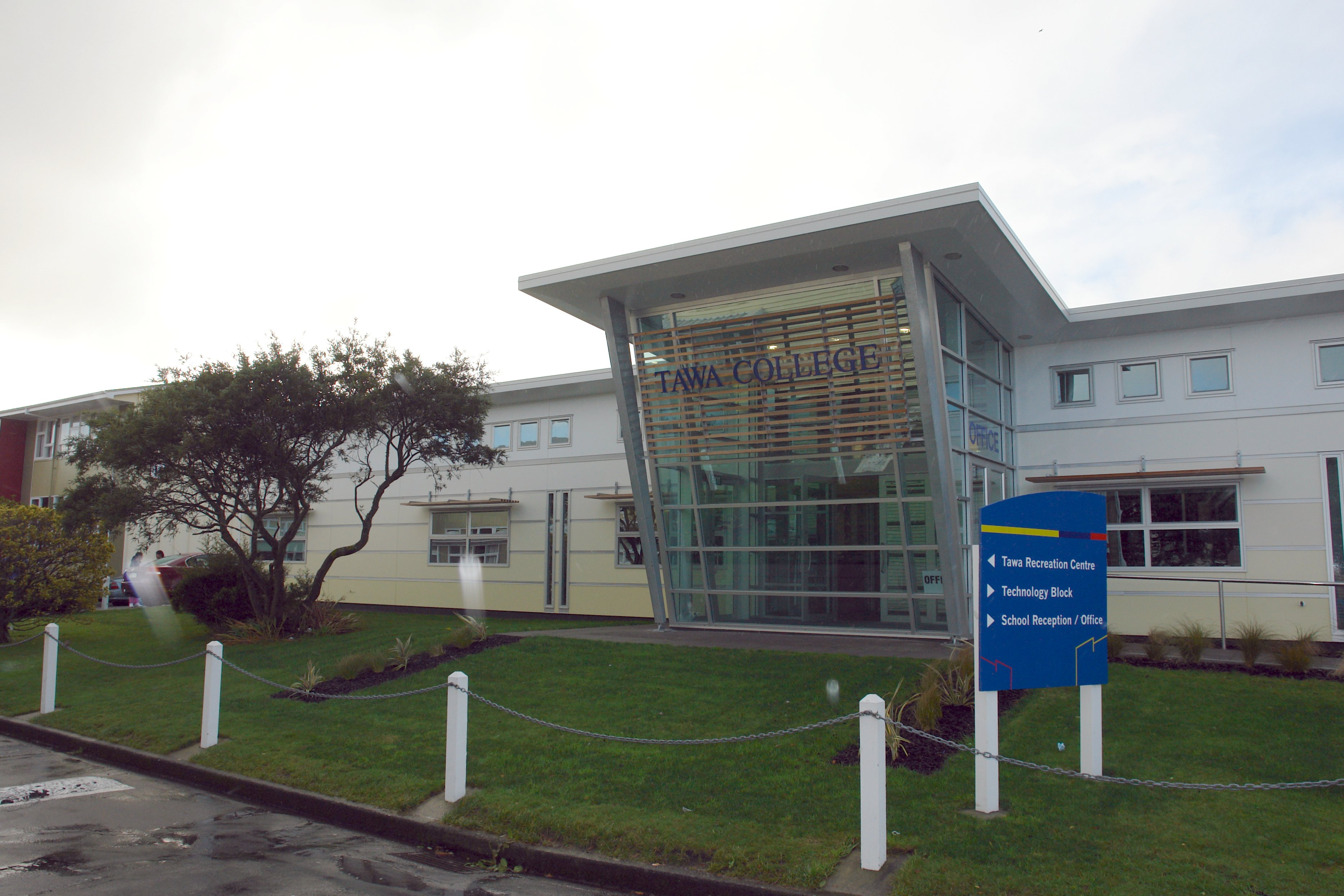

Location
- Duncan St, Tawa; Wellington; New Zealand; 41.1650°S 174.8318°E

Information
- Type: State secondary
- Motto: Do Justly; Enter to learn, depart to serve
- Established: 1961
- Ministry of Education Institution no.: 257
- Principal: Andrew Savage
- Grades: 9–13
- Gender: Coeducational
- Enrolment: 1,039 (July 2026)
- Website: tawacollege.school.nz e2learn.school.nz

Tawa College is a state coeducational secondary school located in Tawa, Wellington, New Zealand. The school opened in 1961, and primarily serves students in Tawa and the surrounding suburbs. A total of 1,039 students from Years 9 to 13 attend the school as of July 2026.

== History ==
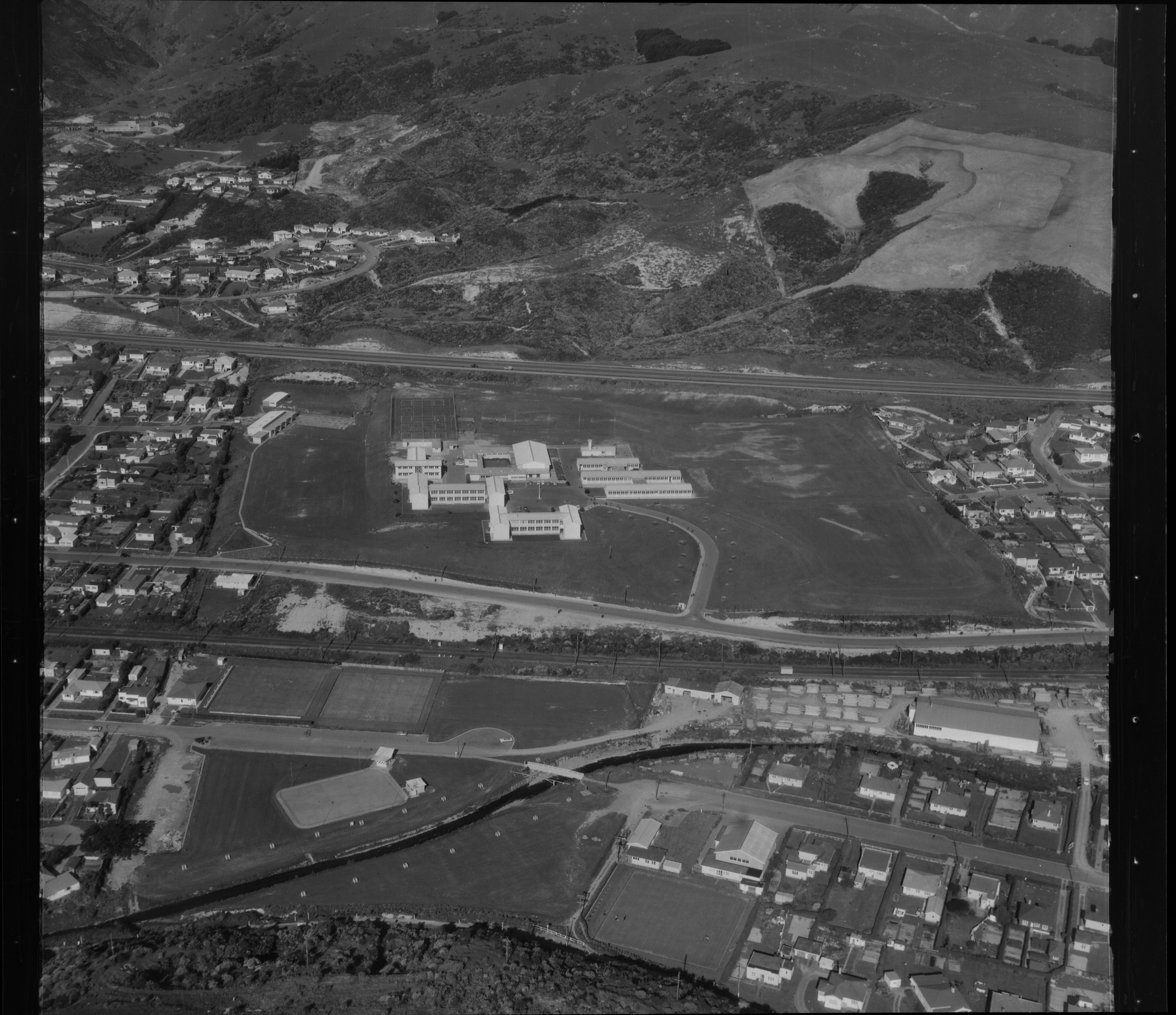
Tawa College, October 1965.

Tawa College opened in February 1961.

== Demographics ==
At the November 2018 Education Review Office (ERO) review, Tawa College had 1175 students enrolled, including 19 international students. 52 percent of students were male and 48 percent were female. 50 percent of students identified as European New Zealanders (Pākehā), 17 percent identified as Māori, 14 percent as Pasifika, and 20 percent as another ethnicity.

As of 2026, Tawa College has an Equity Index of 440, placing it amongst schools whose students have below average socioeconomic barriers to achievement (roughly equivalent to decile 7 under the former socio-economic decile system).

== Blocks ==
Tawa College currently has 10 classroom blocks: A Block, B Block, C Block, D Block, E Block, F Block, H Block, J Block, S Block, and T Block.

Tawa College used to have two more blocks: G and K blocks, these are both out of use and scheduled for demolition. K block is being demolished for its high-risk asbestos, and G block for the extension of State Highway one, which is adjacent to it.

Like many New Zealand secondary schools of the era, the school was constructed to the Nelson Two-Storey standard plan, distinguished by its two-storey H-shaped classroom blocks. Tawa College has three of these blocks: B block, C block, and D block.

A Block is the foods, dance, woodwork and art block (along with Te Reo Māori in the PTA center). B Block is home to social studies classes as well as: psychology, history, geography, science and more. C Block is home to english, science, computer labs and more. D Block's classrooms includes: English, maths, maths offices, science and more. E Block is the language block with Japanese and French. F Block is the drama block with a miniature theatre which was recently revamped with the help from Nick Brown, HOD of Drama and Dance. G Block is a one story block which spans around the netball and basketball courts with all sorts of classrooms. H Block is the music block with: three studios, two music classrooms, a music office, a big music space, the school hall. J Block is the science block with two science classrooms. K Block is the retired kindergarten recently purchased by Tawa College and is currently used if there are no available classrooms. S Block is the special learning block for people with special learning needs.

== Uniform ==
The traditional colours of Tawa College are blue, red and yellow, as seen in the school uniform, sports strips and crest. The uniform skirt for the girls is a kilt made of Duncan tartan. The college has special permission from the Scottish clan, to whom the tartan belongs (as intellectual property), to use the tartan in its uniform.

In 2024, Tawa College released a statement which says Year 13 students must be in full school uniform from 2025. In the past, Year 13 students wore non-uniform, or mufti. In the same statement, Tawa College updated their uniform requirements for all students, and are on a transition period to make the tie, blazer, and formal pants/skirt part of the daily uniform, instead of just for special occasions/events.

== Tawa Recreation Centre ==
The Tawa Recreation Centre (informally known as "the rec centre") is a joint venture between Tawa College and the Wellington City Council. The facility contains two gymnasiums, two sets of male and female changing rooms, a large foyer area, P.E equipment sheds, a Wellington City Council Office and reception area, P.E department offices, and a classroom on the mezzanine.

== Successes ==
The school is well known for its achievements in the arts, notably singing, including several national and international barbershop quartet and chorus champions, such as the Musical Island Boys (national barbershop champions, 2004; international collegiate quartet champions, 2006; Barbershop Harmony Society International Quartet Champions, 2014). Their auditioned chamber choir Blue Notes has also received national success, including their achievements at the annual The Big Sing choral festival, where they've received multiple gold awards.

They also have a big reputation due to their wrestling team, TCW, who have been twice national champions.

In 2009, the principal at the time, Mr Lucas, and approximately 38 year 13 chemistry students beat the Guinness world record for the most hours of consecutive teaching with their 28-hour chemistry teach-a-thon. This was put together as a fundraiser for World Vision, and through it they raised over $3,000.

== Notable alumni ==
Notable alumni include:

- Jerry Collins – All Blacks captain
- Sophie Devine – White Ferns captain
- Taito Phillip Field – former Member of Parliament
- Mark Gillespie – Black Cap
- Blair Hilton – national field hockey representative and 2010 Commonwealth Games bronze medallist
- Elizabeth Knox – New Zealand writer
- Nick Leggett – fourth Mayor of Porirua
- Murray Mexted – rugby union commentator, former All Black
- Kerry Prendergast – former Mayor of Wellington
- Lee Tamahori – film director
- Louis Fenton – former member of Wellington Phoenix Football Club, All Whites
- Amelia Kerr – international cricketer, granddaughter of Bruce Murray
- Jess Kerr – international cricketer, granddaughter of Bruce Murray
- Tony Backhouse – musician and composer
- Musical Island Boys – 2014 Barbershop Harmony Society International Quartet Champions
- CJ Bott - New Zealand Professional Footballer
- Kyle Preston - New Zealand Rugby Union Player

== Principals ==
- 1961–66 – Alan Mackie
- 1966–81 – Eric Flaws
- 1981–89 – Brian Walker
- 1989–2002 – Bruce Murray
- 2002–2021 – Murray Lucas
- 2022–present – Andrew Savage
