= The Confederates =

Barbershop quartet

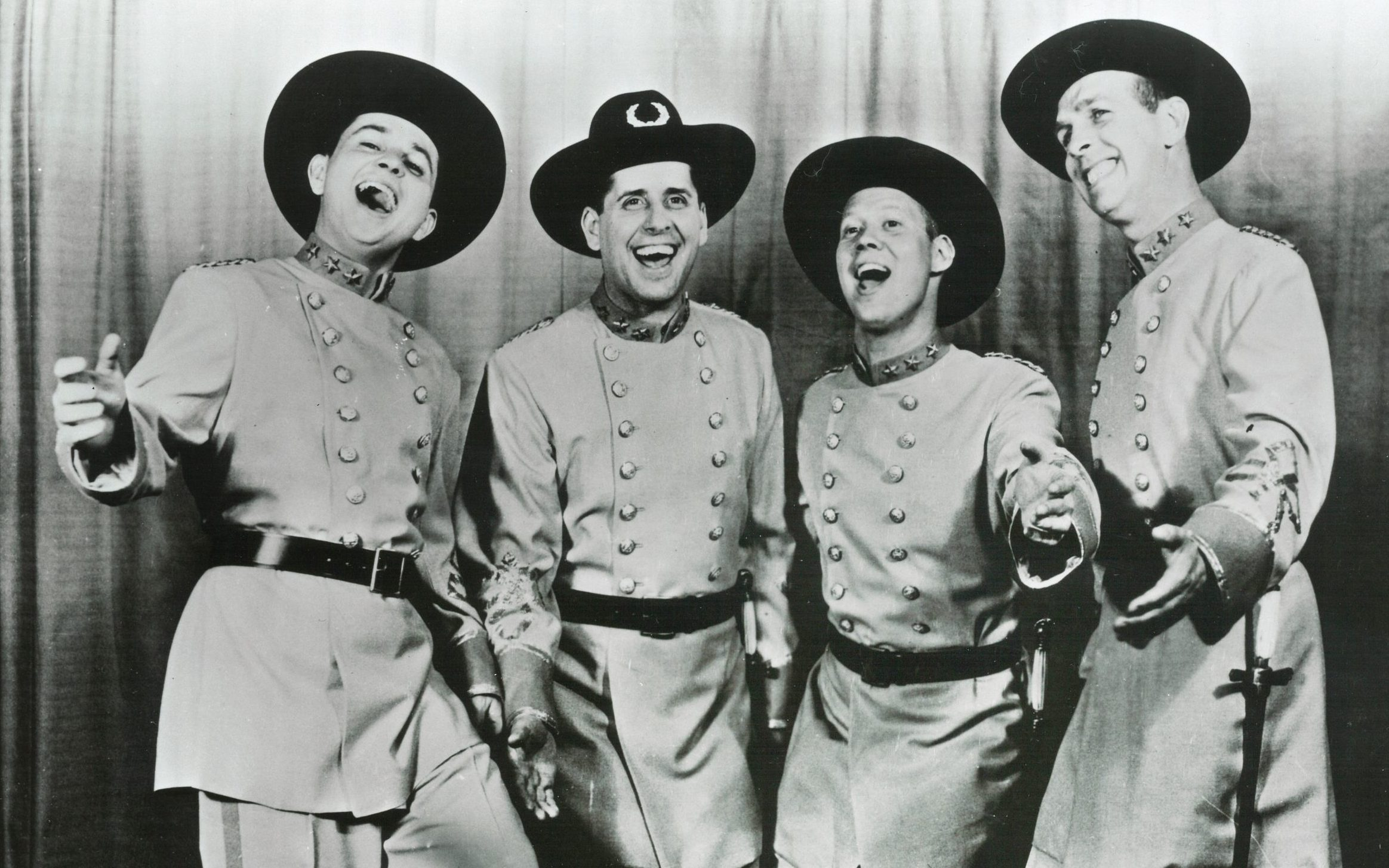

Background information
- Origin: Memphis, Tennessee
- Genres: Barbershop
- Years active: 1953–1960, 1961–1969
- Past members: George Evans – tenor; Dave LaBonte – lead; Bill "Buz" Busby – baritone; Wally Singleton – bass

The Confederates were a barbershop quartet that performed in the 1950s and 1960s.

The group formed in September 1953 at a SPEBSQSA chapter meeting in Memphis, Tennessee. They consisted of:

- George Evans – tenor
- Dave LaBonte – lead
- Bill "Buz" Busby – baritone
- Wally Singleton – bass

The Confederates took first place in the 1956 SPEBSQSA International Quartet Championship after finishing second the year before. They were notable not only for their championship-caliber harmonies, but also for performing in Confederate officer uniforms.

The group stopped performing in 1969.

== Discography ==
- Confederate Encores in Hi-Fi (1963; LP)

== Notable songs ==
- "Save Your Confederate Money Boys, The South Shall Rise Again"
- "Creole Cutie"
- "Down Where the South Begins"
- "Chloe"
- "Red Head"
- "A Nightingale Sang in Berkeley Square"

Preceded by Four Hearsemen	SPEBSQSA International Quartet Champions; 1956	Succeeded by Lads of Enchantment
