= Four Teens =

The Four Teens
- Origin: Eau Claire, Wisconsin
- Genres: Barbershop
- Years active: 1949–1955
- Past members: John Steinmetz – tenor Jim Chinnock – lead Don Cahall – bass Don Lamont – baritone Gene Rehberg – bass (1949–50)

The Four Teens barbershop quartet were the Barbershop Harmony Society's SPEBSQSA 1952 international champions.

Preceded by Schmitt Brothers	SPEBSQSA International Quartet Champions; 1952	Succeeded by Vikings
