= MARK IV (Barbershop) =

Barbershop quartet

Mark IV
- Genres: Barbershop
- Members: Franklin Spears – tenor; Al Koberstein – lead; Dale Deiser – baritone; Morris "Mo" Rector – bass (when Crawford was away on business); C.O. Crawford – bass

Mark IV is a Barbershop quartet that won the 1969 SPEBSQSA international competition.

== Discography ==
- Mark IV – AIC Masterworks CD (CD)

Preceded by Western Continentals	SPEBSQSA International Quartet Champions; 1969	Succeeded by Oriole Four
