= John D. Miller (television executive) =

American television executive (born 1950)

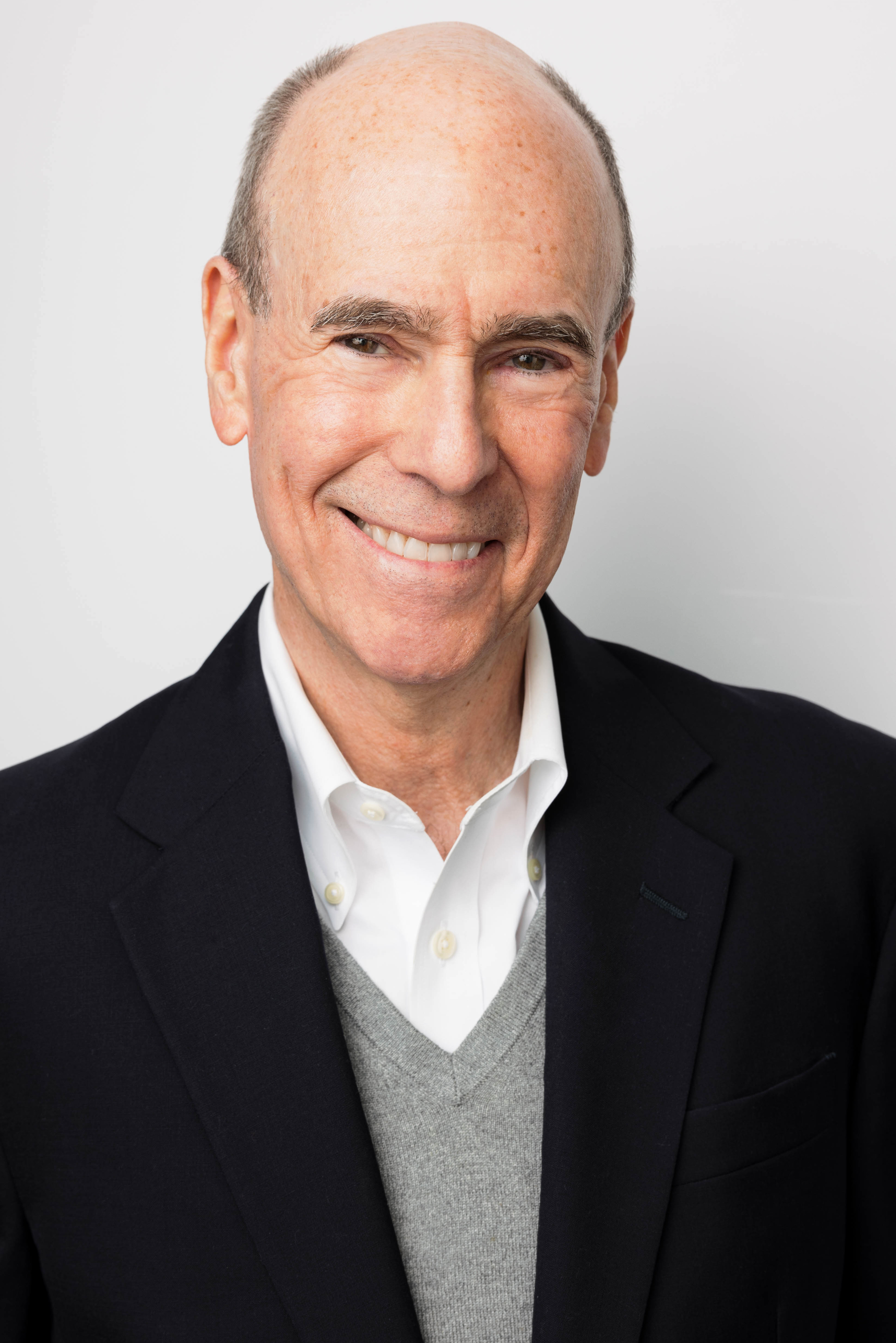
John D. Miller in 2023

John Douglas Miller (born October 7, 1950) is a retired television advertising and marketing executive who led the marketing of the National Broadcasting Company (NBC) for decades. He was chief marketing officer (CMO) of NBCUniversal (NBCU), the NBC Sports Group, and NBC Olympics; chaired the NBCU Marketing Council; co-founded the NBC Agency; and oversaw the network's joint marketing collaborative process known as Symphony. He was part of the team behind the successful 'Must See TV' promotional campaign and the 'NBC 2000' promotional campaign, which changed television promoting and marketing and defined industry practices. He marketed renowned series including Friends, Seinfeld, ER and others, as well as 12 NBC Olympic broadcasts and other sports events. He retired in 2022 after 50 years in the broadcast media industry, 43 of which were with NBC.

Miller was recognized by his peers in the entertainment industry with numerous awards for promotion, advertising and marketing, and received nine Emmy Awards, including one for an outstanding commercial.

He has served on the advisory board for the Newhouse School of Public Communications at Syracuse University, and as a faculty lecturer at the Heinz College at Carnegie Mellon University, where he was an adjunct professor in the Master of Entertainment Industry Management program. Married to Sharon Worsham Miller since 1981, the couple has four sons. Miller is a two-time international barbershop quartet champion.

== Early life and education ==
John Douglas Miller was born on October 7, 1950, in Chicago, Illinois; his parents were musicians. After high school, he enrolled as a theater major at Kansas University. Switching from acting to television journalism, he graduated magna cum laude with a bachelor's degree in public communications from Newhouse School of Public Communications at Syracuse University in 1972.

== Career ==
=== 1972–1982: Freelance, CBS and NBC ===
In Chicago, Miller began doing freelance advertising work in 1972. In 1973, he joined WMAQ-TV, an owned-and-operated Chicago affiliate of NBC as a production assistant, quickly becoming an associate producer and then on-air promotion director, where he enjoyed the creative freedom and "getting shows launched". The CBS station in Chicago, WBBM-TV, noticed his work and Miller felt it was time for a change; he was hired by WBBM in 1976 and by 1978 was managing promotions for them.

In 1980, Miller was hired by Steve Sohmer to move to the CBS network in Los Angeles as the director of affiliate marketing for CBS-TV, West Coast. Miller described Sohmer as his mentor and tutor; and says he learned from Sohmer to pay attention to detail while maintaining focus on big issues—what Sohmer called, "do a million little things right". He compared working with Sohmer to getting a master's degree, saying "I learned a lot from his successes as well as his failures; he's a bigger-than-life personality."

In July 1981 Miller became the head of advertising and promotion for CBS News in New York during a CBS transition that he described as a "trying year". Walter Cronkite had just left and was replaced by Dan Rather. Miller came into an environment where promotion was of lesser importance, and it changed to "one that was given higher visibility".

=== 1982–1990: NBC advertising and promotion ===
Miller returned to NBC in August 1982 as vice president of affiliate promoting on the West Coast; when Sohmer moved to NBC, he brought Miller with him. At the time, NBC was the third-rated network. As Miller described NBC then, it was a "dismal third place", and the early years were "depressing", but as years in which he learned valuable lessons. He remembers the lowest point in 1983, when all nine new shows of the season did not survive to mid-season. By 1984, The Cosby Show gave NBC a chance in a prime-time ratings contest.

When Sohmer left NBC for Columbia Pictures in 1985, NBC realigned its executive staff. Miller was promoted to vice president of advertising and promotion. The Hollywood Reporter wrote that in his new role, Miller "in effect has moved from chief operating officer to CEO of the advertising and promotion department". By then NBC was no longer straining in third place in the ratings and had a shot at first place, and Miller sought to use the network's own air time for promotions, including of NBC's older shows.

In 1989, Miller was named a senior vice president in the entertainment division. In the four years since he took over from Sohmer, the business of network promoting had changed to include new forms of promotion like direct mail and promotional videocassettes; a Broadcasting magazine article summarized Miller's approach to marketing and advertising: "After having spent so much time performing before audiences in barber shop quartets, and coming from family with a performance background, it's not surprising that Miller's philosophy toward promotion contains a strong element of showmanship with no reluctance for taking chances."

=== 1990–1999: NBC executive vice president ===
Miller relocated from Burbank to New York in January 1990 when NBC Television named him executive vice president (EVP) of marketing, in charge of all marketing for the NBC network including affiliates and the entertainment, news and sports divisions. A 1990 Channels Magazine article said there was no position in the other major networks (ABC, CBS or Fox) where one person held an equivalent amount of marketing management oversight or responsibility, and that Miller handled "one of the busiest jobs in television" with "consistent outward calm". NBC's consolidation of all marketing efforts under one person was praised by its competitors, and Miller was described as "maintain[ing] his cool" even with frequent bi-coastal travel and a demanding job, earning "respect from his peers".

In July 1991, he relocated back to the West Coast when a new position was created in the NBC Entertainment division, and he took on the additional role of EVP of daytime and children's programming. In May 1993, event programming was added to his responsibilities and he was named NBC EVP for advertising and promotion, resulting in six promotions between 1982 and 1993.

In 1995, Miller and Vince Manze (then the senior vice president of advertising and promotion for NBC) were named as the Promax Marketers of the Year, and were called the "dynamic duo of NBC promos" by Susan Karlin in an Electronic Media feature. She wrote that they "replumed the network's peacock logo, themed its comedy nights and devised an unprecedented way of hooking viewers". Karlin describes these promotional efforts as part of the vision of the president of NBC West Coast at the time, Don Ohlmeyer, to "incorporate all network and affiliate programing and identities under one NBC brand name". In 1995, Ohlmeyer described Miller and Manze as "tireless in their attention to detail", able to "attract, keep and inspire talented people", and said that "Instead of bickering, they listen to each other", comparing their relationship to a good marriage.

Miller and Manze used artwork from well-known artists to publicize the revamping of the dated NBC peacock logo, along with promotional spots using celebrities and other gimmicks such as a Jurassic Park peacock. Karlin said they "elevated theatricals to 'event programming'", and identified three components of their successful re-branding of NBC: these "promotional gimmicks", the 'Must See TV' advertising campaign for NBC primetime, and the 'NBC 2000' campaign.

==== Must See TV ====
The 'Must See TV' campaign first aired in 1993 after Ohlmeyer moved most of NBC's top shows to Thursday night. (Note: Schneider (2010) says the campaign first aired in 1993; Madkour (2014) calls it a campaign from the 1980s and 1990s.) Miller and Manze oversaw the campaign. According to Miller, after Ohlmeyer asked for a campaign around the Thursday night programming, "One guy on our team said 'Must See TV,' and we said that's good—it rhymes, and we went with it." Michael Schneider wrote in a 2010 Variety magazine article that the campaign was "one of the most well-known TV slogans of all time".

Miller and Manze were the "team behind the Thursday-night phenomenon" according to a 2007 Ad Age article by Claire Atkinson. The Daily Variety stated they are "known for creating and executing" the promotional campaign to enhance viewership that came to be a brand identity for all of NBC's programming. Karlin says 'Must See TV' created a "unifying theme" for programming on Tuesday and Thursday nights by branding evenings of adult comedy. Abraham Madkour said it was a "pop culture slogan for the network's successful prime-time programming" in a 2014 Sports Business Journal article. The Sports Business Journal called Miller the "inspiration behind NBC's famous 'Must See TV' tag line", and a 2011 NBC press release credited him as the creator of 'Must See TV'.

==== NBC 2000 ====
The NBC 2000 campaign launched by Miller and Manze was described by Daily Variety as "another initiative that would change the way the networks programmed primetime"; it created "seamless" transitions from one show to the next, aiming to retain viewers and prevent "audience fallout" between shows. Miller and Manze began by having the credits at the end of comedy shows run over bloopers. Commercial breaks between shows were replaced by additional commercials within the show after the "viewer is hooked", according to Karlin, who stated that the campaign received "the most attention" and increased NBC's viewer retention between shows. Credits at the end of the show were run on a split screen, with promotional entertainment run opposite the credits. Miller quipped that the cost of NBC 2000 was "less than the defense budget".

Schneider stated in 2010 that the NBC 2000 campaign "became standard industry practice"; within a year, he said "every other network emulated the move".

=== 1999–2010: The NBC Agency and NBCUniversal Marketing Council ===
In 1999, Miller was named president of NBC advertising and promotion at a time when, according to Promax, "NBC was firmly number-one in primetime". The same year, he and Manze founded the NBC Agency, described by Nellie Andreeva of Deadline magazine as the "television industry's first full-service advertising agency".

Monica Gullon wrote in Ad Age that Miller and Manze, as co-presidents of the NBC Agency, helped convince the cast of Friends to return for another year with a promotion that earned for NBC an Entertainment Marketer of the Year award. Gullon states that Miller and Manze were responsible for revitalizing the show in what was assumed to be its last year, making it the number one network TV show in 2002. In the Friends promotional spots, they changed what Gullon called their "trademark wisecracking" promotional style that "emphasized comedic situations rather than the story line" and focused instead on "building up life-changing episodes" in an emotional story line, with music by Enya.

In 2004, with the merger of NBC and Universal, Miller became CMO of the NBCU Television Group managing promotional and marketing efforts across all divisions of NBCU TV Group. (Note: According to Andreeva, these 17 divisions included "Universal Media Studios, NBC Uni TV Distribution, NBC Entertainment, NBC News, NBC Sports, Telemundo, Bravo, USA Network, Syfy, Oxygen, MSNBC, CNBC and The Weather Channel".) The NBC Agency was the inspiration for the NBCUniversal Marketing Council, which Miller helped create. The Council comprises the leaders of marketing throughout NBC, and is responsible for "all cross-company promotion".

NBC Agency's non-traditional approach to promoting the network was the cover story of the March 2005 CMO Magazine entitled "Dream Team: How NBC, Scholastic and Campbell Soup put a noble twist on product placement". To promote an essay writing contest among high school students, Scholastic created and distributed curriculum material to high schools; Campbell's funded media advertising, related promotional material on soup cans, and an award to the essay winner; and NBC worked the essay contest in to the story line through seven episodes of Heroes. Miller was "pleased with the effort" but acknowledged it did not increase ratings or viewership for Heroes, and said that interweaving products in to storylines had to be done in a way that "feels natural to the show".

Miller and Manze were recognized again in 2007 as Entertainment Marketers of the Year by Ad Age for their efforts in what Claire Atkinson called the "breakout freshman show of the year", Heroes. Atkinson says the team worked before the show premiered to "sow the seeds" by developing a "four-way partnership" with NBC in which iTunes provided free access to the show to viewers who exchanged cards given them at Regal Cinemas by Nissan USA. Miller and Manze also helped fansites promote the show, and used a video on YouTube and Break.com that "spread like wildfire", so that before the show debuted, it already had a following.

The first decade of the 21st century saw many rapid changes in media, the merger of NBC and Universal, and a planned NBC acquisition of Comcast meant a lesser role for The Agency and Miller decided it was time again for a change.

=== 2010–2015: NBC Sports Agency and NBC Sports Group ===
In June 2010, anticipating his 60th birthday and stating that network advertising and marketing is "a young man's game" Miller decided "it was time to turn things over to the next generation". Encouraged by his wife Sharon, He relocated to the East Coast and began to discuss changing career direction. He planned to announce his retirement at the annual Promax convention. Jeff Gaspin (who was then chairman of NBCUniversal Television Entertainment) stated that: "When he asked to retire, we immediately began thinking of opportunities ... to keep him on the team." After 25 years described by Andreeva as "one of the longest and most successful careers in entertainment marketing", Miller transitioned to focus on the pending integration of NBCU and Comcast. He retained his position as CMO of NBC Universal Television Group.

After the merger of NBCUniversal and Comcast was completed in early 2011, NBC announced that Miller would end his semi-retirement to set up the NBC Sports Agency—similar to the NBC Agency he had co-founded in 1999. It was to be the "go-to agency for all sports-related advertising" at NBC, according to Ad Week.

At the same time, Miller became CMO of NBC Sports Group (Note: According to NBC and Miller, this group included NBC Sports, NBC Olympics, NBCSN, Golf Channel, the 10 NBC Sports Regional Networks, NBC Sports Radio and NBC Sports Digital.) to "develop cross-channel spots to promote shows and sports across all of NBC Sports' and Comcast's channels". The type of cross-channel promotions Miller would be developing were seen almost immediately after the integration of the two companies, when NBC's coverage of hockey games included promotions for Versus's NHL programs, with similar to occur in golf as NBC and Comcast's Golf Channel would share coverage with a logo "Golf Channel on NBC".

The 2012 Summer Olympics in London saw an explosion in use of technology, mobile devices and social media fueling a diversification in audiences and changing viewer demographics; according to Miller, younger viewers watched most of the 2014 Winter Olympics on a smartphone, while older viewers watched almost all coverage on a television. With more ways to get closer to the audience, Miller said a creative message remained "the magic bullet" and that NBC's campaign emphasized "getting closer to the sports you love". A 2016 article in The Philadelphia Inquirer said that fans had long complained about NBC Olympic broadcasts that did not air the Olympics opening ceremony live, and that "the growth of social media has made recent years' complaints even louder".

=== 2015–2022: NBC Olympics and Symphony ===
On his 65th birthday in 2015, Miller was named the CMO for NBC Olympics in charge of marketing for the 2016 Rio Summer Olympics and, along with Jenny Storms, the 2018 Korean Winter Olympics. He developed an eight-tier campaign for the Rio Olympics that accounted for changes in viewer demographics fueled by social media and internet accessibility on multiple devices.

Miller was criticized for remarks he made during a press conference about NBC's plans for primetime coverage of the Rio Summer Olympics. He stated that: "The people who watch the Olympics are not particularly sports fans. More women watch the Games than men, and for the women, they're less interested in the result and more interested in the journey." Linda Stasi of the New York Daily News called his statement "pandering, condescending" and "sexist nonsense". Sally Jenkins of The Washington Post wrote that it was "not inherently sexist for them to say that women have some different viewing habits and interests than men", but that with alternate live-streaming options available, "NBC is living in the past with its heavy packaging and commercial interruptions."

Miller maintained his role as Chair of the NBCUniversal Marketing Council and oversaw the joint marketing collaborative process known as Symphony. Ad Age described Symphony as "the network's ad tool that promotes single shows or brands across its portfolio, from TV to film to theme parks to technology"; Miller says it created in NBCUniversal a "culture of collaboration". Symphony became the subject of a Harvard Business School study and was described by a dean at the Yale School of Management as "the rare successful model of cross-promotional cooperation".

After 43 years with NBC, Miller retired in June 2022.

=== Carnegie Mellon Heinz College ===
Miller became a faculty lecturer in the Master of Entertainment Industry Management program of the Heinz College at Carnegie Mellon University, where he was previously an adjunct professor.

== Legacy ==
Variety magazine described Miller in 2016 as "one of the most respected marketers in the TV biz and a much admired figure at NBCUniversal". Steve Kazanjian, the president and CEO of Promax, called Miller's work at NBC "groundbreaking", adding that for decades it "defined best practices for entertainment marketing". Writing for Promax in 2016, Paige Albiniak stated that the NBC Agency "changed television promotion and marketing as it was then known". Madkour wrote in 2014: "With the short shelf life of brand CMOs, Miller has shown remarkable longevity as a network marketer." He was involved in many NBC promotional campaigns—including 'Come Home to NBC', 'Just Watch Us Now', 'Let's all Be There', and 'More Colorful' along with 'Must See TV'—that led to what Schneider called "dramatic changes" in network marketing; Schneider stated that "Miller and his team" had "instigated much of that change".

One campaign slogan that the Miller/Manze team are known for that did not work was 'If You Haven't Seen It, It's New to You', which aired in 1998. Miller acknowledged that most viewers said there was a reason they didn't watch a show the first time. In a 2010 interview with Josef Adalian for Vulture magazine, Miller conceded other less-successful promotions. 'Standing up for Jay' for the '1990s The Tonight Show with Jay Leno came across "like a hokey political campaign ad" according to Miller. He said that Friday Night Lights was his "most frustrating show" because it was so hard to sell. In 1987, Miller singled out two earlier campaigns he worked on that "came back to haunt" him: Manimal and The Rousters.

Upon Miller's retirement in 2022, Parker Herren described him in Ad Age as "the legendary marketer" of "iconic" and "renowned NBC series" including Friends, Seinfeld, Miami Vice, The Golden Girls, The West Wing, The Office, 30 Rock, and Heroes. According to Schneider, Miller and Manze "helped stoke [the] flames [of] success of shows" with the 'Must See TV' and 'NBC 2000' campaigns. Other shows that Miller was involved in branding and promoting include The Cosby Show, Knight Rider and The A-Team.

Miller was "the driving force behind ... the two most-watched programs in U.S. television for 2012"—the February 5 Super Bowl and the 2012 Summer Olympics—according to a 2012 Golf Channel article. During his career, he marketed 12 Olympics, as well as Sunday Night Football and events for other sports such as golf and hockey. His Olympic and football campaigns set viewership records.

Robert Rimes described Miller in a BPME publication as organized, intelligent and dedicated, with a "calm exterior and methodical management style" and "an uncanny ability to ... move on to new challenges when he has mastered the ones he is currently responsible for implementing".

In an Op-Ed published in the October 16, 2024 issue of U.S. News and World Report, Miller, referring to former president Donald Trump, wrote, "I want to apologize to America. I helped create a monster." He went on to say, "I led the team that marketed "The Apprentice," the reality show that made Donald Trump a household name...[w]hile we were successful in marketing "The Apprentice," we also did irreparable harm by creating the false image of Trump as a successful leader. I deeply regret that. And I regret that it has taken me so long to go public." Miller ended the Op-Ed by writing, "I spent 50 years successfully promoting television magic, making mountains out of molehills every day. But I say now to my fellow Americans, without any promotional exaggeration: If you believe that Trump will be better for you or better for the country, that is an illusion, much like "The Apprentice" was. Even if you are a born-and-bred Republican, as I was, I strongly urge you to vote for Kamala Harris. The country will be better off and so will you."

== Awards and recognition ==
Among Miller's multiple awards with NBC were nine Emmys. An advertising spot for Snap.com received an Outstanding Commercial Primetime Emmy for Miller, Manze and NBC in 1999, and was recognized as the World's Best Commercial by the IBA. (Note: Sources are unclear: IBA may refer to the International Broadcast Awards.)

In 1991, Miller was inducted in to the Promax/BPME Hall of Fame in recognition of "innovations and contributions to the electronic media". Promax recognized his work on other occasions: in 1995, Miller and Manze were named the Marketing Team of the Year; in 1996, Miller was named the Promotion Executive of the Year; and in 2006 and 2007 he received the Campaigns of Distinction Award. Promax honored him with a Lifetime Achievement Award in 2016.

In sports, from the Clio Awards, Miller received the Stuart Scott Lifetime Achievement Award in 2016 from Jon Miller, the president of programming of NBC Sports, who called his colleague "a living example of a great brand himself ... the epitome of what a leader should be". Cynopsis honored him as the Sports Marketer of the Year three times: in 2012, 2013, and 2016.

Miller was recognized as the Entertainment Marketer of the Year four times. The first was shared with Manze in 1995, with more than 50 others vying for the award; Jim Chabin (then the president and CEO of Promax) stated: "I was astonished how many people from other networks voted for John and Vince" in an "across-the-board kind of vote of confidence and respect" from the 1,880-member organization. In 2007, Miller and Manze were named again by Ad Age for their efforts in the TV show Heroes; Atkinson wrote that they selected the best promotional phrase of the season "that became part of the U.S. vernacular"—"Save the cheerleader, save the world".

== Family and personal life ==
Miller and Sharon Worsham were married in July 1981. They have four sons, and have turned John's musical interests into a family activity.

=== Barbershop singing ===
From an early age, Miller was involved in barbershop harmony quartets; as a bass singer with the group Grandma's Boys, he won the Illinois district championship in 1968 when he was 17. He has won twice an international barbershop quartet championship: in 1979, with Grandma's Boys and in 1985 with The New Tradition. He has been named a "Barbershop Hero" in the Hall of Fame of the Barbershop Harmony Society (BHS) and has served on its board. Miller and his wife Sharon have assisted BHS with fundraising, sponsorships, and leadership.

=== Community service and affiliations ===
Miller serves on Syracuse University's Newhouse School of Public Communications Advisory Board as of 2022.

In 2021, Miller chaired the Clio Sports Awards and he served as a juror in 2020. He has served on the BPME (now Promax) board, and chaired and produced award competitions for the organization.
