= Forefront (quartet) =

Barbershop quartet

- Origin: Louisville, Kentucky; Columbus, Ohio; Champaign, Illinois; Terre Haute, Indiana
- Genre: Barbershop
- Members: Drew Wheaton – tenor Kevin Hughes – lead Aaron Hughes – baritone Brian O'Dell – bass
- Past members: Garry Texeira – tenor
- Website: forefrontquartet.com

Forefront is the barbershop quartet that won the International Quartet Championship for 2016 at the Barbershop Harmony Society's annual international convention, in Nashville, Tennessee. The quartet had placed second in the 2014 and 2015 international contests, after competing at the international level annually since 2010. Forefront formed in August 2009.

== Discography ==
- Forefront (CD; June 2013)
- The Loveliest Thing (CD; June 2016)

Preceded by Instant Classic	SPEBSQSA International Quartet Champions; 2016	Succeeded by Main Street
