= The Rapscallions =

American barbershop quartet, 1980–1986

- Years active: 1980–86
- Members: Dave Smotzer – tenor David Wallace – lead Tim Frye – baritone Jeff Oxley – bass

The Rapscallions, formed in 1980 by four Bowling Green State University (Ohio) students, won the 1984 international quartet championship in St. Louis, Missouri.

The quartet placed in the top ten internationally each of the three years they competed: ninth place in 1982, sixth in 1983, and first in 1984.

Tenor Dave Smotzer, lead David Wallace, baritone Tim Frye, and bass Jeff Oxley formed the quartet in 1980 while working summer jobs in Cedar Point, Ohio, to earn money to return to the university.

All were members of the A Cappella Choir and the Men's Chorus at the school and had other musical training. Oxley had sung lead roles in campus productions of Man of La Mancha and The Marriage of Figaro and was studying for an operatic career. Frye was a music education major, and Smotzer was a music theatre major. David Wallace was a composition major and the first undergraduate director of an accredited university ensemble, "The Collegiates".

Leaving school in 1982, most of the foursome had moved on to their careers by the time they won the gold. Both Smotzer and Wallace were in business. Smotzer was directing Cincinnati's Southern Gateway Chorus, and Wallace was directing Sweet Adelines International's City of Flags Chorus in Canton, Ohio. Frye was a school teacher and a music director in Wayne County, Ohio, while Oxley was continuing his musical training. He would go on to become an accomplished music director of the Masters of Harmony from 1998-1999 and winning a chorus gold, winning two more quartet gold medals with Acoustix in 1990 and with Max Q in 2007.

== Discography ==
- Premiere LP, cassette

Preceded by Side Street Ramblers	Barbershop Harmony Society International Quartet Champions; 1984	Succeeded by The New Tradition
