= Association of Far Western District Champions =

Organization of barbershop gold medalists

The Association of Far Western District Champions (AFWDC), is an affiliate organization of the Far Western District association of chapters of the Barbershop Harmony Society (Society for the Preservation and Encouragement of Barber Shop Quartet Singing in America, Inc. (SPEBSQSA)). Founded in 1980–81, its members are the champions of the district's annual quartet contests, from 1947 to present. AFWDC's primary purpose is to raise funds to subsidize the travel expenses of Far Western District quartets who qualify to compete at the Barbershop Harmony Society's international quartet contest. Main sources of fundraising are the proceeds of two shows produced annually: the Past Champs Show, held the Friday evening of the district's annual convention; and the Go For The Gold Show, held each June.

The organization was conceived by Nick Papageorge, lead singer of The Occidentals, 1977 FWD Quartet Champions. The AFWDC was named by Dan Jordan, who officially founded the association in 1980 with Nick Papageorge. The first meeting took place in 1979 in Bakersfield. The first AFWDC "Late Show" was held in 1980 in Phoenix, Arizona. The first Go For The Gold Show was held in 1982 in Los Angeles. The first Scorpionaires chorus performance took place in 1983 in Pasadena; this chorus was named by Lloyd Steinkamp and the Blythe, California, chapter it represents was named by Dan Jordan. The bylaws were drafted by Sam Aramian and Dan Jordan in 1979. The black membership badges were created by Dan Jordan and developed by the then society jeweler in 1979. The first and third president of the AFWDC was Dan Jordan (1979–1984 and 1986–1988) the second president was Don Gubbins (1984–1986). Nick Papageorge became the president in 1988 by vote in absentia due to the death of Dan Jordan's father-in-law. No past champs breakfast was held, and a majority in attendance took a vote.

A complete photographic (private) collection was developed by Dan Jordan.

Jordan, with help by Jack Hines, presented a proposal to the FWD board for a $1.00-per-district-member fund for international-bound competing quartets. The fund began in 1983 and augments the Go For The Gold Show proceeds to help with quartet expenses.

== Sources ==
- Personal files and papers from Dan Jordan. President from 1979–1984 and 1986–1988.
- Live recording from "The Occidentals" announcement of the creation of the Association of Far Western District Champions at the FWD Convention, 1978
