= The New Tradition =

American barbershop quartet from California

- Years active: 1984–89
- Members: John Sherburn – tenor Dan Jordan – lead Bob Gray Jr. – baritone John Miller – bass

The New Tradition is the California Barbershop quartet that won the 1985 SPEBSQSA international competition. The name refers to an earlier quartet, the Grand Tradition, with the same lead and baritone. It is not to be confused with the New Tradition Chorus from Northbrook, Illinois.

== Discography ==
- Clowning Around LP, cassette, re-release CD
- TNT Dynamite LP, cassette, re-release CD
- Magical History Tour (Sgt. Pepler's Homely Tarts Pub Band), double CD
- The New Tradition - AIC Masterworks CD (CD; 2008)

Preceded by The Rapscallions	Barbershop Harmony Society International Quartet Champions; 1985	Succeeded by Rural Route 4
