= Oriole Four =

Barbershop quartet

- Genres: Barbershop
- Members: Bob Welzenbach – tenor Jim Grant – lead Fred King – baritone Don Stratton – bass

Oriole Four is a barbershop quartet that won the 1970 SPEBSQSA international competition.

The quartet began in 1958 and became sufficiently well known to garner a guest appearance on television's nationally syndicated The Mike Douglas Show in November 1968. After first qualifying for international competition in 1959, it was in Atlantic City in 1970 that the Oriole Four finally won SPEBSQSA's gold medal. The following year, baritone Fred King directed the Chorus of the Chesapeake to its second international championship, held in New Orleans.

Preceded by Mark IV	SPEBSQSA International Quartet Champions; 1970	Succeeded by Gentlemen's Agreement
