= Far Western District =

Geographical region

The Far Western District is a geographical district of the Barbershop Harmony Society (BHS).

First organized in 1946, the district encompasses the four far-western US states of California, Nevada, Arizona, and Hawaii, plus St. George, Utah.

The BHS District Map. The Dixie District has since renamed to Southeastern Harmony and the Carolinas separated to their own district.

== Chapters ==
FWD is home to the four-time BHS Championship Gold medalist Westminster Chorus, who won in 2007, 2010, 2015, 2019 and 2024, and the nine-time Gold winner Masters of Harmony Chorus, who won the BHS international competitions in 1990, 1993, 1996, 1999, 2002, 2005, 2008, 2011 and 2017.

The 2002 district champions Garden City Chorus competed 54 years before winning a shot at international-level competition.

The Phoenix Saguaro chapter was founded in 1943. Now called the Greater Phoenix Chapter, its Spirit of Phoenix Chorus became the international gold medalists three times (in 1972, 1976, and 1983) competing as the 'Phabulous' Phoenicians Chorus, and earned other medals eleven times.

== Champion quartets ==
Past district champion quartets become members of the Association of Far Western District Champions. Several have gone on to medal or win at BHS international conventions, notably the 2008 international champions OC Times, 2004 international champions Gotcha! and 1996's Nightlife.
