= Acoustix =

Barbershop quartet

- Origin: Dallas, Texas, U.S.
- Years active: 1990–present
- Members: Todd Wilson – tenor Rick Middaugh – lead Jason January – baritone Joel T. Rutherford – bass
- Past members: Jeff Oxley – bass
- Website: Official site

Acoustix is a Dallas, Texas-based quartet that won the 1990 International Quartet Championship of SPEBSQSA (now Barbershop Harmony Society, or BHS). They have all, at different times, been members of the Dallas-based Vocal Majority chorus.

Acoustix shot to fame in 1990 at their first SPEBSQSA International Contest appearance in San Francisco, just six months after the quartet formed. They stormed to victory in the third round, overcoming 139th Street Quartet and The Naturals to take the gold medal home.

The original bass in the quartet during their championship was Jeff Oxley, who went on to direct the Masters of Harmony chorus from California to their fourth International Championship win in 1999. He also sang bass with the 1984 International Champion quartet The Rapscallions and Max Q, the 2007 International Champion quartet.

== Discography ==
Acoustix have recorded several CDs in various genres.

- The New Science of Sound (CD; 1991)
- Stars & Stripes (Acoustix Productions; CD; 1993), (Intersound Records; CD; 1995)
- Jazz, Jazz, Jazz (Acoustix Productions; CD; 1998)
- Cool Yule (Acoustix Productions; CD; 1999)
- O Worship the King (Acoustix Productions; CD; 2002)
- All the Best (Acoustix Productions; CD; 2015)

Also appear on:

- Bolton Landing "LIVE" 1998, double cassette, double CD

Preceded by Second Edition	Barbershop Harmony Society International Quartet Champions; 1990	Succeeded by The Ritz
