= Boston Common (quartet) =

Barbershop quartet

The Boston Common
- Genres: Barbershop
- Years active: 1971 – c. 1995
- Members: Kent Martin – tenor Rich Knapp – lead Larry Tully – baritone Terry Clarke – bass

The Boston Common is the barbershop quartet that won the 1980 SPEBSQSA international competition at Salt Lake City, Utah.

Formed in 1971, they took their name from Boston Common, a well known park. Competing throughout the seventies, they were more popular with audiences than with judges. After they won silver in 1979, they agreed to compete one last time, and took the gold in 1980 with their set of Lou Perry's arrangements of "Who Told You" and "That Old Quartet of Mine". A traffic accident in 1982 left lead Rich Knapp unable to continue singing, but the quartet enlisted Tom Spirito of the Four Rascals to substitute.

== Discography ==
- The Boston Common (LP)
- In The Heart of the City (LP)
- Many Happy Returns (LP)
- Smilin' Through (LP)
- Collective Works (double CD) encompassing the above LPs

Preceded by Grandma's Boys	Barbershop Harmony Society International Quartet Champions; 1980	Succeeded by Chicago News
