= List of Barbershop Harmony Society quartet champions =

This article lists the Barbershop Harmony Society's international quartet champions by the year in which they won. Quartets can win only once, though up to two members may appear together in another quartet and compete again. In this manner individual singers may win multiple gold medals. Twenty men have won two or more gold medals, of whom five have won three or more. One man, Tony DeRosa, has won five, while another, Joe Connelly, has won four.

Only four women have ever won the championship: the four members of GQ (Girls Quartet), who won in 2026.

Though the competition is international, only three quartets from outside North America have so far won the gold medal: Ringmasters from Sweden in 2012, Musical Island Boys from New Zealand in 2014 and Lemon Squeezy from Sweden in 2025. The Town and Country Four were the first quartet to win internationally as the contest was held in Canada for the first time in 1963. Disruption caused by the COVID-19 pandemic resulted in cancellation of the 2020 and 2021 international contests, the only years in the society's 88-year history without one.

- 2026 – GQ
- 2025 – Lemon Squeezy
- 2024 – Three and a Half Men
- 2023 – Midtown
- 2022 – Quorum
- 2021 – No champion due to the COVID-19 pandemic
- 2020 – No champion due to the COVID-19 pandemic
- 2019 – Signature
- 2018 – After Hours
- 2017 – Main Street
- 2016 – Forefront
- 2015 – Instant Classic
- 2014 – Musical Island Boys
- 2013 – Masterpiece
- 2012 – Ringmasters
- 2011 – Old School
- 2010 – Storm Front
- 2009 – Crossroads
- 2008 – OC Times
- 2007 – Max Q
- 2006 – Vocal Spectrum
- 2005 – Realtime
- 2004 – Gotcha!
- 2003 – Power Play
- 2002 – Four Voices
- 2001 – Michigan Jake
- 2000 – PLATINUM
- 1999 – FRED
- 1998 – Revival
- 1997 – Yesteryear
- 1996 – Nightlife
- 1995 – Marquis
- 1994 – Joker's Wild
- 1993 – Gas House Gang
- 1992 – Keepsake
- 1991 – The Ritz
- 1990 – Acoustix
- 1989 – Second Edition
- 1988 – Chiefs of Staff
- 1987 – Interstate Rivals
- 1986 – Rural Route 4
- 1985 – The New Tradition
- 1984 – The Rapscallions
- 1983 – Side Street Ramblers
- 1982 – Classic Collection
- 1981 – Chicago News
- 1980 – Boston Common
- 1979 – Grandma's Boys
- 1978 – Bluegrass Student Union
- 1977 – Most Happy Fellows
- 1976 – Innsiders
- 1975 – Happiness Emporium
- 1974 – Regents
- 1973 – Dealer's Choice
- 1972 – Golden Staters
- 1971 – Gentlemen's Agreement
- 1970 – Oriole Four
- 1969 – Mark IV
- 1968 – Western Continentals
- 1967 – Four Statesmen
- 1966 – Auto Towners
- 1965 – Four Renegades
- 1964 – Sidewinders
- 1963 – Town and Country Four
- 1962 – Gala Lads
- 1961 – The Suntones
- 1960 – Evans Quartet
- 1959 – Four Pitchikers
- 1958 – Gay Notes
- 1957 – Lads of Enchantment
- 1956 – Confederates
- 1955 – Four Hearsemen
- 1954 – Orphans
- 1953 – The Vikings
- 1952 – Four Teens
- 1951 – Schmitt Brothers
- 1950 – Buffalo Bills
- 1949 – Mid States Four
- 1948 – Pittsburghers
- 1947 – Doctors of Harmony
- 1946 – Garden State Quartet
- 1945 – Misfits
- 1944 – Harmony Halls
- 1943 – Four Harmonizers
- 1942 – Elastic Four
- 1941 – Chord Busters
- 1940 – Flat Foot Four
- 1939 – Bartlesville Barflies

== See also ==
- List of Barbershop Harmony Society chorus champions
- Sweet Adelines International competition
