= Barbershop quartet =

Close harmony a cappella singing group

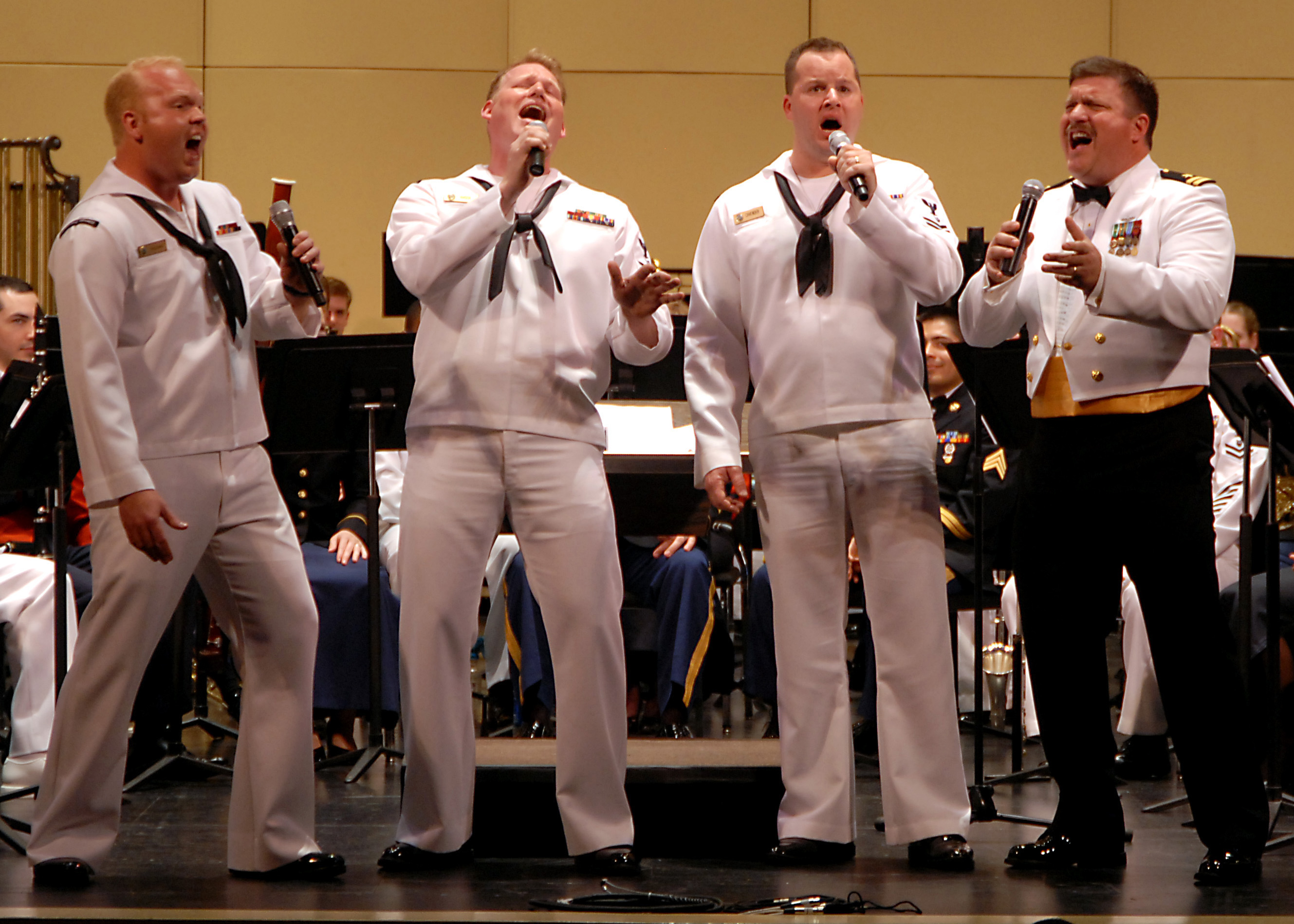
Navy Band Northwest's barbershop quartet in 2008

A barbershop quartet is a group of four singers who sing music in the barbershop style, characterized by four-part harmony without instrumental accompaniment (a cappella). The four voices that make up a quartet are the lead, the bass, the tenor, and the baritone. Barbershop music is typified by close harmony—the upper three voices generally remain within one octave of each other.

Historically, barbershop quartets were mainly sung by male singers; contemporary quartets can include any gender combination. All-female barbershop quartets were often called beauty shop quartets, a term that has fallen out of favor.

While the regional origins of barbershop quartet singing are not wholly agreed upon, current organizations that promote the style typify it as an "old American institution." Though the style is most popular in the United States, barbershop organizations exist in the United Kingdom, the Netherlands, Germany, France, Spain, Italy, Ireland, South Africa, Finland, Sweden, Denmark, New Zealand, Australia, and Canada.

Barbershop quartets have been featured in popular culture in musical theater productions such as The Music Man and lampooned in television series such as The Simpsons and Family Guy.

== History ==
While many sources claim that barbershop singing originated in the late 19th and early 20th centuries in the United States of America, some maintain that the origins of barbershop singing are "obscure". The style is considered a blend of White and African-American musical styles. Although the African-American influence is sometimes overlooked, these quartets had a formative role in the development of the style.

By the 1920s, the popularity of the style had begun to fade. It was revived in the late 1930s along with the founding of the Society for the Preservation and Encouragement of Barber Shop Quartet Singing in America (SPEBSQSA), now known as Barbershop Harmony Society, abbreviated as BHS. The society's first meeting was held at the Tulsa Club in Tulsa, Oklahoma, on April 11, 1938, and it was open only to male singers. In 1945, a parallel organization for women was also founded in Tulsa, called Sweet Adelines International (SAI). Harmony, Incorporated (HI), also serving women, was established in Rhode Island in 1959. After BHS fully welcomed women in 2018, The Society for the Preservation and Propagation of Barbershop Quartet Singing in the United States (SPPBSQSUS) formed with a focus on all-male barbershop quartet singing; since 2024, it operates as the Worldwide Barbershop Quartet Association (WBQA).

In 1971, BHS president Ralph Ribble launched a successful "Barberpole Cat Program" to encourage barbershop singing as widely as possible. Barbershop songs were published and promoted to provide a core set of pieces for barbershop quartets. The current 12 songs and the tag end of two others were selected in 1987.

== Style of dress ==
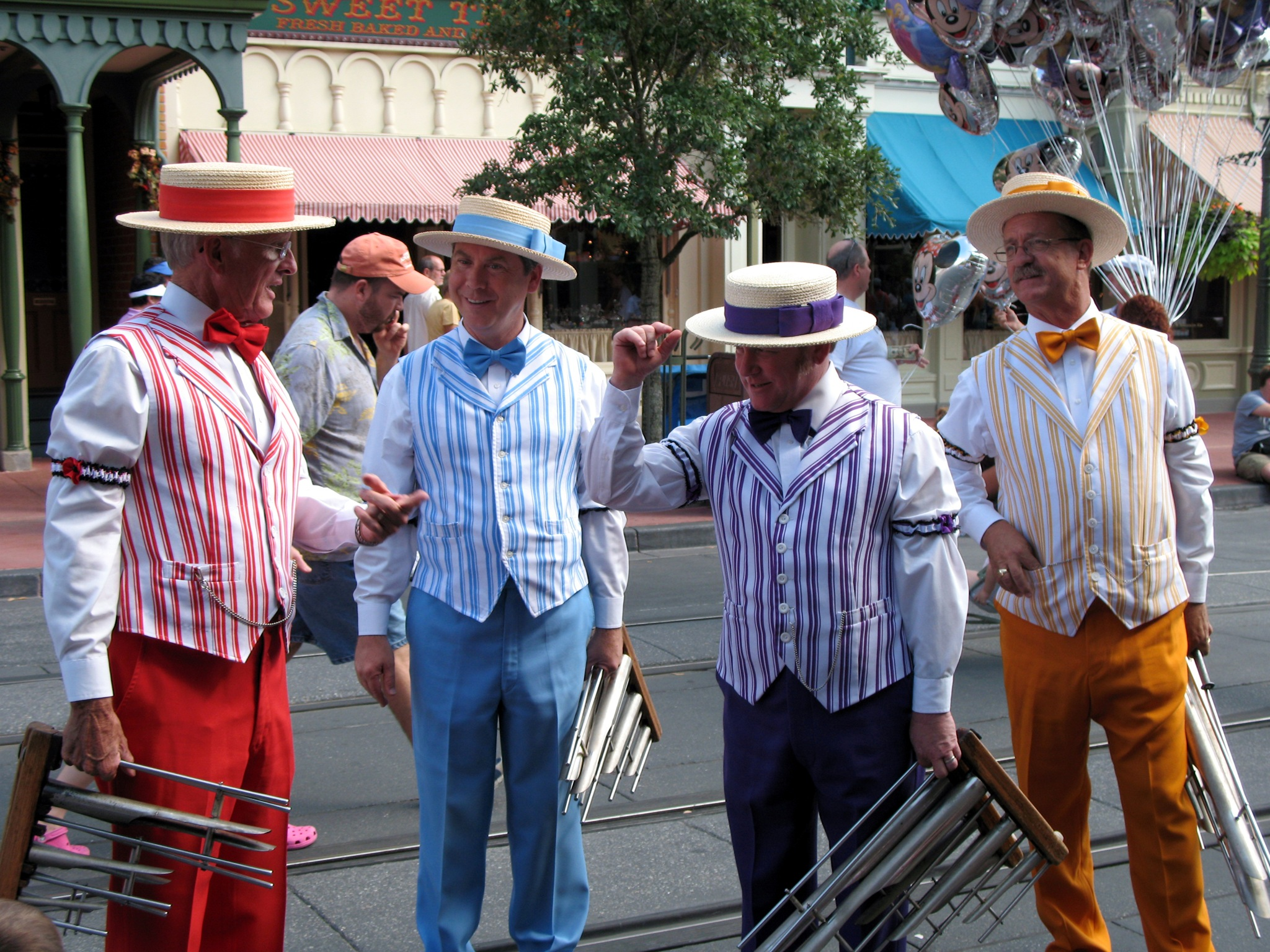
The Dapper Dans at Disney World dressed in the traditional barbershop quartet style in 2006.

In competition, barbershop quartets generally wear coordinated outfits to mark them as members of the same group. The Society Contest and Judging Committee of the Barbershop Harmony Society notes in their rule book that aesthetics are important to competitive success: "The judge responds to both the vocal and visual aspects of the performance, but the judge principally evaluates the interaction of those aspects as they work together to create the image of the song."

Traditionally, barbershop quartet attire consisted of a vest, straw hat, and spats, often with bow ties and sleeve garters; this is known as the Gay Nineties style. In popular culture, this style exemplifies the stereotypical barbershop quartet. Several Walt Disney theme parks feature a dedicated barbershop quartet called The Dapper Dans, whose outfits vary depending on location but do feature vests and straw hats.

== Roles of vocal parts ==
Male barbershop quartets use TTBB (tenor—tenor—baritone—bass) arrangements, with the second tenor singing the lead. Since the 1940s, barbershop singers have tuned their seventh chords with just intonation to maximize the overtones, yielding a distinctive "ringing" sound.

Max Q, championship winners of the Barbershop Harmony Society's international barbershop convention in 2007. From left to right: Greg Clancy (tenor), Tony De Rosa (lead), Jeff Oxley (bass), and Gary Lewis (baritone)

Female barbershop quartets use SSAA (Soprano—Soprano—Alto—Alto) arrangements, while applying the same range names as a TTBB arrangement. Mixed barbershop quartets use SATB (Soprano—Alto—Tenor—Bass) arrangements.

Tenor: The tenor generally harmonizes above the lead, making the part the highest in the quartet. So as not to overpower the lead singer, who carries the tune, the part is often sung in falsetto, which is of a softer quality than singing in the modal register, though some quartets do make use of tenors with a softer full-voice quality. Notable examples of barbershop quartets which made use of the full-voiced tenor include The Buffalo Bills, Boston Common and Vocal Spectrum.

The range of a tenor in barbershop music does not necessarily closely correspond to that of a tenor's range in Classical repertoire, often being more in the range of the classical countertenor range.

Lead: The lead, often a lower or second tenor, usually sings the main melody.

Baritone: The baritone often completes the chord with a medium voice, usually slightly below the lead, but sometimes above it. While the baritone's part by itself does not sound as "melodious" as the other three, the baritone plays a fundamental role in the quartet in filling in the missing notes and giving each chord a fuller sound.

Bass: The bass always sings and harmonizes the lowest notes, often setting the root of the chord for root position chords, or singing the lowest note of the chord for inverted chords.

== In popular culture ==
- The TV sitcom I Love Lucy used the cast in a barbershop quartet in the 1952 episode, "Lucy's Show-Biz Swan Song"; some of the same footage was used for a flashback in their 1956 Christmas show.
- The Buffalo Bills barbershop quartet (Barbershop Harmony Society International Quartet Champions of 1950), who starred in the 1957 Meredith Willson Broadway musical The Music Man, were also cast in the 1962 film adaptation starring Robert Preston and Shirley Jones.
- In the 1969 novel "Slaughterhouse-Five", Kurt Vonnegut uses a barbershop quartet as a symbol to link between Billy's worlds.
- Barbershop music is featured extensively in the 1975 post-apocalyptic film A Boy and His Dog.
- Cheers features a barbershop quartet in the season 4 episode "Dark Imaginings" (1986), and in the season 8 episode "The Stork Brings a Crane" (1989).
- The Forever Plaid musical (1989) tells the story of Frankie (lead/second tenor), Jinx (tenor), Sparky (baritone), and Smudge (bass), a barbershop quartet that gets the chance to come back to life after dying in a bus crash.
- Sesame Street has included barbershop quartets of humans and of Muppets who imitate the genre with the songs "When You Cooperate", "Long Time No See", "Small B", "Same Different Barbershop Quartet", and "Counting Floors", among others.

=== 1990s ===
- A 1993 episode of The Simpsons, "Homer's Barbershop Quartet", parodies the journey of The Beatles as though they are each members of a barbershop quartet named "The Be Sharps". The episode stars The Dapper Dans, a Disneyland quartet.
- In the 1997 Friends episode titled "The One with All the Jealousy", Ross Geller hires a barbershop quartet and sends it to Rachel's office to sing her a love song.
- Frasier features a barbershop quartet in the episode, "Frasier's Curse" (1998).
- In the 1999 Family Guy episode titled "Brian: Portrait of a Dog", Brian Griffin does an impression of a barbershop quartet.
- In nearly every episode of Nick Jr. Channel's television program Blue's Clues (1996–2006), a barbershop quartet harmonizes the word "Mailtime", after which the show host sings the mail time song as the mail arrives at their house.

=== 2000s ===
- Episodes of Family Guy in 2005 and 2006 used songs by a barbershop quartet to inform a hospital patient he has AIDS, and to describe a vasectomy.
- Episodes of Jack's Big Music Show frequently feature the "Schwartzman Quartet" of four puppet brothers; in the season 2 episode "Jack's Super Swell Sing-Along" (2007), they sing about being a barbershop quartet.
- Psych's fourth season's seventh episode, "High Top Fade-Out" (2009), prominently features the murder of a member of Gus's college barbershop quartet. Originally called "Blackapella", the quartet is renamed "Quarterblack" once Shawn (a white man) joins.
- The Internet webcomic Homestuck (2009–2016) features a barbershop cover of the Eddie Morton song, "I'm a Member of the Midnight Crew". The cover was sung by a fan of the series and was put into the comic on the page, "DD: Ascend more casually."

=== 2010s ===
- The 2010 video game, Toy Story 3, includes a Pict-O-Matic cutscene wherein, if the player dresses four citizens in a barber outfit, it triggers another cutscene in which they become a barbershop quartet.
- Several animated shorts of the webcomic Cyanide and Happiness include a barbershop quartet. In "Barbershop Quartet Hits on Girl From Taxi" (2010), quartet members and the driver lean outside a slow-moving taxi and flirt with a girl by harmonizing, until the taxi crashes into a tree.
- In the 2011 Victorious episode titled "Beggin' on Your Knees", a group of four boys is seen pleading in a barbershop quartet style for their music teacher to allow them to sing as a quartet for a musical performance.
- The Ben Show (2013) has a recurring sketch in which a barbershop quartet sings the titles of porn videos.
- The 2013 video game BioShock Infinite (set in 1912) includes a barbershop quartet anachronistically singing a rendition of The Beach Boys' 1966 song "God Only Knows".
- The 2017 video game Cuphead, known for its 1930s cartoon style, contains two songs sung by barbershop quartet 'Shoptimus Prime: "Don't Deal with the Devil" and "A Quick Break".
- In a 2019 GEICO television commercial, a barbershop quartet sings while playing a four-on-four basketball game. The quartet in the ad is #TheAccidentals.

== See also ==
- Barbershop Chorus
- Gospel quartet
- List of Barbershop Harmony Society quartet champions
- Sweet Adelines International competition
