= List of alumni of collegiate a cappella groups =

The following is a list of notable alumni of collegiate a cappella singing groups.

Alumni sorted alphabetically by last name
Name	Institution	Group	Citation
Chris Ayer	Stanford University	Stanford Mendicants	
Paris Barclay	Harvard University	Krokodiloes	
Sara Bareilles	UCLA	Awaken A Cappella	
Gavin Becker	Vanderbilt University	The Melodores	
Kevin Bleyer	Stanford University	Stanford Fleet Street Singers	
Alex Brightman	New York University	N'Harmonics	
James Bundy	Harvard University	Krokodiloes	
Prescott Bush	Yale University	Whiffenpoofs	
Jonathan Coulton	Yale University	Whiffenpoofs	
Anoop Desai	University of North Carolina at Chapel Hill	Clef Hangers	
Brandon Victor Dixon	Columbia University	High Bias	
George Fan	University of California, Berkeley	DeCadence A Cappella	
Sameer Gadhia	Stanford University	Stanford Talisman	
Peter Gallagher	Tufts University	Beelzebubs	
Adam Gardner	Tufts University	Beelzebubs	
Art Garfunkel	Columbia University	Kingsmen	
Jordan Gelber	Stanford University	Stanford Mendicants	
Juliette Goglia	University of Southern California	SoCal VoCals	
Ross Golan	University of Southern California	SoCal VoCals	
Lauren Graham	Barnard College	Metrotones	
Davis Guggenheim	Brown University	Brown Derbies	
Fred Gwynne	Harvard University	Krokodiloes	
Brett Haber	Dartmouth College	Dodecaphonics	
Ed Helms	Oberlin College	Obertones	
Scott Hoying	University of Southern California	SoCal VoCals	
Kelley Jakle	University of Southern California	SoCal VoCals	
Rashida Jones	Harvard University	Opportunes	
Mindy Kaling	Dartmouth College	Rockapellas	
Adam Kantor	Northwestern University	THUNK a cappella	
Siddhartha Khosla	University of Pennsylvania	Off the Beat	
Michael K. Lee	Stanford University	Stanford Fleet Street Singers	
John Legend	University of Pennsylvania	Counterparts	
Ryan Leslie	Harvard University	Krokodiloes	
George C. Lodge	Harvard University	Krokodiloes	
Tom Lowe	Harvard University	The Harvard-Radcliffe Veritones	
Rick McFarland	Brigham Young University	Vocal Point	
Ingrid Michaelson	Binghamton University	The Binghamtonics	
Wentworth Miller	Princeton University	Princeton Tigertones	
Masi Oka	Brown University	The Bear Necessities	
Laurence O'Keefe	Harvard University	Krokodiloes	
Joe Pera	Ithaca College	Ithacapella	
Cole Porter	Yale University	Whiffenpoofs	
Catherine Ricafort	University of Southern California	SoCal VoCals	
Nicolette Robinson	UCLA	Awaken A Cappella	
Diane Sawyer	Wellesley College	Blue Notes	
Deke Sharon	Tufts University	Beelzebubs	
Joseph Siravo	Stanford University	Stanford Mendicants	
James Snyder	University of Southern California	SoCal VoCals	
Mira Sorvino	Harvard University	The Harvard-Radcliffe Veritones	
Antwaun Stanley	University of Michigan	Dicks and Janes	
Meryl Streep	Vassar College	The Night Owls	
Vienna Teng	Stanford University	Stanford Harmonics	
Shaina Taub	New York University	N'Harmonics	
Christopher Tin	Stanford University	Stanford Talisman	
Aisha Tyler	Dartmouth College	Rockapellas	
James Van Der Beek	Drew University	36 Madison Avenue	

== See also ==
- List of collegiate a cappella groups
- Collegiate a cappella
- A cappella
