= The Hangovers (Cornell University) =

American collegiate a cappella ensemble

- Origin: Cornell University in Ithaca, New York
- Genre: Collegiate a cappella
- Years active: 1968–present
- Website: www.hangovers.com

The Hangovers are a men's collegiate a cappella ensemble based at Cornell University. Founded in 1968, they are the oldest active a cappella group on campus and are the official a cappella subset of the Cornell University Glee Club, itself the oldest student organization of any kind at Cornell University. The Hangovers' repertoire consists mainly of popular songs arranged for the ensemble by its members and alumni, but the group also performs traditional Cornell songs, as well as selections from the Glee Club repertoire on occasion.

The Hangovers have competed in international competitions such as the International Championship of Collegiate A Cappella, advancing to the semifinals in 2001. The Hangovers can be heard on the PBS American Experience documentary "Rescue at Sea." The Hangovers have performed for Helmut Schmidt, the widow of Anwar Sadat, Valéry Giscard d'Estaing, Gerald Ford, Henry Kissinger, Cornell alumna Justice Ruth Bader Ginsburg, Ladysmith Black Mambazo, and other notables.

== History ==
The group's name is taken from the name that was given to fifth-year students in Cornell's five-year architecture and engineering programs of the 1960s. After their fourth (senior) year, students in these programs had to hang over an additional year to complete their degrees. Several of the group's original members were "hangovers" in this sense at the time of the group's formation, hence the name. The double entendre of the more widely accepted meaning of the word is intentional, and is a theme carried on in the titles of the ensemble's concerts and albums.

The Hangovers, at 58 years old, are the oldest active a cappella ensemble at Cornell University. The previous holders of that distinction, the Cayuga's Waiters, split from the Cornell University Glee Club in 1956 and existed as an independent ensemble until their dissolution in 2017.

== Concerts ==
Statue of Ezra Cornell used to publicize for Happy Hour.

The Hangovers have two major on-campus concerts every year, one in the Fall semester and one in late in the Spring semester. The Fall concert is named Fall Tonic, a title resurrected in and used since 1980 in homage to the Sherwoods, who preceded the Hangovers as a Glee Club subset and had an annual autumn concert of the same title. The first guest groups at the 1980 Fall Tonic were Yale's Proof in the Pudding, University of Rochester's Yellowjackets, and Cornell's Nothing But Treble.

The Hangovers' Spring concert, in keeping with their penchant with alcoholic double entendres, is called Happy Hour. The first Happy Hour was held in Barnes Hall in the early spring of 1993. Happy Hour II, and every Happy Hour since, has been held in Sage Chapel (due to its increased seating capacity and it being home to many Cornell University Glee Club events). Happy Hour II was also the first to be held the night before Slope Day (as a "kick-off" event).

== Recordings ==
Throughout the year, the Hangovers perform arch sings in the archways at Balch Hall, Memorial Arch, and Baker Hall.

The Hangovers have released numerous albums over the years, the titles of which are all puns on drinking, or drinking-related themes. As Michael Slon points out in his book Songs From The Hill, one album, Behind Bars, manages to achieve a quadruple-entendre: first, for the normal meaning of the phrase, meaning "incarcerated"; second, the reference to bars as drinking establishments; third, an allusion to bars as a period of music, and finally, as a reference to the striped rugby shirts the Hangovers wear at some performances. In 1980, their original single titled "Facetime" received national recognition and earned mention in Yale's "Guide to Selective Colleges." The song was recently re-recorded on the album "Blackout" with another original song, "River to the Sea".

The Hangovers have released sixteen albums and one EP:

- The Hangovers (1970; re-released in 2001 on CD)
- Slightly Sober (1979)
- Facetime (1981)
- Hangin' Out (1984)
- Cheers (1986)
- Behind Bars (1989)
- On The Rocks (1994)
- Moonshine (1996)
- Spirits (1999)
- Shot In The Dark (2001)
- Vintage (2004)
- Blackout (2005)
- Three Sheets to the Wind (2008)
- Final Draught (2013)
- A Flight (EP) (2015)
- Open 5th (2018)
- Speak Easy (2024)

Three Sheets to the Wind received four award nominations for the 2009 Contemporary A Cappella Recording Awards: Best Male Collegiate Album, Best Humor Song ("You Got a 'C' "), Best Male Collegiate Solo (Evan Graham for "Ignition (Remix)"), and Best Hip-Hop/R&B Song ("Ignition (Remix)"). "Ignition (Remix)" was also featured on the 2009 Best of College A Cappella compilation album.

== Other performances and tours ==
Independently of the Cornell University Glee Club, the Hangovers have performed extensively with other collegiate a cappella groups, primarily in the Eastern United States. The ensemble has gone on numerous domestic and international tours, traveling to Germany with the Glee Club in 1970, and making their first solo tour to Bermuda in 1971.

On a 1995 tour to Japan, the Hangovers received attention by donating half of their tour profits to the Kobe Earthquake Relief Fund; on a subsequent tour to Japan and Korea in the spring of 1998, they performed on Inter-FM, a Western-music radio station, in addition to other performances at such venues as the Tokyo-American Club, the United States naval base in Atsugi, Seoul National University, Ewha University and concluded the tour at the Seoul National Arts Center as a guest group for the Seoul National Orchestra.

The Hangovers have also toured Antigua, Jamaica, Switzerland, Italy, Belgium, Germany, Holland, and France; the 2003 tour through Europe had corporate sponsorship. In March 2004, they were shown performing on the Brazilian national evening news, Jornal Nacional. In January 2006, the Hangovers performed to a sold-out audience at the French embassy in Washington, D.C. The Hangovers toured Spain in Spring 2019, including stops in Madrid and Barcelona. The group's most recent international tour brought them to London and Paris in January 2023.

== Alumni ==
The Hangovers have an active network of alumni, who return to Cornell in large numbers for Fall Tonic and also join the current members to sing at the Treman Concert every year during Cornell's Reunions Weekend. Alumni include such notables as Alan Keyes, Dave Ross and Michael B. Polk. Numerous alumni are also involved in post-collegiate a cappella projects. Notable among these are members of the Tone Rangers, a Washington, D.C.–based a cappella group composed almost entirely of Hangovers and Yale University Whiffenpoofs alumni, and The Breakers, a group of former Hangovers who recently toured Malaysia.

== See also ==
- Cornell University Glee Club
- Cornell University
- Collegiate a cappella
