= The Bear Necessities =

American a cappella group from Brown University

- Also known as: The Bears, TBN
- Origin: Providence, Rhode Island, United States
- Genres: A cappella
- Years active: 1992-present
- Label: A Cappella Records (ACR)

The Bear Necessities is an American TTBB a cappella group from Brown University. Also known as "The Bears", they were established in 1992, making them the youngest of the two TTBB a cappella groups at Brown. The Bears have released 8 albums, and are currently in the process of recording an EP to be released in late 2024. They are best known for wearing suspenders and former member Masi Oka, one of the best known alumni of a college a cappella group and actor in the television series Heroes. The group performs at Brown, across the country and internationally. Their repertoire ranges from R&B to jazz to classic rock to pop to Disney songs. Founded as an alternative a cappella ensemble, the group has a tradition of highly theatrical, interactive performance and is acclaimed for creating a fun, down-to-earth atmosphere in both rehearsal and concert. This is evident in the final track of each of their albums, titled “Bear-a-oke,” a karaoke version of one of the album’s songs designed to invite the listener to sing along. The group’s alumni song is "Streets of Philadelphia" by Bruce Springsteen, arranged by member Andrew Callard in 1995.

== History ==
Founded in 1992, The Bear Necessities were an outgrowth of The High Jinks, another all-male singing group at Brown. In the early 1990s, The High Jinks dissolved and former members came together as The Bear Necessities (The High Jinks were revived in 2009). Some of the final members of The High Jinks, after moving to New York City after graduation, went on to begin Rockapella, a nationally known a cappella band.

== Albums ==
- Suspended Disbelief (2023)
- Visions (2016)
- Eat the Beach (2012) - "We are left with a standout track in Stronger and a totally solid album capable of scratching your all-male itch..." - RARB Review
- Teaches of Peaches (2009) – White Shadows was awarded a track on the 2009 Voices Only compilation album – “This isn't just a product of studio work. These guys can sing.” – RARB Review
- Dry Clean Only (2003) – “This is a well-recorded disc, and the Bear Necessities' ensemble sound is smooth, blendy, and in tune...Crash Into Me sounds like the old-school a cappella I fell in love with back in 2000 or so; a gorgeous, creative chordal intro leads seamlessly into a faithful rendition of Dave Matthews' beautiful ballad.” – RARB Review
- Circus People (1999) – “The Bear Necessities deliver the goods. The arrangement is gripping, the solo is heartfelt, and the production is spotless. In short, it's a damn good treatment of a damn good song...The group as a whole rises to the occasion and turns in a very tight performance” – RARB Review
- TBNJ: The Bear Necessities Jam (1996) – featuring Masi Oka '97 – “Simply a great album overall...the studio recordings have by far the best production and engineering that I have ever heard on a collegiate album.” – RARB Review
- Out of Hibernation (1995) – “This album restores my faith in male collegiate a cappella...What makes this group different is that they have a better attitude. Their collective tongues are planted firmly in their collective cheeks. They are clearly having a fun time performing the material, which has the result that you'll have a fun time listening to it.” – RARB Review

Teaches of Peaches (2009)	Dry Clean Only (2003)	Circus People (1999)

== Awards and recognition ==
- In 2009, The Bear Necessities’ cover of the Disney song I'll Make a Man Out of You was awarded a track on Ripple Effect: Constructive Interference, an a cappella compilation album to raise money for Integrated Community Development (ICDI), an organization that sponsors well-drilling efforts in Central Africa
- In 2009, the group’s cover of the Coldplay song White Shadows was awarded a track on the Voices Only: The Best of College A Cappella compilation album
- In early 2014, the Bears were named champions of the Casino Theatre a cappella Invitational in Newport, RIun - unseating the Heightsmen of Boston College.

== Notable alumni ==
- Masi Oka, television and film actor, digital effects artist
