= A cappella =

Group or solo singing without instrumental sound

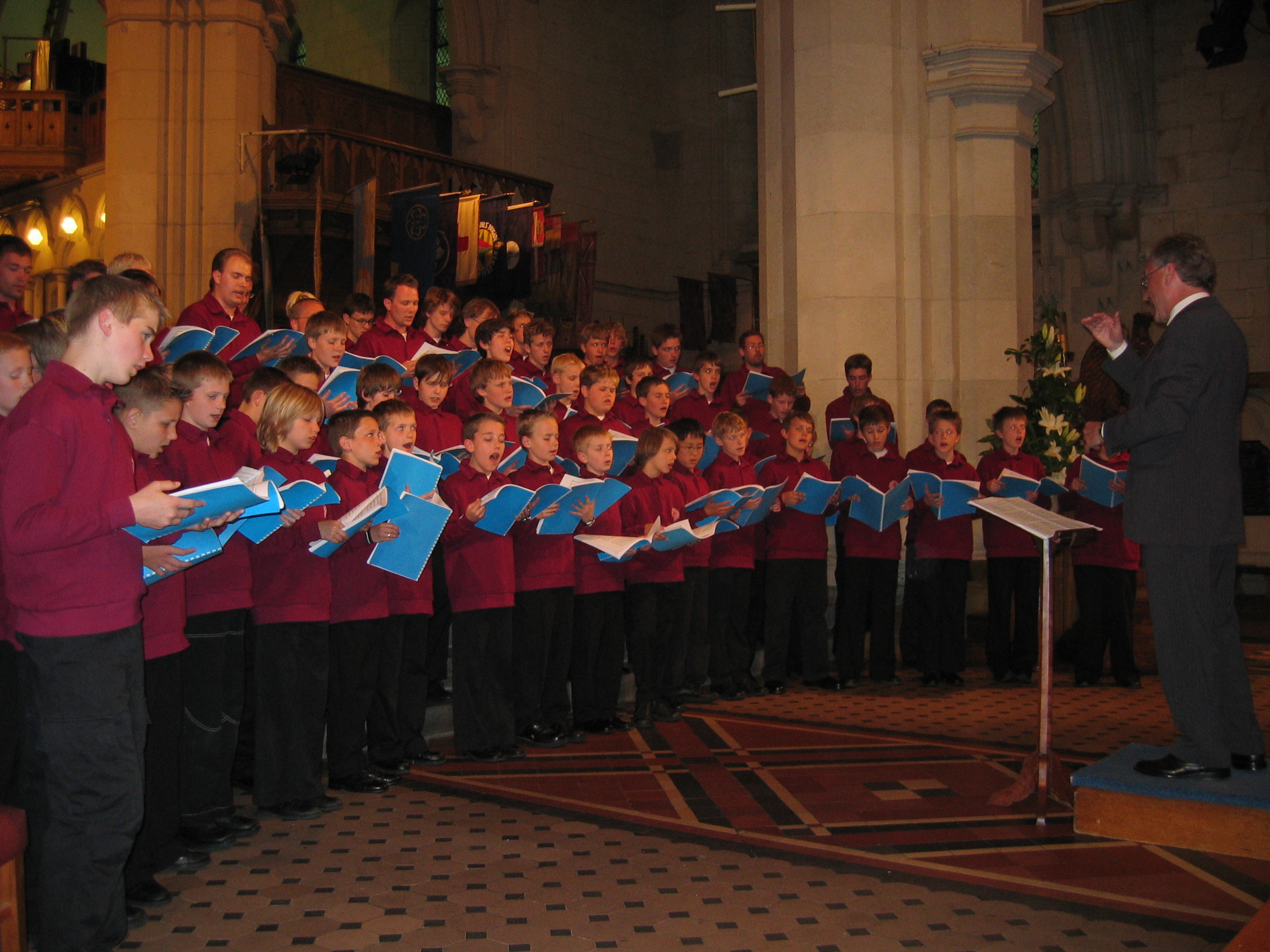
- Stylistic origins: Church music; Gregorian chant; madrigal
- Cultural origins: Pre-historical
- Typical instruments: None

Subgenres
- Barbershop music; collegiate a cappella; puirt à beul

Music performed a cappella (/ˌɑː kəˈpɛlə/ AH kə-PEL-ə, UK also /ˌæ kəˈpɛlə/ AK ə-PEL-ə; Italian: [a kkapˈpɛlla]; lit. 'in [the style of] the chapel'), less commonly spelled a capella in English, is a style of music performed by a singer or a singing group without any instrumental accompaniment. The term a cappella was originally intended to differentiate between Renaissance polyphonic and Baroque concertato musical styles. In the 19th century, a renewed interest in Renaissance polyphony, coupled with an ignorance of the fact that vocal parts were often doubled by instrumentalists, led to the term coming to mean unaccompanied vocal music. The term is also used, rarely, as a synonym for alla breve.

== Early history ==
Research suggests that singing and vocables may have been what early humans used to communicate before the invention of language. The earliest instructions for performing music were found on a cuneiform tablet from around 2000 BC, while the earliest that has survived in its entirety is from the first century AD: a piece from Greece called the Seikilos epitaph.

== Religious origins ==
A cappella music was originally used in religious music, especially church music as well as anasheed and zemirot. Gregorian chant is an example of a cappella singing, as is the majority of secular vocal music from the Renaissance. The madrigal, up until its development in the early Baroque into an instrumentally accompanied form, was also usually performed a cappella. Jewish and Early Christian music was largely a cappella, though instrument use subsequently increased in both religions as well as in Islam.

=== Christian ===
The polyphony of Christian (predominantly Catholic) a cappella music began to develop in Europe around the 9th century AD with the practice of organum, reaching its height between the 14th and 16th centuries with compositions by composers of the Franco-Flemish school (such as Guillaume Du Fay, Johannes Ockeghem, and Josquin des Prez). The early a cappella polyphonies were sometimes doubled with other instruments, which were often wind or string instruments, or organs. By the 16th century, a cappella polyphony had further developed, but gradually, the cantata began to take the place of a cappella forms. Sixteenth-century a cappella polyphony, nonetheless, continued to influence church composers throughout this period and to the present day. Recent evidence has shown that some of the early pieces by Palestrina, such as those written for the Sistine Chapel, were intended to be accompanied by an organ "doubling" for some or all of the voices.

Other composers that utilized the a cappella style, if only for the occasional piece, were Claudio Monteverdi and his Lagrime d'amante al sepolcro dell'amata (A lover's tears at his beloved's grave), composed in 1610, and Andrea Gabrieli when upon his death many choral pieces were discovered, one of which was in the unaccompanied style. Learning from the preceding two composers, Heinrich Schütz utilized the a cappella style in numerous pieces; chief among these were the pieces in the oratorio style, which were traditionally performed during the Easter week and dealt with the religious subject matter of that week, such as the Passion. Five of Schutz's Historien were Easter pieces, and of these the latter three, which dealt with the passion from three different viewpoints, those of Matthew, Luke and John, were all done a cappella style. The parts of the crowd were sung while the solo parts which were the quoted parts from either Christ or the authors were performed in a plainchant.

In the Byzantine Rite of the Eastern Orthodox Church, Eastern Lutheran Churches and the Eastern Catholic Churches, the music performed in the liturgies is exclusively sung without instrumental accompaniment. Early Russian musika which started appearing in the late 17th century, in what was known as khorovïye kontsertï (choral concertos) made a cappella adaptations of Venetian-styled pieces, such as the treatise, Grammatika musikiyskaya (1675), by Nikolai Diletsky. Divine Liturgies and Western Rite Masses composed by famous composers such as Peter Tchaikovsky, Sergei Rachmaninoff, Alexander Arkhangelsky, and Mykola Leontovych are examples.

Instruments have divided Christendom since their introduction into worship. They were considered a Roman Catholic innovation, not widely practiced until the 18th century, and were opposed vigorously in worship by a number of Protestant Reformers, including Martin Luther, Ulrich Zwingli, John Calvin, and John Wesley. Opponents of musical instruments in the Christian worship believe that such opposition is supported by the Christian scriptures and Church history. There is no reference to instrumental music in early church worship in the New Testament, or in the worship of churches for the first six centuries. Several reasons have been posited throughout church history for the absence of instrumental music in church worship. (Note: The absence of instrumental music is rooted in various hermeneutic principles (ways of interpreting the Bible) which determine what is appropriate for worship. Among such principles are the regulative principle of worship (Ulrich Zwingli), Sola scriptura (Martin Luther and Ulrich Zwingli), and the history of hymn.)

Those who do not adhere to the regulative principle of interpreting Christian scripture, believe that limiting praise to the unaccompanied chant of the early church is not commanded in scripture, and that churches in any age are free to offer their songs with or without musical instruments. Those who subscribe to this interpretation believe that since the Christian scriptures never counter instrumental language with any negative judgment on instruments, opposition to instruments instead comes from an interpretation of history. There is no written opposition to musical instruments in any setting in the first century and a half of Christian churches (33–180 AD). The use of instruments for Christian worship during this period is also undocumented. Toward the end of the 2nd century, Christians began condemning the instruments themselves. Those who oppose instruments today believe these Church Fathers had a better understanding of God's desire for the church, but there are significant differences between the teachings of these Church Fathers and Christian opposition to instruments today. Modern Christians typically believe it is acceptable to play instruments or to attend weddings, funerals, banquets, etc., where instruments are heard playing religious music. The Church Fathers made no exceptions. Since the New Testament never condemns instruments themselves, much less in any of these settings, author Everett Ferguson wrote that "the church Fathers go beyond the New Testament in pronouncing a negative judgment on musical instruments." Written opposition to instruments in worship began near the turn of the 5th century.

Since "a cappella" singing brought a new polyphony (more than one note at a time) with instrumental accompaniment, it is not surprising that Protestant reformers who opposed the instruments (such as Calvin and Zwingli) also opposed the polyphony. While Zwingli was destroying organs in Switzerland – Luther called him a fanatic – the Church of England was burning books of polyphony.

Some Holiness Methodist Churches such as the Free Methodist Church opposed the use of musical instruments in church worship until the mid-20th century. The Free Methodist Church allowed for local church decision on the use of either an organ or piano in the 1943 Conference before lifting the ban entirely in 1955. The Reformed Free Methodist Church and Evangelical Wesleyan Church were formed as a result of a schism with the Free Methodist Church, with the former retaining a cappella worship and the latter retaining the rule limiting the number of instruments in the church to the piano and organ. Present-day Christian religious bodies known for conducting their worship services without musical accompaniment include many Oriental Orthodox Churches (such as the Coptic Orthodox Church), many Anabaptist communities (including Old Order Anabaptist groups—such as the Amish, Old German Baptist Brethren, Old Order Mennonites, as well as Conservative Anabaptist groups—such as the Dunkard Brethren Church and Conservative Mennonites), some Presbyterian churches devoted to the regulative principle of worship, Old Regular Baptists, Primitive Baptists, Plymouth Brethren, Churches of Christ, Church of God, the Reformed Free Methodists, Doukhobors, and the Byzantine Rite of Eastern Christianity. Certain high church services and other musical events in liturgical churches (such as the Roman Catholic Mass and the Lutheran Divine Service) may be a cappella, a practice remaining from apostolic times. Many Mennonites also conduct some or all of their services without instruments. Sacred Harp, a type of folk music, is an a cappella style of religious singing with shape notes, usually sung at singing conventions.

=== Jewish ===
Traditional Jewish religious services did not include musical instruments given the practice of scriptural cantillation. The use of musical instruments is traditionally forbidden on the Sabbath out of concern that players would be tempted to repair (or tune) their instruments, which is forbidden on those days. (This prohibition has been relaxed in many Reform and some Conservative congregations.) Similarly, when Jewish families and larger groups sing traditional Sabbath songs known as zemirot outside the context of formal religious services, they usually do so a cappella, and Bar and Bat Mitzvah celebrations on the Sabbath sometimes feature entertainment by a cappella ensembles. During the Three Weeks musical instruments are prohibited. Many Jews consider a portion of the 49-day period of the counting of the omer between Passover and Shavuot to be a time of semi-mourning and instrumental music is not allowed during that time. This has led to a tradition of a cappella singing sometimes known as sefirah music.

The popularization of the Jewish chant may be found in the writings of the Jewish philosopher Philo, born 20 BC. Weaving together Jewish and Greek thought, Philo promoted praise without instruments, and taught that "silent singing" (without even vocal chords) was better still. The shofar is the only temple instrument still being used today in the synagogue, and it is only used from Rosh Chodesh Elul through the end of Yom Kippur. The shofar is used by itself, without any vocal accompaniment, and is limited to a very strictly defined set of sounds and specific places in the synagogue service.

== United States ==
Peter Christian Lutkin, dean of the Northwestern University School of Music, helped popularize a cappella music in the United States by founding the Northwestern A Cappella Choir in 1906. The A Cappella Choir was "the first permanent organization of its kind in America."

An a cappella tradition was begun in 1911 by F. Melius Christiansen, a music faculty member at St. Olaf College in Northfield, Minnesota. The St. Olaf College Choir was established as an outgrowth of the local St. John's Lutheran Church, where Christiansen was organist and the choir was composed, at least partially, of students from the nearby St. Olaf campus. The success of the ensemble was emulated by other regional conductors, and a tradition of a cappella choral music was born in the region at colleges like Concordia College (Moorhead, Minnesota), Augustana College (Rock Island, Illinois), Waldorf University (Forest City, Iowa), Luther College (Decorah, Iowa), Gustavus Adolphus College (St. Peter, Minnesota), Augustana College (Sioux Falls, South Dakota), and Augsburg University (Minneapolis, Minnesota). The choirs typically range from 40 to 80 singers and are recognized for their efforts to perfect blend, intonation, phrasing and pitch in a large choral setting.

Movements in modern a cappella over the past century include barbershop and doo-wop. Barbershop Harmony Society, SingUnited International, and Harmony, Incorporated host educational events including Harmony University, Directors University, and the International Educational Symposium, and international contests and conventions, recognizing international champion choruses and quartets.

Many a cappella groups can be found in high schools and colleges. There are amateur Barbershop Harmony Society and professional groups that sing a cappella exclusively. Although a cappella is technically defined as singing without instrumental accompaniment, some groups use their voices to emulate instruments; others are more traditional and focus on harmonizing. A cappella styles range from gospel music to contemporary to barbershop quartets and choruses.

The Contemporary A Cappella Society (CASA) is a membership option for former students, whose funds support hosted competitions and events.

A cappella music was popularized between the late 2000s and the early to mid-2010s with media hits such as the 2009–2014 TV show The Sing-Off and the musical comedy film series Pitch Perfect.

=== Recording artists ===
In July 1943, as a result of the American Federation of Musicians boycott of US recording studios, the a cappella vocal group The Song Spinners had a best-seller with "Comin' In on a Wing and a Prayer". In the 1950s, several recording groups, notably The Hi-Los and the Four Freshmen, introduced complex jazz harmonies to a cappella performances. The King's Singers are credited with promoting interest in small-group a cappella performances in the 1960s. Frank Zappa loved doo wop and a cappella, so Zappa released The Persuasions' first album from his label in 1970. Judy Collins recorded "Amazing Grace" a cappella. In 1983, an a cappella group known as The Flying Pickets had a Christmas 'number one' in the UK with a cover of Yazoo's (known in the US as Yaz) "Only You". A cappella music attained renewed prominence from the late 1980s onward, spurred by the success of Top 40 recordings by artists such as The Manhattan Transfer, Bobby McFerrin, Huey Lewis and the News, All-4-One, The Nylons, Backstreet Boys, Boyz II Men, and *NSYNC.

Contemporary a cappella includes many vocal groups and bands who add vocal percussion or beatboxing to create a pop/rock/gospel sound, in some cases very similar to bands with instruments. Examples of such professional groups include Straight No Chaser, Pentatonix, The House Jacks, Rockapella, Mosaic, Home Free, M-pact, and VoicePlay. There also remains a strong a cappella presence within Christian music, as some denominations purposefully do not use instruments during worship. Examples of such groups are Take 6, Glad and Acappella. Arrangements of popular music for small a cappella ensembles typically include one voice singing the lead melody, one singing a rhythmic bass line, and the remaining voices contributing chordal or polyphonic accompaniment.

A cappella can also describe the isolated vocal track(s) from a multitrack recording that originally included instrumentation. These vocal tracks may be remixed or put onto vinyl records for DJs, or released to the public so that fans can remix them. One such example is the a cappella release of Jay-Z's Black Album, which Danger Mouse mixed with the Beatles' White Album to create The Grey Album.

On their 1966 album titled Album, Peter, Paul and Mary included the song "Norman Normal". All the sounds on that song, both vocals and instruments, were created by Paul's voice, with no actual instruments used.

In 2013, an artist by the name Smooth McGroove rose to prominence with his style of a cappella music. He is best known for his a cappella covers of video game music tracks on YouTube.

in 2015, an a cappella version of Jerusalem by multi-instrumentalist Jacob Collier was selected for Beats by Dre "The Game Starts Here" for the England Rugby World Cup campaign.

=== Musical theatre ===
A cappella has been used as the sole orchestration for original works of musical theatre that have had commercial runs Off-Broadway (theatres in New York City with 99 to 500 seats) only four times. The first was Avenue X which opened on 28 January 1994, and ran for 77 performances. It was produced by Playwrights Horizons with book by John Jiler, music and lyrics by Ray Leslee. The musical style of the show's score was primarily doo-wop as the plot revolved around doo-wop group singers of the 1960s.

In 2001, The Kinsey Sicks, produced and starred in the critically acclaimed off-Broadway hit, DRAGAPELLA! Starring the Kinsey Sicks at New York's Studio 54. That production received a nomination for a Lucille Lortel award as Best Musical and a Drama Desk nomination for Best Lyrics. It was directed by Glenn Casale with original music and lyrics by Ben Schatz.

The a cappella musical Perfect Harmony, a comedy about two high school a cappella groups vying to win the national championship, made its Off Broadway debut at Theatre Row's Acorn Theatre on 42nd Street in New York City in October 2010 after a successful out-of-town run at the Stoneham Theatre, in Stoneham, Massachusetts. Perfect Harmony features the hit music of The Jackson 5, Pat Benatar, Billy Idol, Marvin Gaye, Scandal, Tiffany, The Romantics, The Pretenders, The Temptations, The Contours, The Commodores, Tommy James & the Shondells and The Partridge Family, and has been compared to a cross between Altar Boyz and The 25th Annual Putnam County Spelling Bee.

The fourth a cappella musical to appear Off-Broadway, In Transit, premiered October 5, 2010, and was produced by Primary Stages with book, music, and lyrics by Kristen Anderson-Lopez, James-Allen Ford, Russ Kaplan, and Sara Wordsworth. Set primarily in the New York City subway system its score features an eclectic mix of musical genres (including jazz, hip hop, Latin, rock, and country). In Transit incorporates vocal beat boxing into its contemporary a cappella arrangements through the use of a subway beat boxer character. Beat boxer and actor Chesney Snow performed this role for the 2010 Primary Stages production. According to the show's website, it is scheduled to reopen for an open-ended commercial run in the Fall of 2011. In 2011, the production received four Lucille Lortel Award nominations including Outstanding Musical, Outer Critics Circle and Drama League nominations, as well as five Drama Desk nominations including Outstanding Musical and won for Outstanding Ensemble Performance. In December 2016, In Transit became the first a cappella musical on Broadway.

=== Barbershop style ===
Barbershop music is one of several uniquely American art forms that involve cappella music as well as African American singers. The earliest documented quartets all began in barber shops. In 1938, the first formal men's barbershop organization was formed, known as the Society for the Preservation and Encouragement of Barber Shop Quartet Singing in America (S.P.E.B.S.Q.S.A), and in 2004 rebranded itself and officially changed its public name to the Barbershop Harmony Society (BHS). Today, BHS has about 22,000 members in approximately 800 chapters across the United States and Canada, and the barbershop style has spread around the world with organizations in many other countries. The Barbershop Harmony Society provides a highly organized competition structure for a cappella quartets and choruses singing in the barbershop style.

In 1945, the first formal women's barbershop organization, Sweet Adelines, was formed. In 1953, Sweet Adelines became an international organization, although it did not change its name to Sweet Adelines International until 1991 and subsequently changed its name to SingUnited International in 2026. The membership of nearly 25,000 women, all singing in English, includes choruses in most of the fifty United States as well as in Australia, Canada, Finland, Germany, Ireland, Japan, New Zealand, Spain, Sweden, the United Kingdom, and the Netherlands. Headquartered in Tulsa, Oklahoma, the organization encompasses more than 1,200 registered quartets and 600 choruses. In 1959, a second women's barbershop organization started. Based on democratic principles which continue to this day, Harmony, Incorporated is smaller than its counterpart, but has an atmosphere of friendship and competition. With over 2,000 members in the United States and Canada, Harmony, Inc. uses the same rules in contest that the Barbershop Harmony Society uses.

=== Amateur and high school ===
High school groups may have conductors or student leaders who keep the tempo for the group, or beatboxers/vocal percussionists.

Since 2013, summer training programs have appeared, such as A Cappella Academy in Los Angeles, California (founded by Ben Bram, Rob Dietz, and Avi Kaplan) and Camp A Cappella in Dayton, Ohio (founded by Deke Sharon and Brody McDonald). These programs teach about different aspects of a cappella music, including vocal performance, arranging, and beatboxing/vocal percussion.

=== Collegiate ===
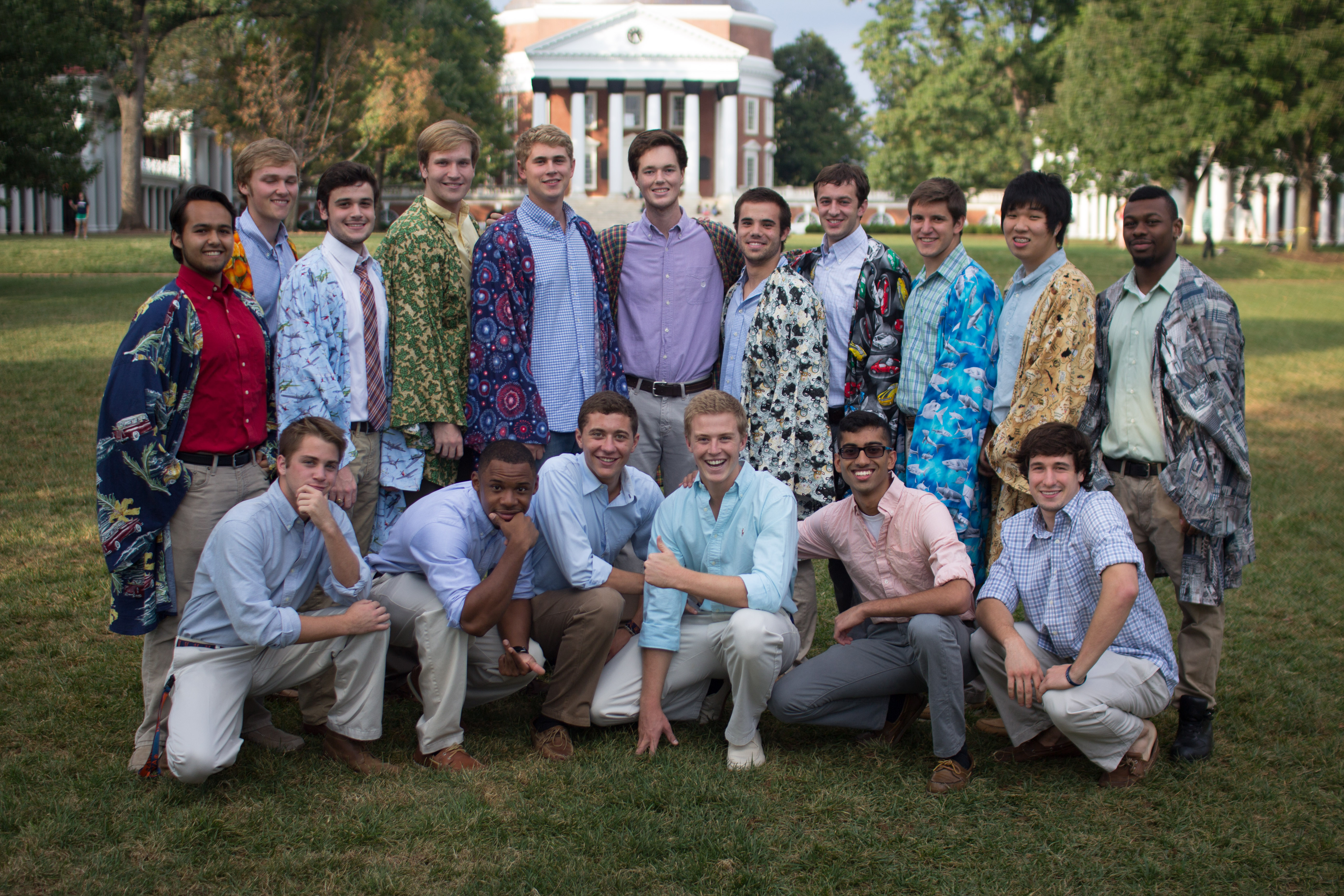
The Hullabahoos, an a cappella group at the University of Virginia, were featured in the movie Pitch Perfect.

The Rensselyrics of Rensselaer Polytechnic Institute (formerly known as the RPI Glee Club), established in 1873, is perhaps the oldest known collegiate a cappella group. The longest continuously singing group is likely The Whiffenpoofs of Yale University, which formed in 1909 and once included Cole Porter as a member. Collegiate a cappella groups grew throughout the 20th century. Some notable all-male historical groups include Colgate University's The Colgate 13 (1942), Dartmouth College's Aires (1946), Harvard University's Krokodiloes (1946), Cornell University's Cayuga's Waiters (1949) and The Hangovers (1968), the University of Maine Maine Steiners (1958), the Columbia University Kingsmen (1949), the Jabberwocks of Brown University (1949), and the University of Rochester YellowJackets (1956).

All-women a cappella groups followed shortly, with names frequently parodying men's groups: the Smiffenpoofs of Smith College (1936), the Night Owls of Vassar College (1942), The Shwiffs of Connecticut College (1944), and The Chattertocks of Brown University (1951).

A cappella groups exploded in popularity beginning in the 1990s, fueled in part by a change in style popularized by the Tufts University Beelzebubs and the Boston University Dear Abbeys. The new style used voices to emulate modern rock instruments, including vocal percussion/"beatboxing". Some larger universities now have multiple groups. Groups join one another in on-campus concerts, such as the Georgetown Chimes' Cherry Tree Massacre, a 3-weekend a cappella festival held each February since 1975, where over a hundred collegiate groups have appeared, as well as International Quartet Champions The Boston Common and the contemporary commercial a cappella group Rockapella.

Co-ed groups have produced many up-and-coming and major artists, including John Legend, an alumnus of the Counterparts at the University of Pennsylvania, Sara Bareilles, an alumna of Awaken A Cappella at University of California, Los Angeles, Mindy Kaling, an alumna of the Rockapellas at Dartmouth College, and Mira Sorvino, an alumna of the Harvard-Radcliffe Veritones of Harvard University.

Jewish-interest groups such as Queens College's Tizmoret, Tufts University's Shir Appeal, University of Chicago's Rhythm and Jews, Binghamton University's Kaskeset, Ohio State University's Meshuganotes, Rutgers University's Kol Halayla, New York University's Ani V'Ata, and University of California, Los Angeles's Jewkbox are also gaining popularity across the U.S.

Increased interest in modern a cappella (particularly collegiate a cappella) can be seen in the growth of awards such as the Contemporary A Cappella Recording Awards (overseen by the Contemporary A Cappella Society) and competitions such as the International Championship of Collegiate A Cappella for college groups and the Harmony Sweepstakes for all groups. In December 2009, a new television competition series called The Sing-Off aired on NBC. The show featured eight a cappella groups from the United States and Puerto Rico vying for the prize of $100,000 and a recording contract with Epic Records/Sony Music. The show was judged by Ben Folds, Shawn Stockman, and Nicole Scherzinger and was won by an all-male group from Puerto Rico called Nota. The show returned for a second, third, fourth, and fifth season, won by Committed, Pentatonix, Home Free, and The Melodores from Vanderbilt University respectively.

Each year, hundreds of collegiate a cappella groups submit their strongest songs in a competition to be on The Best of College A Cappella (BOCA), an album compilation of tracks from the best college a cappella groups around the world. The album is produced by Varsity Vocals ,which also produces the International Championship of Collegiate A Cappella , and Deke Sharon. Collegiate a cappella groups also submit their tracks to Voices Only, a two-disc series released annually since 2005. From 2014 to 2019, the Women's A Cappella Association (WACA) produced an annual best of women's a cappella album.

=== A cappella in popular culture ===
The popularity of a cappella was revived by television shows and movies such as Glee and Pitch Perfect, with the latter being more a cappella-focused than the former, whose focus lies more on traditional musical theater. Since the release of Pitch Perfect in late 2012, the amount of coed a cappella groups has risen far more sharply than in the years prior.

== Globally ==
=== Afghanistan ===
The Islamic Emirate of Afghanistan has no official anthem because of views by the Taliban of music as prohibited ("haram"). However, the de facto national anthem of Afghanistan is an a cappella nasheed, as musical instruments are virtually banned and are seen as corrupting and un-Islamic.

=== Australia ===
Australia saw a rise in a cappella groups during the 1980s and 1990s with groups such as Blindman's Holiday, Arramaeida, Martenitsa Choir, Cafe at the Gate of Salvation, and the Heavenly Light Quartet. Vocal music and community choirs have become popular in most towns and suburbs of Australia since 2010, with regular concerts, events and festivals dedicated solely to vocal music performances.

=== Iran ===
The first a cappella group in Iran is the Damour Vocal Band, which was able to perform on national television despite a ban on women singing.

=== Pakistan ===
The musical show Strepsils Stereo is credited for introducing the art of a cappella in Pakistan.

=== Sri Lanka ===
Composer Dinesh Subasinghe became the first Sri Lankan to write a cappella pieces for SATB choirs. He wrote "The Princes of the Lost Tribe" and "Ancient Queen of Somawathee" for Menaka De Sahabandu and Bridget Helpe's choirs, respectively, based on historical incidents in ancient Sri Lanka. Voice Print is also a professional a cappella music group in Sri Lanka.

=== Sweden ===
The European a cappella tradition is strong in the countries around the Baltic, including in Sweden as described by Richard Sparks in The Swedish Choral Miracle in 2000. Swedish a cappella choirs have over the last 25 years won around 25% of the annual prestigious European Grand Prix for Choral Singing (EGP) that despite its name is open to choirs from all over the world (see list of laureates in the Wikipedia article on the EGP competition). Sparks explains that in Sweden an unusually large proportion of the populations (5% is often cited) regularly sing in choirs. He also states the Swedish choral director Eric Ericson had an enormous impact on a cappella choral development not only in Sweden but around the world, and finally there are a large number of very popular primary and secondary schools ('music schools') with high admission standards based on auditions that combine academic requirements with high level choral singing, a system that started with Adolf Fredrik's Music School in Stockholm in 1939 but has spread over the country.

=== United Kingdom ===
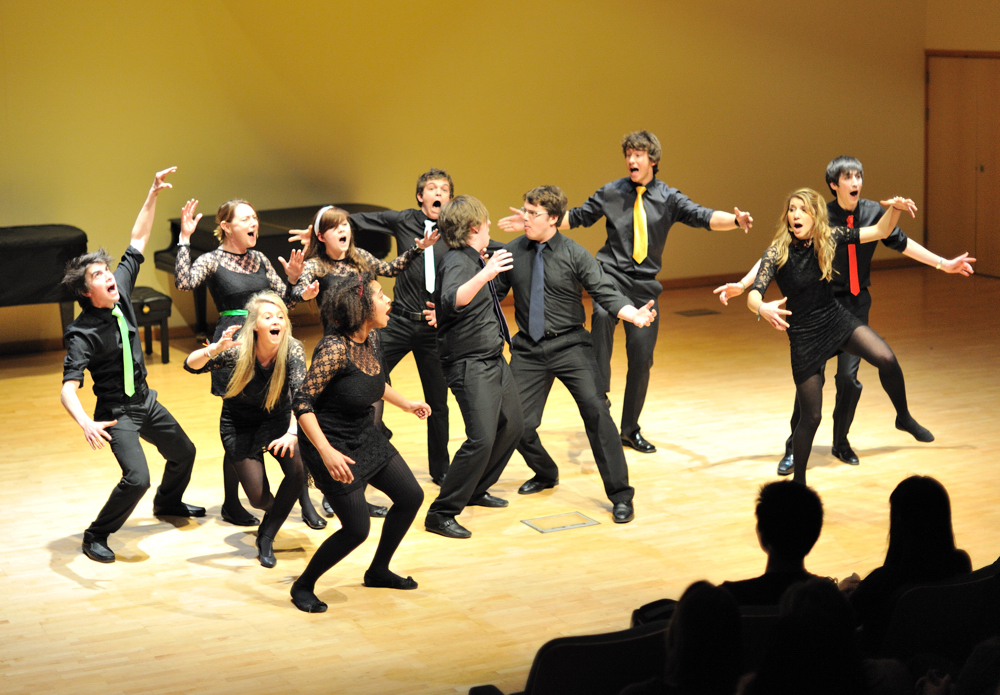
The Oxford Alternotives, the oldest a cappella group at the University of Oxford in the UK

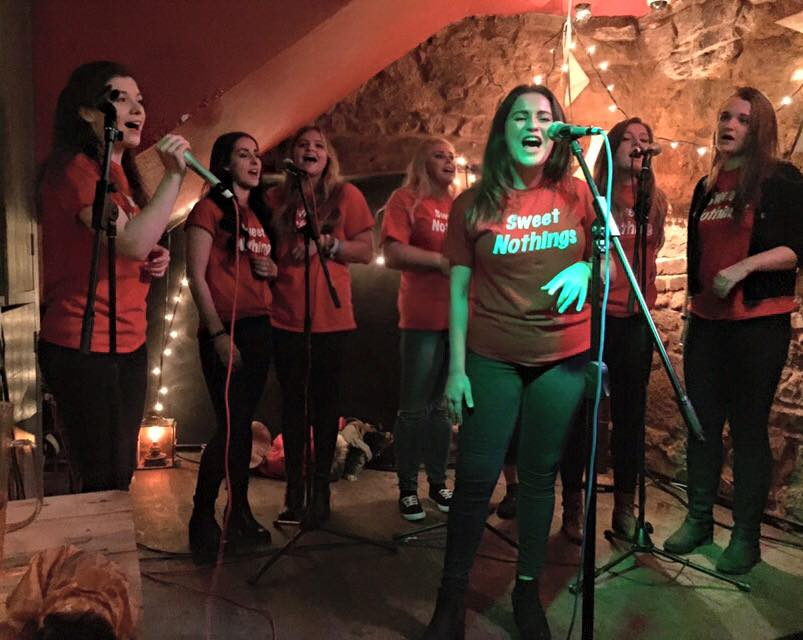
The Sweet Nothings are one of the University of Exeter's eight a cappella groups. They are one of the oldest and most successful girl groups in the UK.

In British universities, there are numerous a capella groups. UK a capella organisations include The Voice Festival UK and the integration of the United Kingdom into the International Championship of Collegiate A Cappella.

=== South Asian ===
South Asian a cappella features a fusion of music from the Indian subcontinent, which places it in the category of South Asian fusion music. A cappella is gaining popularity among South Asians with the emergence of primarily Hindi-English college groups. The first South Asian a cappella group was Penn Masala, an all-male group founded in 1996 at the University of Pennsylvania. The first co-ed South Asian a cappella was Anokha, from the University of Maryland, formed in 2001. The first South Asian A Cappella competition was "Anahat," hosted by the Indus student organization at the University of California, Berkeley. Maize Mirchi, the co-ed a cappella group from the University of Michigan became the first South Asian group to advance to ICCA finals in 2023.

The South Asian a cappella competitive circuit is governed by the Association of South-Asian A Cappella (ASA), a non-profit organization formed in 2016. The competitive circuit consists of qualifier "bid" competitions all over the United States, as well as the national championship, All-American Awaaz. The first winner of the championship title was Swaram A Cappella at Texas A&M University, who won 1st place at All-American Awaaz in 2017 in New York City as well as in 2018 in Chicago. Dhamakapella currently holds the record for most All-American Awaaz championships, winning three consecutive championships in 2022, 2023, and 2024.

== Emulating instruments ==
In addition to singing words, some a cappella singers also emulate instrumentation by reproducing instrumental sounds with their vocal cords and mouth, often pitched using specialised pitch pipes. One of the earliest 20th century practitioners of this method were The Mills Brothers. More recently, "Twilight Zone" by 2 Unlimited was sung a cappella to the instrumentation on the comedy television series Tompkins Square. Another famous example of emulating instrumentation instead of singing the words is the theme song for The New Addams Family series on Fox Family Channel (now Freeform). Groups such as Vocal Sampling emulate Latin rhythms a cappella. In the 1960s, the Swingle Singers used their voices to emulate musical instruments to Baroque and Classical music. Vocal artist Bobby McFerrin is famous for his instrumental emulation. A cappella group Naturally Seven recreates entire songs using vocal tones for every instrument.

Beatboxing, more accurately known as vocal percussion, is a technique used in a cappella music popularized by the hip-hop community, where rap is often performed a cappella. The advent of vocal percussion has become prevalent in modern arrangements.

== See also ==
- Lists of a cappella groups
  - List of professional a cappella groups
  - List of collegiate a cappella groups in the United States
  - List of university a cappella groups in the United Kingdom
