= Michael B. Polk =

American businessman

- Born: 1960 or 1961 (age 65–66)
- Education: Cornell University; Harvard Business School
- Occupation: Businessman
- Title: former CEO, Newell Brands
- Term: 2011-2019

Michael B. Polk (born 1960/61) is an American businessman, and was the chief executive officer (CEO) of Newell Brands from 2011 until his retirement in 2019. He also held positions at Kraft Foods and Unilever.

== Education ==
Polk earned a bachelor's degree in operations research and industrial engineering from Cornell University, where he sang with the Cornell University Glee Club and The Hangovers, and an MBA from Harvard Business School.

In 2016, Polk delivered the 28th annual Lewis H. Durland Memorial Lecture at Cornell.

== Career ==
Polk joined Kraft Foods in 1987 and has held marketing positions in the company’s coffee/beverages businesses. In 1998, he was named Executive Vice President and General Manager of the Post cereals brand. In January 2000, he assumed leadership of the Asia Pacific Region for the company.

In 2001, Kraft Foods named Polk Group Vice President, Kraft Foods North America, and President of the Nabisco Biscuit & Snacks Group.

In 2011, Newell Brands appointed Polk to the position of CEO. Before this, Polk was President of Global Foods, Home, and Personal Care at Unilever, where he was in charge of developing and marketing Unilever’s entire portfolio.

In March 2019, Newell Brands announced that Polk would retire at the end of the second quarter.

In June 2019, Chris Peterson, chief financial officer (CFO) was appointed as interim CEO.

In 2020, Polk returned to work as an Advisory Director of Berkshire Partners and the CEO of one of the Private Equity firm's portfolio companies, Implus LLC. Implus produces athletic, fitness, and outdoor accessories.
