= The Brown Derbies =

American a cappella group

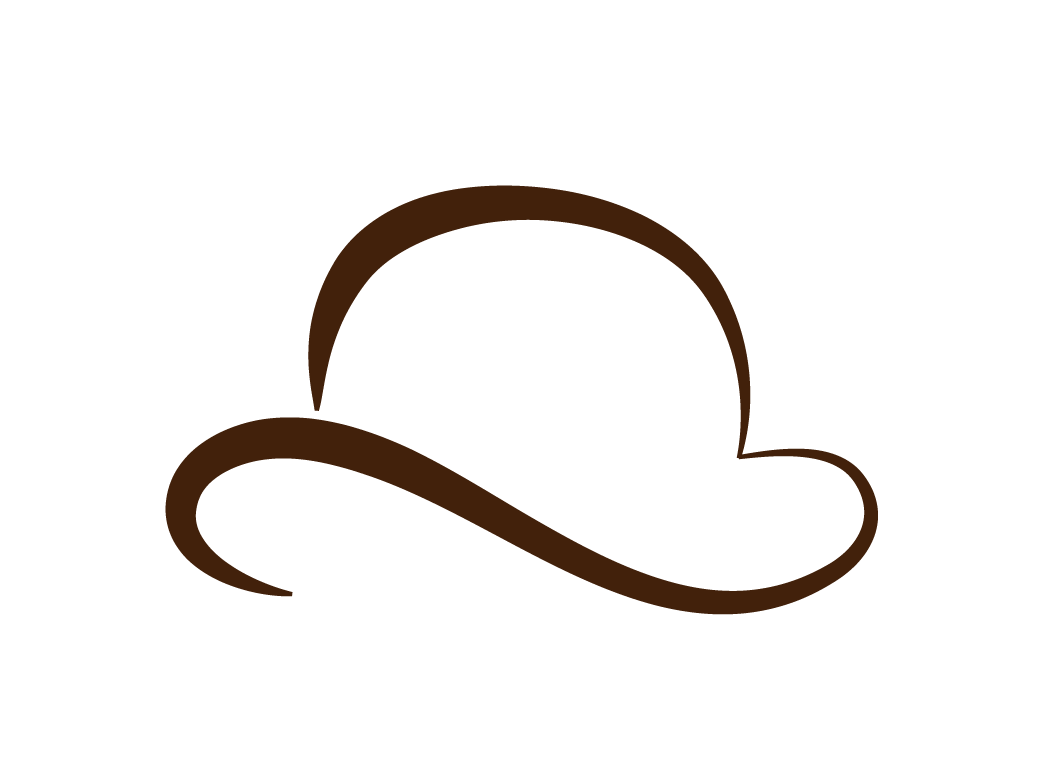
- The Brown Derbies' Logo

Background information
- Also known as: The Derbies
- Origin: Brown University, Providence, Rhode Island, United States
- Genre: Collegiate a cappella
- Years active: 1982–present
- Label: Collegiate
- Members: Yul Ahn '26.5; Bruce Yanovitch '27; Daniel Ma '27; Grant Weihs '27; Jake Delesky '27; Rohan Menon '27; Vivek Pall-Pareek '27; Noam Medjuck-Bruckner ‘28; Owen Vaccaro '28; Rohan Panjwani ‘28; Miles Kaludzinski '28; Derin Gurses '29; Isaac Kho '29; Bruno Kim '29; JJ Rodriguez '30; Marcus Hulbig '30; Daniel Jin '30; Amal Bhattacharya '30; Victor Essoka '30; Brenn Farrell '30; Nate Gale '30
- Past members: Benjamin Bradley '26; Mikai Spencer '26; Xavier Dargan '26; Sohum Sanu '25; Aidan LeBlanc '25; Arata Fujii '25; Chris Pollack '25; Michael DeLaurier '25; Cottrell Van Wingerden '24; Charles Levy '24; Brayson Freeman '24; Zachary Lin '24; Arian Fesharaki '23; Brett Starr '23; Aidan Wood '23; Andrés Beck-Ruiz '23; Cole Exline '22; Andrew Alper '22; Ben Michaels '22; Michael Saracco '21; JD Calvelli '21; Ved Narayan '21; Amit Chakrabarti '21; Aakash Setty '21; Leonardo Ko '20; Daniel Traver '20; Vinu Raman '20; John Rush '20; Nathaniel Nguyen '20; Justin Chen '20; Kevin Cowles '19; Corey Mirrison '19; Iladro Sauls '19; Pratul Tandon '18.5; Ricardo Jaramillo '18.5; Keegan Quigley '18; Oliver Hu '18; Duane Barksdale '17; Rohan Chandra '17; Ray Holden '17; David Cohen '16.5; Derek Shay '16; Daniel Wilhite '16; Ryan Joudeh '16; Russyan Mabeza '15; Campbell Housh '15; Jaff Baum '15; Noah Lubin '15; Christian Petroske '15; Drew Hansen '15; Tim Parsons '14; Matt Slouson '14; Josh Linden '14; Adam Katz '14; Clarence Lam '14; Nate Wardwell '14; Raghava Kamalesh '14; Sam Phelps '13; Lex Rofeberg '13; Justin Klee '13; Augustin Boxler '12; Robert Warner '11; Benjamin Simon '11; Ari Rubenstein '11; Sam Yong Han '11; Hadley Horing '11; Matthew Garza '11; Amos Budde '10; Don Flynn '10; Mike Mochizuki '10; Joshua Leight '09; Zachary Langway '09; Adam Robbins '09; Carlos Ormachea '09; David Leipziger '09; Stephan Wollenburg '09; Olin Gay '08; Anthony Roggio '08; Piet Walvoord '08; Michael Hammond '08; Curtis Steyers '07; Michael Racine '07; Danny Lee '07; Andrew Baum '07; Kent Haines '07; David Greis '07; Kevin Scott '06; Steve Love '06; Patrick Rowe '06; Michael Oneppo '05; Brian Fujimoto '05; Aaron Prosnitz '05; Jeremy I Medow '05; Adam Bowker '04; Todd Goldstein '04; Lance Rubin '04; Christopher Yim '04; Jeb Havens '03; David Zaretsky '03; Justin Antos '03; Arthur Hur '03; Matthew Moscardi '02; Michael Stanton '02; Joshua Landay '02; Stefan Karlsson '02; Matthew Tanzer '02; Nicholas Moy '02; Nishant Menon '02; Daniel Acheson '01; Benjamin Steinfeld '01; Marcos Santiago '01; Matthew Schmidt '00; Jeremy Gough '00; James Ahn Jr. '99; Jared Schmidt '99; Adam Arian '99; Jonathan Frank '99; Benjamin Reardon '99; Raj Patil '99; Keith Getchell '98; Gabriel Schifman '98; Peter Tsai '98; Edward Chen '98; Jeffrey Falk '98; Joel Begleiter '98; Taylor Margis-Noguera '97; Rodolfo Fernandez '97; Joshua Siegel '97; Abelardo Fernandez '97; Evan Schiff '97; Windy Chin '96; Frank McLellan '96; Andrew Portnoy '96; Rich Canedo '96; Sasha Olinick '96; Kevin Bau '95; Adam Werbach '95; Scott Paley '95; Erich Fisher '95; Michael Portnoy '94; Rick Cusick '94; J.T. Atwood '94; Isaac Hazard '94; Adam Farb '94; Christopher Brown '94; Aaron Presbrey '93; Nicholas Sanders '93; David Jacobs '93; Trond Grenager '93; Seth Newman '93; Peter Bulova '92; Jason Neulander '91; Scott Hunter '91; Simon Tiller '91; C. Adam Ludwig '90; Eric Yap '90; Michael Chesek '90; Joel Gantcher '90; Fred Elliott-Hart '90; Daniel Fennell '89; Brian McKaig '89; James McNamera '89; Mitchell Albert '89; Mark Bayliss '88; John Manzon-Santon '88; Mark Henderson '87; David Greenberg '87; Jonathan Schaffir '87; Scott Flemming '87; Joseph Copeland '87; Clark Bender '87; Jose Aguto Jr. John Song '86; Davis Guggenheim '86; William Stern '86; Christopher King '86; Ian Todreas '86; Neal Brown '86; Gary Oxford '85; Darryl Shrock '86; Stephen Thompson '84
- Website: Official Site

The Brown Derbies is an a cappella group at Brown University. They were founded by Darryl Shrock in 1982 and have released fifteen albums. They sing a variety of different genres, ranging from Rock, to Pop, to R&B and are known in the a cappella community for their unique use of syllables in the background vocals. They have toured throughout the United States and internationally, with recent performances in Beijing, Shanghai, London, Paris, Barcelona, Singapore, and Tokyo. In 1997, the group performed for President Bill Clinton at the White House. In November 2007, they were featured on the CBS Early Show in a segment about the rising popularity of a cappella groups on college campuses, and in July 2011 they were featured on the Gospel Music Channel reality show America Sings. In January 2012, they performed in the London A Cappella Festival.

The Derbies are known for incorporating humor and choreography into many of their live performances. An annual tradition is performing with the Chattertocks in their annual concert, "Smoked Salomon," which occurs every September in Salomon Hall on the Brown University campus. Their sister a cappella group is the Smith Smiffenpoofs.

== Awards ==
The Derbies' fourth album, "Down Time," was first runner-up for Best Male Collegiate Album in the 1995 CARAs. Their next album, "Nightcap," swept the CARAs, winning Best Male Collegiate Album (though tied with the Middlebury Dissipated Eight's "Eighps"), Best Male Collegiate Song ("In the House of Stone & Light"), Best Male Collegiate Arrangement ("Who Are You?" arr. Evan Schiff), and Best Male Collegiate Soloist (Joel Begleiter on "The Downeaster Alexa"). The Derbies kept their streak alive on their next album, "Jericho," which also placed in all four categories of the 2000 CARAs. They tied in the category of Best Male Collegiate Album again, this time with the Tufts Beelzebubs' "Infinity." They won Best Male Collegiate Song ("I Wanna Be Like You") and Best Male Collegiate Arrangement (Raj Patil) and received first runner-up for Best Male Collegiate Soloist (Marcos Santiago, who was competing in the five-person category with fellow Derby Keith Getchell).

The Derbies have also been recognized formally for their live performances by the ICCA. In 1996, they were first runner-up in the New England Region in the Semifinals and also got runner-up for Best Arrangement ("Who Are You?" arr. Evan Schiff). The same piece won Best Arrangement at the Quarterfinals the same year. In 1997, they were crowned champions of the Northeast region at the ICCA Semifinals, where they also won Best Solo (Adam Arian, "Who Are You?"). They received the award for Best Arrangement ("In the House of Stone & Light," Raj Patil) earlier in the tournament at the Quarterfinals. In 2013, the group competed in the ICCA for the first time in over a decade, advancing to the semifinals.

The Brown Derbies have appeared on several collegiate a cappella compilation albums. "In Your Eyes," from the Derby album "Down Time," was featured on the Best of College A Cappella: Volume 1. "In the House of Stone & Light" was selected for the BOCA '97-'98 album and "Telephone Message" (Mentos Edition) made it on to "BOCA Humor: Wasting Our Parents' Money." Most recently, "Happier," from the Derby Album "To Be Determined," earned a spot on BOCA 2020.

== Albums ==
- Derby Laundry (1986)
- Talk Derby to Me (1991)
- Hat Trick (1993)
- Down Time (1994)
- Nightcap (1997)
- Jericho (1999)
  - "This album ought to be required listening for any college group planning to record." - RARB Review
- Hybrid (2002)
  - "These guys are supremely musical — a real treat on a rock-intensive album." - RARB Review
- Recap (2004)
- We Deliver (2007)
- Ridin' Derby (2008)
- Nice Guys, Better Guests (2011)
- Derbyhaus (2014)
  - "Lovers in Rome" from Derbyhaus nominated for 2015 Contemporary A Cappella Recording Award (CARA) for Best Male Collegiate Arrangement
- Unaccounted For (2017)
- To Be Determined (2019)
  - "Happier" from To Be Determined is featured on Best of College A Cappella (BOCA) 2020
- Melvin's Room (2022)
- Hats Off (2024)

== Notable alumni ==
- Adam Farb, co-founder of the International Championship of Collegiate A Cappella
- Todd Goldstein, former guitarist of the Harlem Shakes and current guitarist/vocalist of ARMS.
- Davis Guggenheim, Oscar-winning director of An Inconvenient Truth.
- Kent Haines, stand-up comedian.
- Andrew Baum, Chairman of Emergency Medicine
- Joel Begleiter, talent agent for CAA
- Joasaph McLellan, Head of the Russian Ecclesiastical Mission in Jerusalem.
- Lance Rubin, actor and Upright Citizens Brigade Theatre performer.
- Adam Werbach, environmental activist.
- A. Gabriel Schifman, Director of Pediatric Emergency Medicine
