= Collegiate a cappella =

College-affiliated singing groups

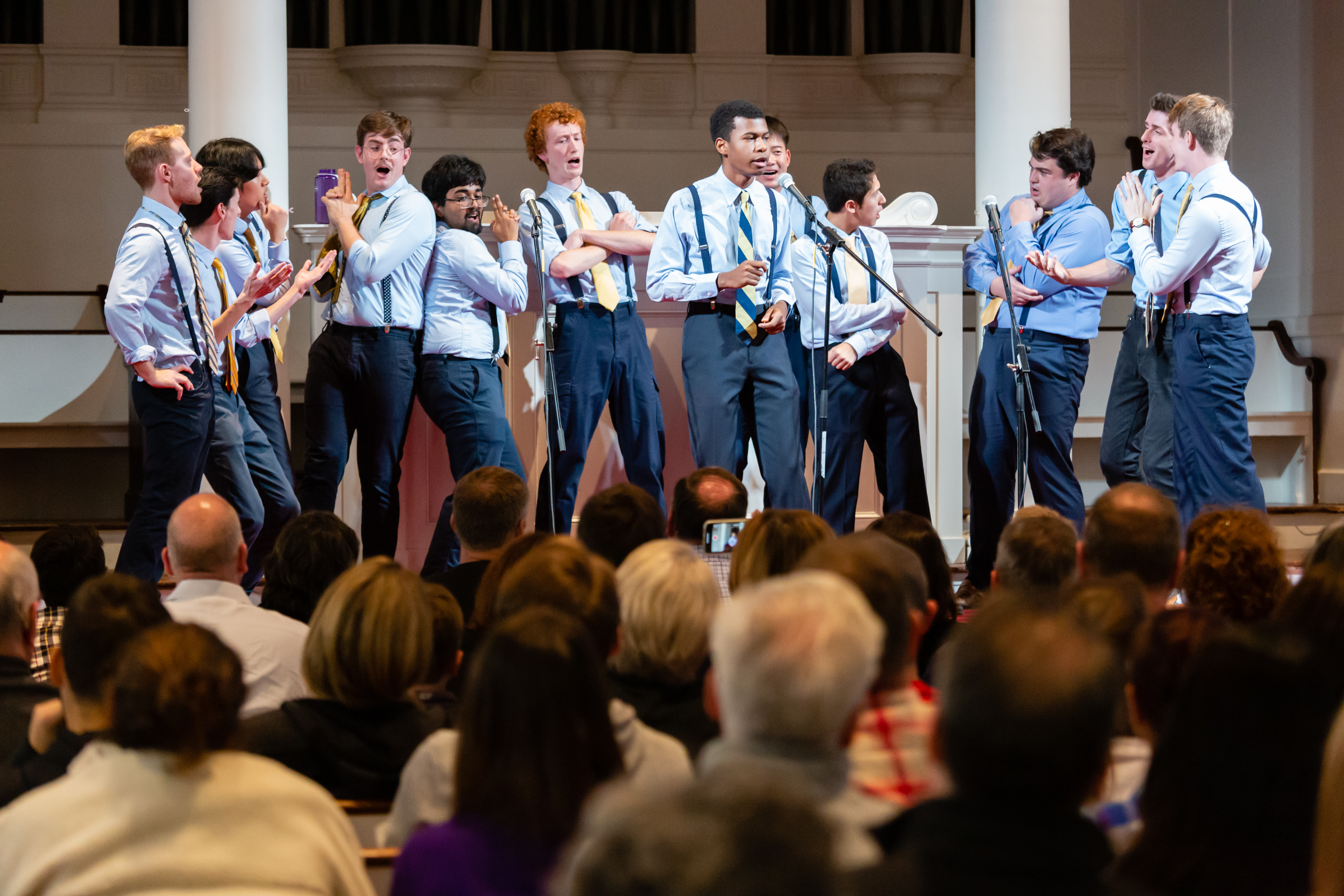
- Amherst College's Route 9
- Etymology: Italian alla cappella (“in the manner of the [Sistine] chapel”), referring to non-instrumental choirs; from Latin a-, ad, "to", + cappella, "chapel"
- Stylistic origins: Glee clubs, A cappella
- Cultural origins: Early 1900s Northeastern United States

Collegiate a cappella (or college a cappella) ensembles are college-affiliated singing groups, primarily in the United States, and, increasingly, the United Kingdom and Ireland, that perform entirely without musical instruments. The groups are typically composed of, operated by, and directed by students. In the context of collegiate a cappella, the term a cappella typically also refers to the music genre performed by pop-centric student singing groups. Consequently, an ensemble that sings unaccompanied classical music may not be considered an a cappella group, even though technically it is performing a cappella.

According to the nonfiction book Pitch Perfect, a cappella music is one of the oldest forms of music in existence, "the kind made without any accompaniment at all," and descended from the tradition of Gregorian chant. A cappella music as a form joined this early form with a later Puritan style, known as shape-note singing, which further extended into the American Gospel tradition. Further permutations leaked into the American pop landscape. Today, by some accounts, there exist as many as “twelve hundred collegiate a cappella groups in the United States alone.”

== History ==
=== Early history ===
The RPI Glee Club of Rensselaer Polytechnic Institute, established in 1873, was one of the earliest known collegiate a cappella groups. The longest continuously operating group is thought to be The Whiffenpoofs of Yale University, which was formed in 1909 to create a musical group with a more "modern" sound than that of the Yale Glee Club, and named for the lyrics to Little Nemo, a popular Broadway song at the time. Such names, normally intended for comedic effect, have come to define in some part the irreverent attitude found in modern collegiate a cappella. For example, the second-oldest continuously performing a cappella group is Yale's Society of Orpheus and Bacchus, or "SOB's". The first a cappella groups at other American Ivy League universities include Notes and Keys of Columbia, which were founded in 1909, the same year as the Whiffenpoofs; the Princeton Nassoons (c.1941); the Dartmouth Aires (1946); the Harvard Krokodiloes (1946); Cayuga's Waiters of Cornell University (1949); and the Jabberwocks of Brown University (1949). The Smith College Smiffenpoofs are the oldest continuous soprano/alto a cappella group, founded in 1936.

Similarly, the Varsity Vocals compose an international a cappella organization based around their two main competitions, the ICCA (International Competition of Collegiate A Cappella) and the ICHSA (International Competition of High School A Cappella). The South Asian a cappella competitive circuit is governed by the Association of South-Asian A Cappella (ASA), a non-profit organization formed in 2016, with some collegiate teams that compete in both circuits.

Collegiate a cappella is by far most common in the United States, from which it originated; however in recent decades the trend has spread to universities in the United Kingdom, the Republic of Ireland, Canada, Australia, and New Zealand, as well as a few nations in Asia.

=== Modern growth ===
In recent years, online a cappella communities have come together, allowing for greater involvement in the shaping of modern a cappella music, including stylistic trends. Among the most prominent online a cappella presences are the A Cappella Blog, Varsity Vocals, and CASA (The Contemporary A Cappella Society). According to the A Cappella Blog, it "was founded in January 2007. Since that time, the site has reviewed over 40 International Championship of Collegiate A Cappella competitions."

College a cappella has grown rapidly since 1980. This growth was fueled in part by stylistic changes that had widespread appeal, and in part by the founding in 1991 of the Contemporary A Cappella Society (CASA) by Deke Sharon and Rex Solomon, which enabled interaction and collaboration of a cappella groups across the United States for the first time. This growth was also fueled by student-led clubs on campuses that are not affiliated with their school music departments, growing from 225 ensembles in 1990 to nearly 1,000 in 2008.

Sharon, a member of the Tufts a cappella group The Beelzebubs, co-founded CASA after two years as the Beelzebubs' musical director. Sharon sought to bring a cappella into the musical mainstream, popularizing a more pop-based format for the music, as well as contributing to a standardization of a cappella performance through the founding of CASA.

One of CASA's core values in its promotion of the a cappella community is that of innovation, stating, "We develop new methods for singers, groups, fans, and educators to sing, learn, connect, and interact with one another." The new style used voices to emulate modern rock instruments, marking a shift away from the more traditional sounds of jazz or classical ensembles and glee clubs to contemporary a cappella, with groups focusing on modern pop music, complete with complex textures and a driving beat (see vocal percussion). While modern groups are still influenced by glee clubs, doo-wop groups, and barbershop quartets, they primarily focus on contemporary pop music, aiming to emulate a song's original sound while also offering their own interpretive elements.

== Performance ==
Collegiate a cappella spans many music genres and styles including jazz, pop, jazz-influenced pop, fusion, barbershop, rhythm and blues, madrigals, alternative and hard rock, comedy, Jewish (including Yiddish or Hebrew songs), Christian (including Christian pop and rearranged hymns), and South Asian fusion. Differences in musical styles and individual group preferences result in a great diversity of music arrangements and performances.

=== Arrangements ===
For many A Cappella groups, arrangements are the starting point for making music. These are musical pieces that contain musical notation for each voice part within the group. Arrangements usually indicate specifics in pitches, rhythms and tempo. There are several techniques that make each group distinctive: chiefly beatboxing, along with tone, sound effects, style, blend, and harmonies. Arrangements contain lyrical instructions, with most A Cappella groups relying on "syllable" sounds such as; "ooh", "ohh", "doo", and "bum".

=== Choreography and Formation ===
Within the ICCA and ICHSA is a point system. Each group is judged based on several things, some of which including sound, blend, harmonies, choreography, and many more. Choreography is a big factor in determining how many points a group will get, and how clean and precise their movements are is also vital. Meanwhile, non-competitive groups often have singers bounce or snap to the beat rather than relying on formal choreography. Singers often move along to the dynamics of the song, physically lowering themselves when quiet and standing taller during louder sections.

In the absence of choreography, many non-competitive groups tend to stand in specific formations to help the singers stay visible to the audience while also still being able to hear each other. Common formations include a two to three row arc formation resembling a curved bow, straight rows, or modified arcs that more closely resemble a U shape in which members stand closer together. Music directors are often in the middle or on either end to remain visible when providing cues; there have been debates as to whether or not conducting by music directors is necessary or appropriate for a cappella groups which are stylistically different from formal choral settings. Vocal percussionists and bass singers often have a designated spot near the center with access to microphones to amplify their parts.

=== Costume ===
The costumes and uniforms that the groups display present a message to the audience. They may vary in levels of uniformity and formality. Each group has a "brand" and a "look/style" to their members. Costumes can be whatever a group wants them to be, but aesthetic appearances is an important aspect of performance.

=== Arch sing ===
An "arch sing" is a casual, public performance, often held in an archway for reasons of acoustics and shelter from the weather. Typically, one or more a cappella groups will perform for a small audience, either as a concert or to promote other upcoming concerts. The term is also sometimes used to describe similar casual, outdoor performances not held under arches.

=== Live techniques ===
In recent years, with the advent of more advanced audio equipment and the ability of a cappella groups to attract income with live performances for pay, there has been increased exploration into the importance of microphones. Whereas groups at schools with older campuses find themselves with arches and naturally acoustically accentuated spaces in which to perform, many other groups find themselves lacking spaces such as these. Individual microphone use for each member of an ensemble has risen in popularity, allowing for, as Mike Chin of the A Cappella Blog states, a "big,...clear,...crisp" sound in an otherwise acoustically dull performance space. In addition, the use of individual microphones allows for added effects to be applied to a group's live vocals, such as adding a digital lower octave (or "octavizing") the bass vocalist to produce a tone that is outside the natural range of most singers. These technological advancements continue to shape the sound of modern a cappella music at the college level and beyond.

== Culture ==
Most collegiate a cappella groups, whether all-male identifying, all-female identifying, or mixed, share similar traits. The groups often benefit from the talent of non-music majors who have significant experience with music, choral singing, or both. Participation in such groups provides both a social and creative outlet for students who are pursuing other academic fields. A Cappella ensembles tend to employ a democratic structure of organization, oftentimes allowing members to exercise social and musical agency in informal settings. This enables members of A Cappella groups to participate in nonformal learning models, separate from informal streams. These are types of learning opportunities that are sought after and intentional in nature but not necessarily structured around institutional objectives or curriculum. Thus, it allows for learning environments that are organic yet guided.

Groups are generally self-sustaining and often entirely run by students. Some groups receive financial support from their educational institution while others are entirely self-supporting.

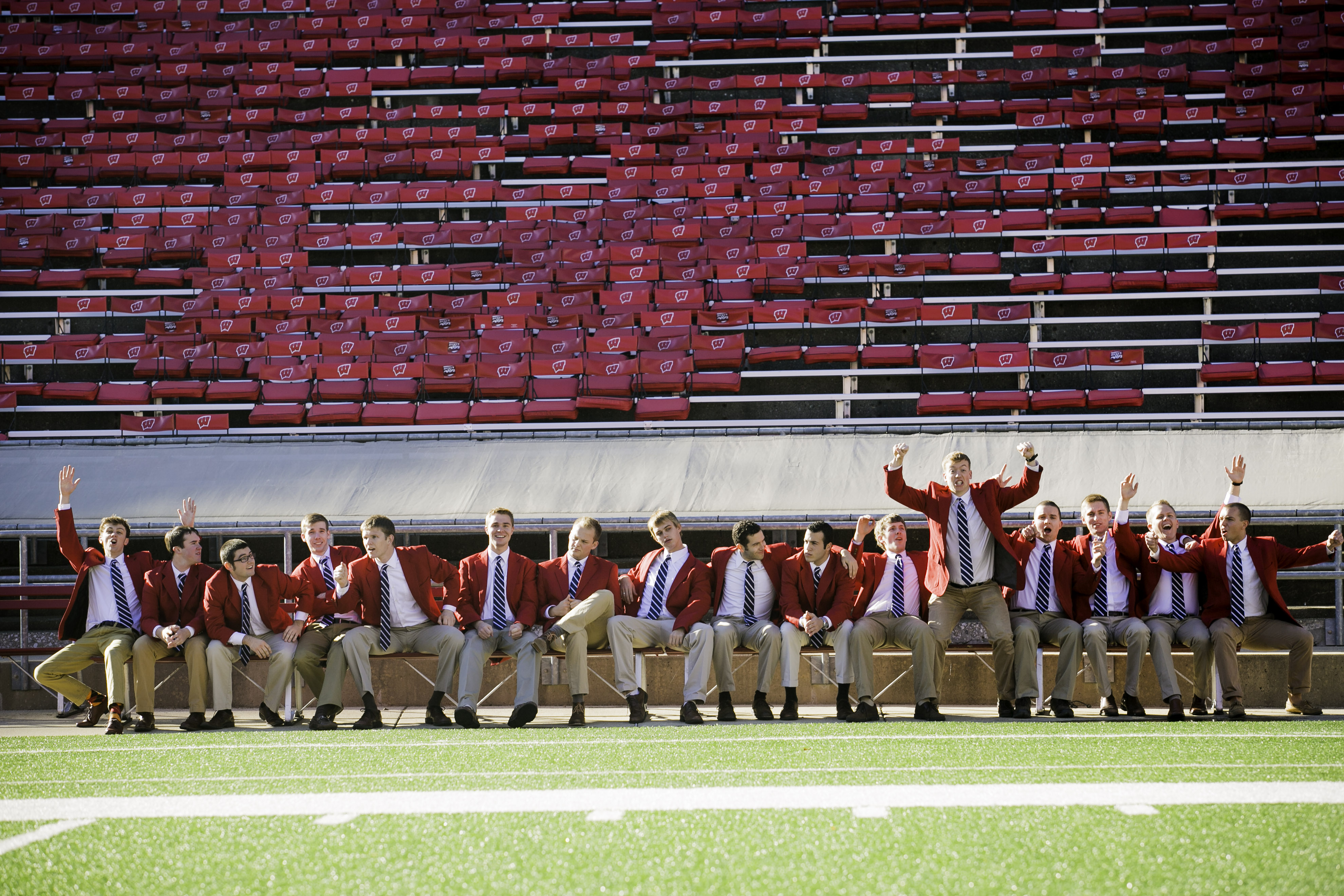
The MadHatters, from the University of Wisconsin-Madison, have a 16-member group.

Unlike professional groups, which typically have four to seven members, collegiate groups typically perform with eight to sixteen members, with full group rosters measuring up to 30 members in some cases. This large roster size is often driven by necessity, as college groups tend to see high turnover due to graduation and changing student commitments.

Many college groups compete in annual competitions organized by the International Championship of Collegiate A Cappella (ICCA), which conducts various regional competitions, with winners of regional competitions advancing to a national competition. The South-Asian a cappella circuit, run by ASA, also conducts various regional competitions leading up to All-American Awaaz, their national championship.

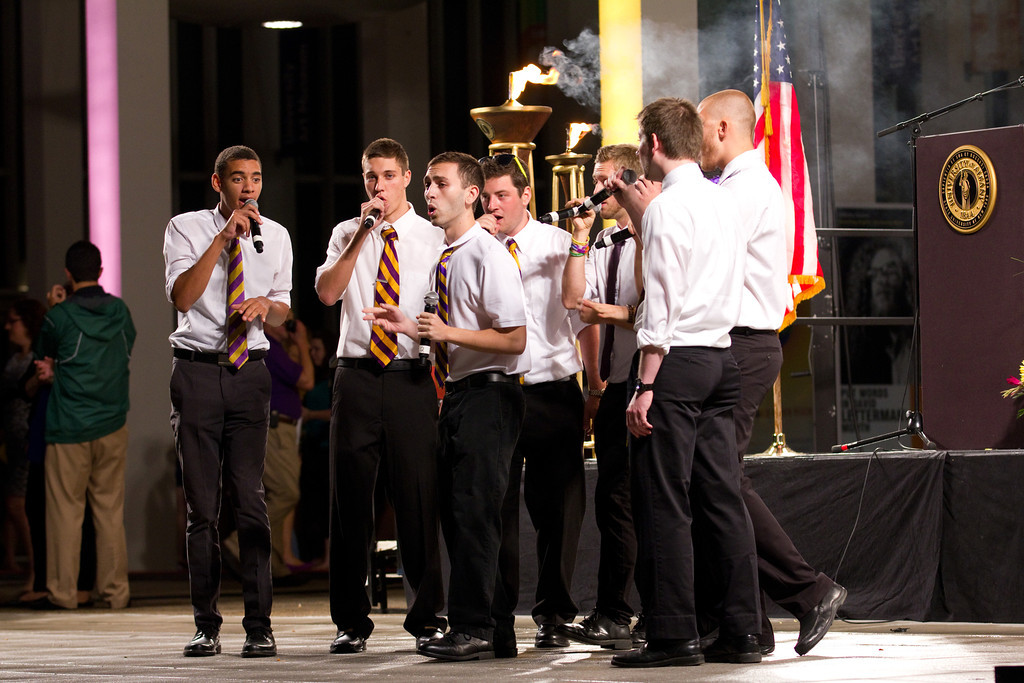
The University at Albany EarthTones

== See also ==
- List of collegiate a cappella groups
- List of university a cappella groups in the UK
- List of alumni of collegiate a cappella groups
- Pitch Perfect, an American comedy film which revolves around collegiate a cappella groups
