= Masi Oka =

Japanese actor (born 1974)

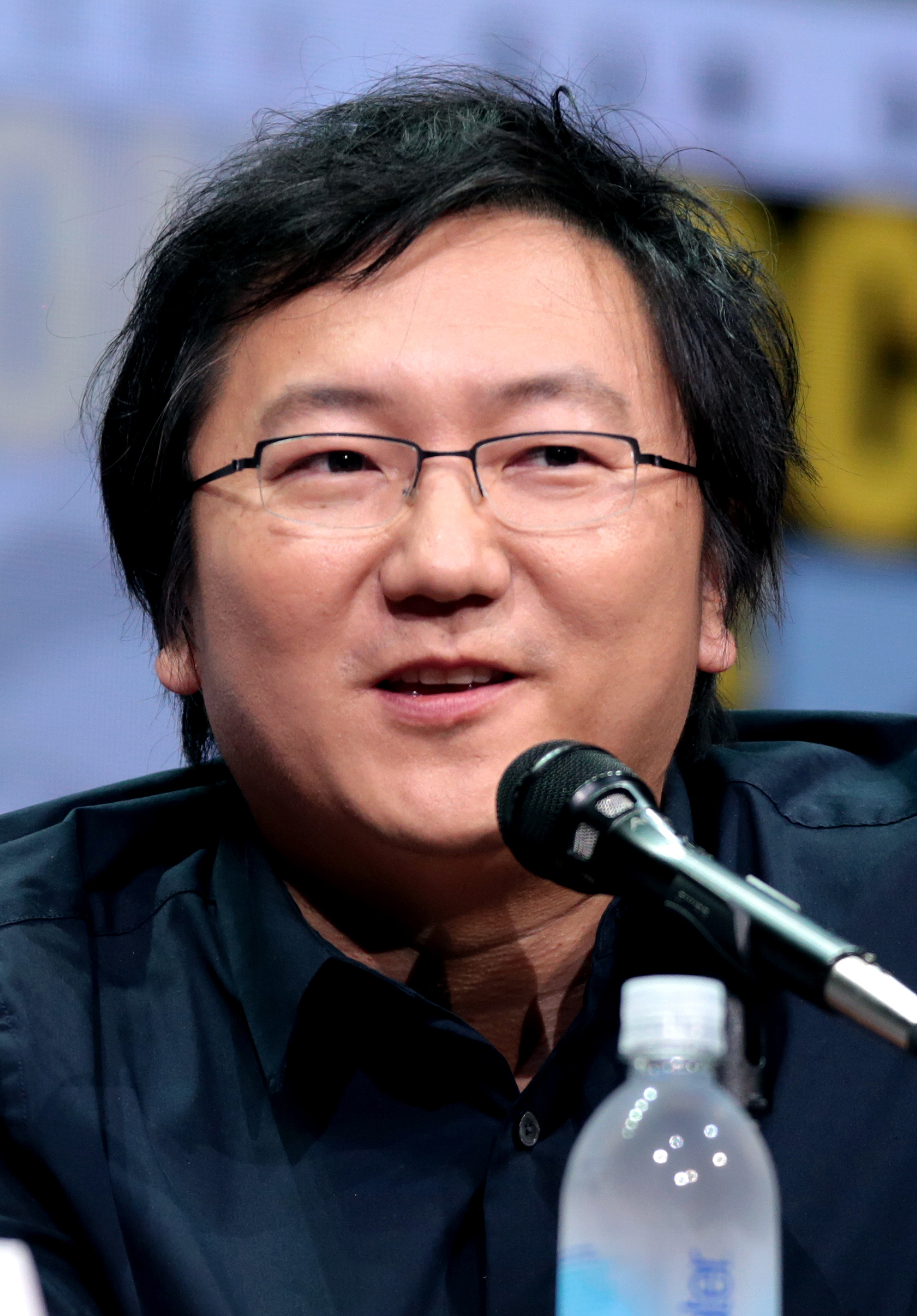
- Oka at the 2017 San Diego Comic-Con
- Born: December 27, 1974 (age 51); Shibuya, Tokyo, Japan
- Education: Brown University (BS)
- Occupations: Actor; producer; digital effects artist
- Years active: 1998–present

Japanese name
- Kanji: 岡 政偉
- Kana: おか まさより
Transcriptions
- Romanization: Oka Masayori

Masayori "Masi" Oka (岡 政偉, Oka Masayori; born December 27, 1974) is a Japanese actor, producer, and digital effects artist based in the United States who became widely known for starring in NBC's Heroes as Hiro Nakamura, for which he was nominated for the Primetime Emmy Award for Outstanding Supporting Actor in a Drama Series, and in CBS's Hawaii Five-0 as Doctor Max Bergman.

== Early life ==
Oka was born in Tokyo, Japan, to Setsuko Oka. His parents divorced when he was one month old; he was raised in a single parent family and has never met his father. He was six years old when he and his mother moved to Los Angeles from Japan. At age eight, he appeared on the CBS-TV game show Child's Play. In 1987, a 12-year-old Oka was featured as one of several children on the cover of Time magazine, for the article "Those Asian-American Whiz Kids." Though he was not featured in the article itself, he was acquainted with the photographer who conducted the shoot. In 1988, he placed fourth in the California state MATHCOUNTS competition and was one of the four students to represent the state of California in the national competition.

Oka attended Brown University, where he was musical director of The Bear Necessities all-male a cappella group. He graduated in 1997 with a BS in computer science and mathematics and a minor in theater arts.

Oka landed his first job after graduation at Industrial Light & Magic, George Lucas's motion picture visual special effects company, with the hope of one day earning an Oscar for technical work on a motion picture. He was also featured in the San Francisco Chronicle with ILM co-worker Anthony Shafer in a pre-dot-com article where he echoed his desire to meld acting and technology. He worked on the Star Wars prequel trilogy.

== Career ==
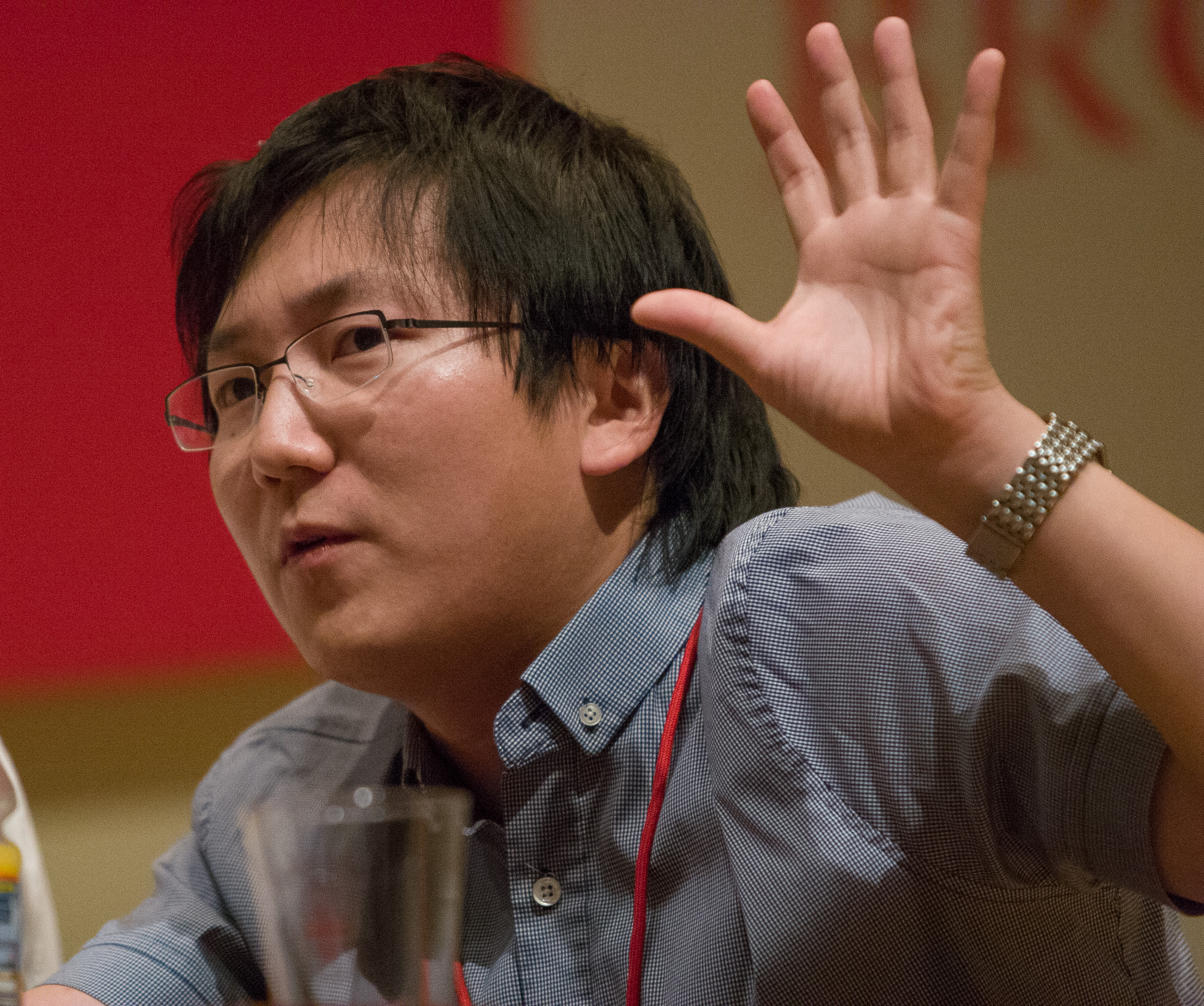
Oka in 2007

=== 2000–2005: Move to Los Angeles and working actor ===
Oka first tried acting in 2000. He earned a Screen Actors Guild card by appearing in industry films, then moved to Los Angeles. ILM stipulated in his contract that he could work at its Los Angeles branch but would have to return to their Marin County, California, location if he did not get cast for a recurring role that season. Oka was cast in a television pilot, and although the show was not picked up, it satisfied the contract's requirements, and he was allowed to work in Los Angeles.

During this period, Oka landed several minor roles in film and television, such as Austin Powers in Goldmember (2002) and the "Dances with Couch" episode of the sitcom Yes, Dear. He eventually landed a recurring role as Franklyn on the NBC comedy Scrubs.

He was featured in a North American commercial for Sega's 2002 PlayStation 2 video game, Shinobi, with the catchphrase 'Shinobi's back!' in front of Sega's 1987 Shinobi arcade cabinet.

=== 2006–2010: Heroes and mainstream recognition ===
In 2006, Oka was cast as the time-manipulating Hiro Nakamura in the NBC television series Heroes. Oka translated his own dialogue for the show, from English to Japanese; English subtitles accompanied his Japanese dialogue on the show. Prior to this, he was expecting to forgo acting by the end of that year's pilot season in lieu of pursuing writing and producing. Heroes was a breakout hit, and his portrayal of Nakamura earned him nominations for both a Golden Globe Award for Best Supporting Actor – Series, Miniseries or Television Film and a Primetime Emmy Award for Outstanding Supporting Actor in a Drama Series, the only actor on the show to be nominated on either award shows. He was named the Coolest Geek at the Spike TV Guys' Choice Awards on June 13, 2007. In 2007, he presented an award with Heroes co-star Hayden Panettiere on the 20th annual Nickelodeon Kids' Choice Awards.

In addition to his work on the show, he continued to work at ILM up to three days a week as a research and development technical director, writing programs that create special effects.

He played the role of Bruce in the big screen version of Get Smart. He played a real estate broker who is trying to sell to Seann William Scott's character in Steve Conrad's The Promotion.

=== 2010–present: Hawaii Five-0 and other projects ===
Oka played the coroner Dr. Max Bergman in CBS' Hawaii Five-0, a remake of the original series which aired from 1968 to 1980. He joined the show's main cast in the second series. His character was written as an ethnic Japanese who was adopted at birth by Jewish parents, hence his last name. Oka also made an appearance in the film Friends with Benefits.

In 2015, Oka reprised his role as Hiro Nakamura in NBC's miniseries Heroes Reborn.

Oka has turned his digital effects skills to video game production, founding the video game development studio Mobius Digital, where he was a producer on the critically acclaimed Outer Wilds.

He played the character Ringo in the 2023 animated Netflix series Blue Eye Samurai.

== Personal life ==
Oka is fluent in Japanese, English and Spanish. He worked on the 1992 Summer Olympics as an English, Spanish, and Japanese translator. He played chess in his youth and had a peak USCF Elo rating of 2080.

Similar to his character Hiro Nakamura, Oka also collects manga. He co-produced the 2017 American adaptation of the manga series Death Note. He also founded the video game studio Mobius Digital Games, mainly known for its game Outer Wilds.

He has earned the rank of black belt in kendō (Japanese fencing).

== Filmography ==
=== Audiobooks, Audio Entertainment, and Podcasts ===
| Year | Title | Role |
|---|---|---|
| 2013 | World War Z | Kondo Tatsumi |

=== Film ===
| Year | Title | Role | Notes |
|---|---|---|---|
| 2002 | Austin Powers in Goldmember | Japanese Pedestrian | |
| 2003 | Uh-Oh! | Asian Man | |
| 2003 | Legally Blonde 2: Red, White & Blonde | Congressional Intern | Uncredited |
| 2004 | Along Came Polly | Wonsuk | |
| 2005 | The Proud Family Movie | Japanese Kid/Announcer | Voice only |
| 2005 | Noroi: The Curse | Self | |
| 2005 | House of the Dead 2 | Stanley Tong | |
| 2006 | One Sung Hero | KJ | Short film |
| 2007 | Balls of Fury | Feng's men's room attendant | |
| 2008 | Get Smart | Bruce | |
| 2008 | Get Smart's Bruce and Lloyd: Out of Control | Bruce | Direct-to-video |
| 2008 | The Promotion | Loan Officer | |
| 2009 | Fired Up | Eagle Mascot | |
| 2010 | Searching for Sonny | Sonny Bosco | |
| 2011 | Friends with Benefits | Darin Arturo Morena | |
| 2013 | Jobs | Ken Tanaka | |
| 2017 | Death Note | Detective Sasaki | Also producer |
| 2018 | The Meg | Toshi | |
| 2019 | Spies in Disguise | Katsu Kimura | Voice role |
| 2022 | Bullet Train | Conductor | |

=== Television ===
| Year | Title | Role | Notes |
|---|---|---|---|
| 2001 | Dharma & Greg | Nien-Jin | Episode: "The End of the Innocence: Part 2" |
| 2001 | Citizen Baines | Staffer Dan | Episode: "The Whole Thump-Thump-Thump" |
| 2001 | Gilmore Girls | Philosophy Student | Episode: "The Road Trip to Harvard" |
| 2002 | Yes, Dear | Talking Rock | Episode: "Dances with Couch" |
| 2002 | Sabrina, the Teenage Witch | Male Council Member | Episode: "The Whole Ball of Wax" |
| 2002 | She Spies | Guy | Episode: "Fondles" |
| 2002–2003 | The Jamie Kennedy Experiment | Various | 4 episodes |
| 2002–2004 | Scrubs | Franklyn | 5 episodes |
| 2003 | On the Spot | Japanese Tourist | Episode: "Little Brenda Dynamite" |
| 2003 | Luis | Deng Wu | 9 episodes |
| 2004 | Still Standing | Ronald | Episode: "Still Bill's Dad" |
| 2004 | All of Us | Edwin | Episode: "Home for Christmas?" |
| 2005 | Less Than Perfect | Hideki | Episode: "I Just Don't Like Here" |
| 2005 | Reno 911! | Translator | |
| 2005 | Joey | Arthur | |
| 2005 | God Wears My Underwear | Brother Eo | Voice only |
| 2005 | Punk'd | Translator | Season 5 |
| 2006 | Reba | IRS Agent Phung | Episode: "Don't Mess with Taxes" |
| 2006 | Without a Trace | Wei Fan | Episode: "Check Your Head" |
| 2006 | The Loop | Wang | Episode: "The Year of the Dog" |
| 2006 | The Sarah Silverman Program | Clerk | Episode: "Batteries" |
| 2006–2010 | Heroes | Hiro Nakamura | 66 episodes |
| 2007 | Jane Doe: Ties That Bind | Agent Osaka | Television film |
| 2007 | Studio 60 on the Sunset Strip | Himself | Episode: "The Harriet Dinner"; uncredited |
| 2007 | Robot Chicken | Japanese Mr. Rogers / Chachi | Voice only |
| 2007–2008 | Reno 911! | Foreign Tourist, Japanese Translator | 3 episodes |
| 2008 | Discovery Atlas | Narrator | Episode: "Japan Revealed" |
| 2010–2017; 2019 | Hawaii Five-0 | Doctor Max Bergman | Recurring (Season 1); Main (Seasons 2–7); 97 episodes; Guest (Season 10) |
| 2015 | Heroes Reborn | Hiro Nakamura | 3 episodes |
| 2018 | Mozart in the Jungle | Fukumoto | 4 episodes |
| 2021 | Star Wars: Visions | Ethan (voice) | Short film: "The Ninth Jedi": English language dub |
| 2023 | Blue Eye Samurai | Ringo /Muñones | Voice only |
| 2025 | Light & Magic | Himself | 2 episodes |
| 2026 | Star Wars: Visions Presents – The Ninth Jedi | Ethan (voice) | English language dub |

=== Video games ===
| Year | Title | Role | Notes |
|---|---|---|---|
| 2007 | Cars Mater-National Championship | Koji | Voice role |
| 2007 | Driver '76 | Jimmy Yip | Voice role |
| 2019 | Outer Wilds | | Producer |

== Production work ==
=== Digital effects artist ===
| Year | Title | Notes |
|---|---|---|
| 1998 | Mighty Joe Young | CG technical assistant: Industrial Light & Magic (ILM) |
| 1999 | Star Wars: Episode I – The Phantom Menace | Visual effects production and technical support: ILM |
| 2000 | Mission to Mars | Technical support: ILM |
| 2000 | The Perfect Storm | Digital artist: ILM |
| 2002 | Star Wars: Episode II – Attack of the Clones | Digital effects artist: ILM |
| 2003 | Hulk | Technical director: ILM |
| 2003 | Terminator 3: Rise of the Machines | CG artist: ILM |
| 2005 | Star Wars: Episode III – Revenge of the Sith | Digital artist: ILM |
| 2005 | War of the Worlds | Digital artist: ILM |
| 2006 | Pirates of the Caribbean: Dead Man's Chest | Digital artist: ILM |

== Awards and nominations ==
| Year | Award | Work | Category | Result | Ref. |
|---|---|---|---|---|---|
| 2006 | Golden Globes | Heroes | Best Performance by an Actor in a Supporting Role in a Series, Miniseries or Motion Picture Made for Television | Nominated | |
| 2007 | Gold Derby TV Award | Heroes | Breakthrough Performer of the Year | Nominated | |
| 2007 | Gold Derby TV Award | Heroes | Drama Supporting Actor | Nominated | |
| 2007 | OFTA Television Award | Heroes | Best Supporting Actor in a Drama Series | Nominated | |
| 2007 | Primetime Emmy | Heroes | Outstanding Supporting Actor in a Drama Series | Nominated | |
| 2007 | Satellite Awards | Heroes | Best Actor in a Supporting Role in a Series, Mini-Series or Motion Picture Made for Television | Nominated | |
| 2007 | Saturn Award | Heroes | Best Supporting Actor on Television | Won | |
| 2007 | Scream Award | Heroes | Best Superhero | Nominated | |
| 2007 | Teen Choice Award | Heroes | Choice TV: Breakout | Nominated | |
