= Dhamakapella =

Asian a cappella group

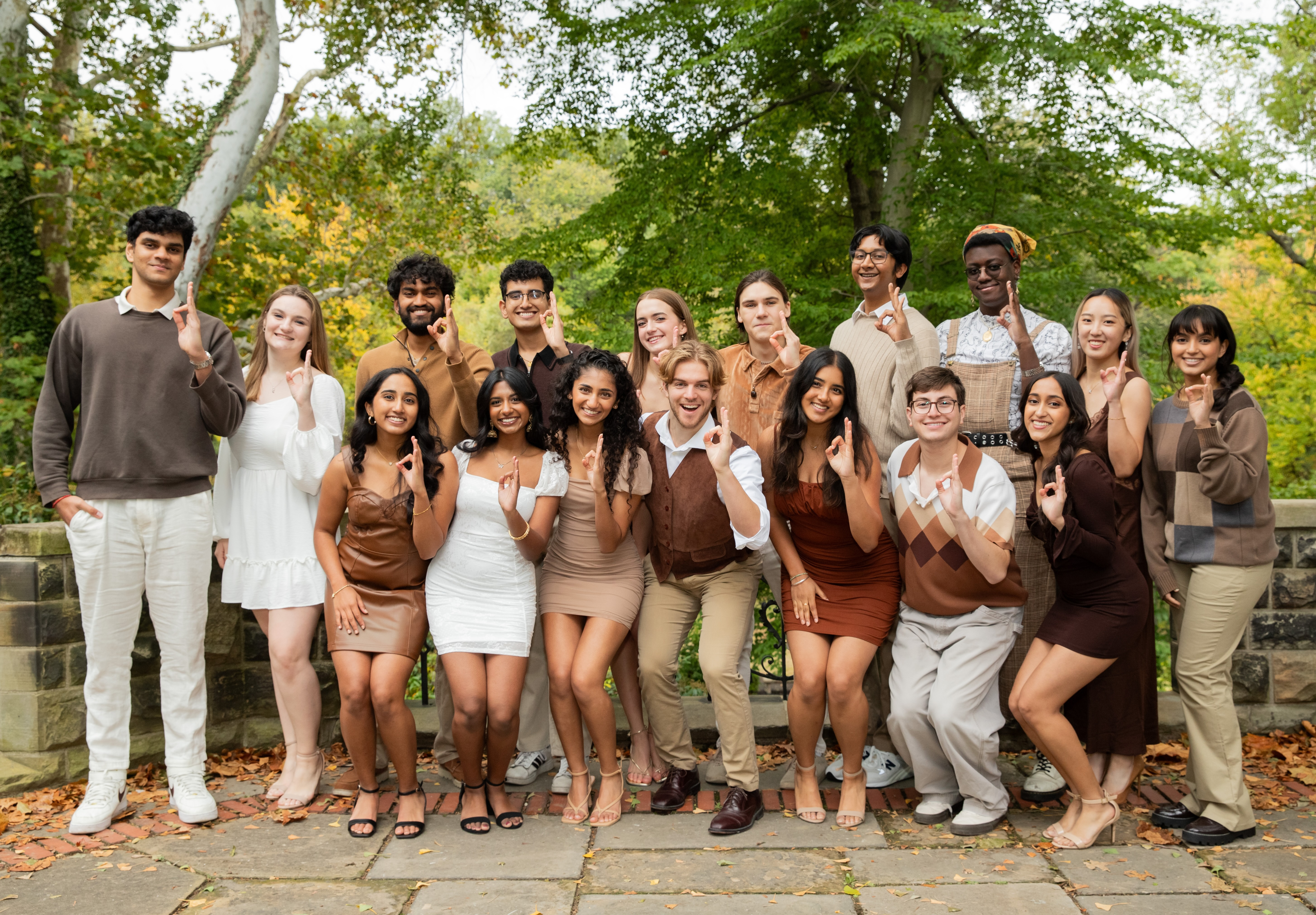
- Dhamakapella in 2024

Background information
- Origin: Case Western Reserve University, Cleveland, Ohio, U.S.
- Genre: A cappella
- Years active: 2005–present
- Website: dhamakapella.co

Dhamakapella (abbreviated Dhamaka) is a coed South Asian fusion a cappella group based at Case Western Reserve University, in Cleveland, Ohio. Formed in the spring of 2005 by students Mayank Prasad, Raksha Soora, and Manoj Nair, Dhamakapella's music is influenced by both South Asian and Western genres, and mixes contemporary Western songs with popular South Asian music. Since Dhamaka's inception in 2005, the group has recorded and produced albums, EPs, and singles composed of both professional and original arrangements written by current members of the group or alumni. As CWRU's largest competitive a cappella group, the group competes nationally and has won thirty-one national titles.

== Career ==
Dhamakapella was formed in 2005 by student Mayank Prasad at Case Western Reserve University. With help from students Raksha Soora and Manoj Nair, Mayank organized and established the first university-recognized coed a cappella group, which would feature music from both Western and South Asian cultures. Within three years, Dhamakapella grew into a sixteen-member group, with singers of various and diverse styles. Due to the nontraditional arrangements and unique compositions, the group instantly stood out both on campus and in downtown Cleveland.

Dhamakapella began nationally competing in the fall of 2011, becoming Case Western Reserve University's sole competitive a cappella group on campus. By 2016, they had already won six national titles at various competitions across the country. In 2017, after winning another 3 national titles, Dhamakapella was one of seven teams to qualify for the first-ever South Asian fusion a cappella bid-style championship, All-American Awaaz (A3), where they placed 3rd and won "Best Arrangement" for their arrangement of "Man Mandira". In 2018, Dhamakapella qualified again for A3 after holding the top spot in the bid point rankings for the entire season. They placed 2nd and received two individual awards. In 2019, in addition to qualifying yet again for A3, Dhamakapella entered the International Competition of Collegiate A Cappella (ICCA) circuit in their local Midwest region for the first time. They were accepted into Quarterfinals where they placed 2nd and qualified for the Midwest Semifinal in St Louis, Missouri.

In 2011, Dhamakapella released its debut album Pehli Nazar: First Look, and in 2015 released its sophomore album Naya Zamana / Welcome to the New Age, following the group's growing popularity across the city and the University. In late 2014, the group released their first music video ever, for their arrangement "Radioactive / Jiya Jale / Ae Ajinabi" from Naya Zamana. In December 2016, Dhamakapella released a single, "Don't You Worry Child / Dastaan-E-Om Shanti Om" and later released their second music video for the same song. On August 23, 2017, Dhamakapella released their first EP, Riyaaz. As revealed on their Facebook page, Riyaaz consists of all three songs from their 2016-2017 award-winning competition set. On November 17, 2018, Dhamakapella released their second competition set EP entitled Afsana: Our Story. It consists of the four songs from their 2017-2018 competition set.

== Competitions and awards ==
Dhamakapella performs across the United States and at various universities, spanning cities from Boston to Los Angeles. Since beginning to compete in 2011, Dhamakapella has placed at twenty-two national a cappella competitions both in the ICCA circuit and the ASA circuit, winning additional accolades along the way:

Year	Competition	Location	Placing	Awards
2011	Anahat	University of California, Berkeley	2nd	N/A
2013	Phillyfest Phillharmonic	Philadelphia, PA	2nd	N/A
2013	Gathe Raho	University of Iowa	1st	Best Choreography; Best Female Soloist (Neha Dwivedi); Best Beatboxer (Rahul Chander)
2015	Sangeet Saagar	North Carolina State University	2nd	None
2015	Gathe Raho	University of Iowa	1st	Best Female Soloist (Neha Dwivedi, Krithika Rajkumar)
2016	Sangeet Saagar	North Carolina State University	1st	None
2017	Sangeet Saagar	North Carolina State University	2nd	None
2017	Yaadein	Boston University	1st	Best Soloist (Madhav Nandan, Naveen Ram); Best Arrangement ("Man Mandira" arr. by Shaunak Roy)
2017	Gathe Raho	University of Iowa	2nd	Best Male Soloist (Vasu Kuram, Naveen Ram, Shaunak Roy); Best Arrangement ("Writing's On The Wall / Duaa" arr. by Shaunak Roy)
2017	All-American Awaaz	New York City, NY	3rd	"Crowd Favorite" Award; Best Arrangement ("Man Mandira" arr. by Shaunak Roy)
2017	Jeena	University of Texas at Austin	1st	Best Arrangement (Shaunak Roy); Best Male Soloist (Madhav Nandan)
2018	Yaadein	Boston University	1st	Best Arrangement (Entire Set arr. by Ronnell Canada and Shaunak Roy); Best Vocal Percussionist (Shaunak Roy)
2018	All-American Awaaz	Chicago, IL	2nd	Outstanding Male Soloist (Vasu Kuram); Outstanding Visual Performance
2019	Sahana	University of California, Los Angeles	None	Outstanding Arrangement ("Fool For You / Soch Na Sake / Judaai" arr. by Shaunak Roy)
2019	ICCA Midwest Quarterfinal #4	Granville High School, OH	2nd	Outstanding Vocal Percussion (Lewis Orr)
2019	Gathe Raho	University of Iowa	3rd	None
2019	All-American Awaaz	Washington, D.C.	None	Outstanding South Asian Soloist (Divyam Agrawal)
2020	ICCA Midwest Quarterfinal #1	Case Western Reserve University	3rd	None
2022	Steel City Sapna	University of Pittsburgh	1st	Best Vocal Percussion (Vivek Kapur); Best Arrangement ("Bhare Naina / Light 'em Up" arr. by Anusha Mudigonda)
2022	ICCA Midwest Quarterfinal #1	Case Western Reserve University	1st	Outstanding Arrangement ("Bhare Naina / Light 'em Up" arr. by Anusha Mudigonda); Outstanding Choreography (Kasey Pukys and Jennifer Huang)
2022	ICCA Midwest Semifinal	Washington University in St. Louis	2nd	Outstanding Vocal Percussion (Vivek Kapur)
2022	Gathe Raho	University of Iowa, Virtual	2nd	Outstanding Non-South Asian Soloist (Anusha Mudigonda); Best Visual Performance (Kasey Pukys and Jennifer Huang)
2022	All-American Awaaz	San Antonio, TX	1st	None
2023	Steel City Sapna	University of Pittsburgh	1st	Outstanding Arrangement ("Ae Dil Hai Mushkil / All For Us" arr. by Juniper Duncan)
2023	Gathe Raho	University of Iowa	1st	Outstanding Vocal Percussion (Sashvat Iyer); Outstanding Visual Performance (Jennifer Huang); Outstanding Arrangement ("Ae Dil Hai Mushkil / All For Us" arr. by Juniper Duncan); Outstanding Solo in a Non-South Asian Song (Harshini Somisetty for "Youth")
2023	ICCA Midwest Quarterfinal #4	Case Western Reserve University	2nd	Outstanding Vocal Percussion (Sashvat Iyer)
2023	All-American Awaaz	Atlanta, GA	1st	Outstanding Soloist in a South Asian Song (Anusha Mudigonda for "Jiya Re"); Outstanding Arrangement ("Ae Dil Hai Mushkil / All For Us" arr. by Juniper Duncan)
2024	Spartan Sitara	Michigan State University	1st	Outstanding Soloist in a Non-South Asian Song (Harshini Somisetty for "Past Lives x Mitwa"); Outstanding Arrangement ("Past Lives x Mitwa" arr. by Juniper Duncan); Outstanding Vocal Percussion (Sashvat Iyer); Outstanding Visual Performance (Jennifer Huang, Rachel Gopalani, and Harry Ganz)
2024	Davis Dhwani	University of California, Davis	1st	Outstanding Arrangement ("Like I Would x Tere Ho Ke Rahenge" arr. by Juniper Duncan); Outstanding Visual Performance (Jennifer Huang, Rachel Gopalani, and Harry Ganz)
2024	ICCA Midwest Quarterfinal #5	Case Western Reserve University	1st	Outstanding Vocal Percussion (Sashvat Iyer); Outstanding Arrangement (Juniper Duncan)
2024	ICCA Midwest Semifinal	William Henry Harrison High School, OH	3rd	Outstanding Vocal Percussion (Sashvat Iyer); Outstanding Choreography (Jennifer Huang, Rachel Gopalani, and Harry Ganz)
2024	All-American Awaaz	Chicago, IL	1st	None

Other competitions that Dhamakapella has partaken in include SingStrong A Cappella Festival 2012, and Wooster VoiceFest 2013.

== Artistry ==
All of Dhamakapella's arrangements, performed and recorded, have been written by members or alumni of the group. The arrangements aim to be cohesive and create a new story arc based upon the songs that are fused together. As a South Asian fusion group, the group derives its influences from Indian classical, contemporary Bollywood, pop, dubstep, and electronic genres.

== Discography ==
- Pehli Nazar: First Look (2011)
- Naya Zamana / Welcome to the New Age (2015)
- Riyaaz (2017)
- Afsana: Our Story (2018)
- Fitoor (2020)
- Ishaara (2022)
- Dhamakapella: Anthology 2022 (2022)
- Azira (2023)

=== Reception ===
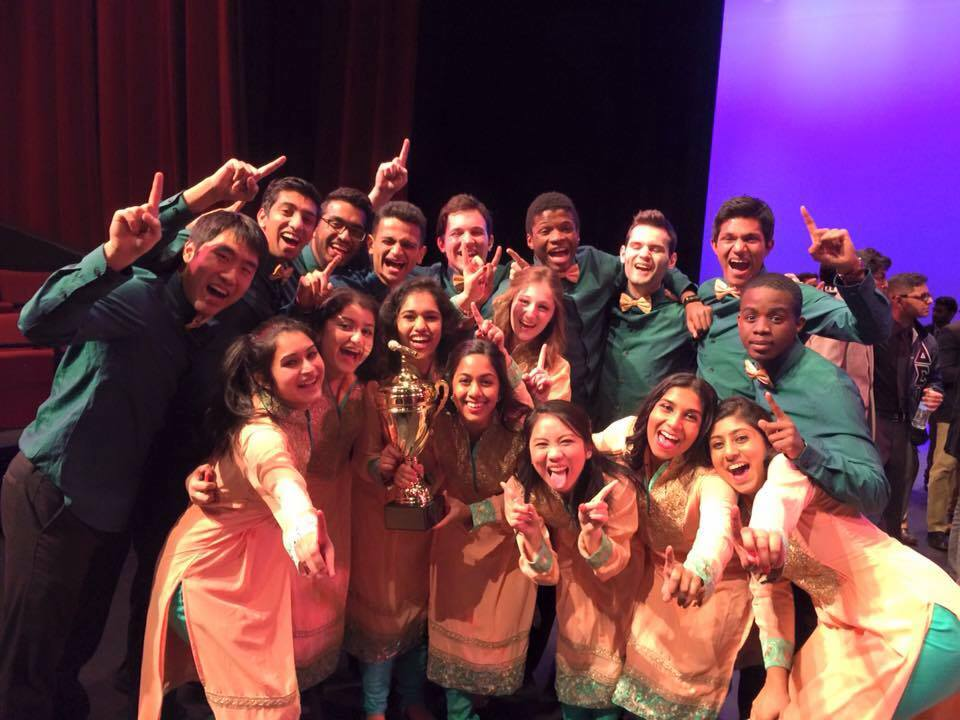
Dhamakapella after winning 1st Place at Sangeet Saagar 2016

Pehli Nazar: First Look was released on April 14, 2011 and received mixed to positive reviews from music critics. The Recorded A Cappella Review Board, which assigns a normalized rating out of 5, gave the album a 3, based on various reviews. Jonathan Minkoff quoted that “The unique vocal flips, melismas and haunting scale forms of Indian music are by far the most interesting elements of the group's debut” and “The merger of East and West is a compelling artistic concept and one that Dhamakapella is uniquely suited to present.” Writer Catherine Lewis praised the album's arrangements and complexity, stating “When Dhamakapella is on, the group absolutely hits it out of the park.”

Naya Zamana / Welcome to the New Age was released on February 28, 2015 and received mostly positive reviews. The Recorded A Cappella Review Board gave the album a 3.7, based on various reviews. Critic Dave Bernstein praised the album's sound and production, quoting that "Dhamakapella has taken bold steps forward in its own evolution with Naya Zamana / Welcome to the New Age". Writer Leigh Holmes Foster states that the album "Ushers in a new age for the group", and compliments the group's soloists and energy.

Riyaaz was released on August 23, 2017 and received mostly positive reviews. The Recorded A Cappella Review Board gave the EP a 3.7, based on various reviews. Kimberly Raschka Sailor complimented the EP's arrangements, stating, "Riyaaz is unique and engaging, offering stronger arrangements than RARB typically receives in the South Asian a cappella realm." Stephen Lanza critiqued the group's energy and intensity, writing, "I very much like many of the decisions that Shaunak Roy makes in the colors of the backgrounds, but finding ways to keep the energy and the emotion moving forward as the songs advance is still a bit of a lacking area in this album." Thomas Dec wrote, "Riyaaz is not a show stopper, but it is in line with the average RARB submission and worth a listen."
