= The Harvard-Radcliffe Veritones =

- Origin: Harvard University
- Genres: a cappella, contemporary
- Years active: 1985-present
- Website: harvardveritones.com

The Harvard-Radcliffe Veritones is an a cappella group at Harvard University founded in 1985 by a group of undergraduates. It is one of several contemporary co-ed a cappella groups at the college. Along with two performances every year in Sanders Theatre, they perform at a variety of events on campus and in the greater Boston–New York area. They also compete in the ICCA Northeast Quarterfinals and Semifinals. The Veritones won recognition in 2018 for producing the first virtual reality a cappella music video with a cover of Gemini Feed by Banks, including a perfect score from RARB and CASA A Cappella Video Award nominations for Best Mixed Collegiate Video and Best Electronic/Experimental Video, winning runner-up for Best Mixed Collegiate Video.

== Performances ==
The Veritones have performed for Laverne Cox, Jason Alexander, and Josh Groban in addition to singing with Bobby McFerrin on the Harvard campus. The group sang the NFL theme on national television for a 2016 Patriots vs Texans Thursday Night Football game. In 2019, they performed for the cast of Unbreakable Kimmy Schmidt in a celebratory ceremony on Harvard's campus for the show's cast and producers. The Veritones regularly perform with other national and international a cappella groups, such as the Nor'easters, Oxford University's Out of the Blue, and the UCLA Scattertones.

In 2013, they were featured on BuzzFeed's Top 15 Contemporary A Cappella Performances for their version of Taylor Swift's "I Knew You Were Trouble".

== Discography ==
=== Albums and EPs ===
- REVIVE (2019)
- Momentvm (2015)
- Silver Linings (2014)
- XXV (2010)
- VeriStance (2008)
- Imprudence (2002)
- Vertigo (1999)
- Decadence (1995)
- Take It From the Top

=== Singles ===
- Pretty Hurts (2014)
- Bad Blood (2017)
- Gemini Feed (2017)

=== Featured tracks ===
- "They," Best of College a Cappella (2009)
- "Crush," Voices Only 2008 (2008)
- "Circumcision Blues," Wasting Our Parents' Money: The Best of College a Cappella Humor (1999)
- "Have Yourself a Merry Little Christmas," An Ivy League Christmas (1994)
