= Lists of a cappella groups =

This is a list of lists of a cappella groups. There are several lists of a cappella groups, listings of groups that sing a cappella.

- List of alumni of collegiate a cappella groups
- List of collegiate a cappella groups in the United States
- List of professional a cappella groups
- List of Stanford University a cappella groups
- List of university a cappella groups in the United Kingdom
