= Smiffenpoofs =

The Smiffenpoofs
- Also known as: The Smiffenpoofs
- Origin: Smith College, Northampton, Massachusetts, United States
- Genres: Collegiate a cappella
- Years active: 1936–present
- Label: Collegiate
- Website: Official Site

Formed in 1936 at Smith College, the Smiffenpoofs are the oldest traditionally all-female collegiate a cappella group in the United States.

Following their March 2, 2006 performance in Brattleboro, Vermont, the Smiffenpoofs were praised in the Brattleboro Reformer: "The Smiffenpoofs are as tight and refined as a group can be. They are champagne and caviar, Newport Beach and Rolls-Royce." The Smiffenpoofs’ arrangement of Imogen Heap’s "Hide and Seek" has also been described as "absolutely stunning", and the performance as "a sanctuary of calm, moving ensemble singing…just beautiful."

The Smiffenpoofs have built up a discography of several CDs and records over the past thirty years. Their brother a cappella group is The Brown Derbies.

== Discography ==
- You've Gotta Have Everything... (1958)
- Once Was A Time (1974)
- Definitive Smiffenpoofs (1978)
- After The Gold Rush (1981)
- A Living Jukebox (1983)
- Dining At The Ritz (1987)
- In The Dark! (Live Album) 1988
- Smiffenpoofs...Enough Said (1989)
- Bang, Pow, Poof! (1993)
- Get Out Of The House (1995)
- The Smiffenpoofs Have Left The Building (1997)
- Twelve (1999)
- Testimony (2002)
- Bear Right At Tiny's (2006)
- Smiffenpoofs 75 (2011)
- Poofs in Boots (Live Album) (2012)
- Genesis of Rhythm: Smiffenpoofs 2013 (2013)
- XOXO, The Poofs (EP) (2015)
- Miss That Love of Mine (2021)
- Come Home to My Heart (Live EP) (2025)
- Did You Hear That? (2026)
