= Cayuga's Waiters =

Cornell University a cappella group

- Genre: A cappella
- Years active: 1949-2017

The Cayuga's Waiters were an all-male collegiate a cappella vocal ensemble at Cornell University from 1949–2017. Cornell University permanently dismissed the group in 2017 as the outcome of an investigation into hazing incidents.

== History ==
=== Glee Club Subset (1949–1956) ===
The Cayuga's Waiters formed in 1949. The name is a play on Cornell's alma mater, "Far Above Cayuga's Waters".^{:239} Although dressed in standard Glee Club attire (a tuxedo), they distinguished themselves from other Glee Club members by draping towels over their arms—a visual pun on their ensemble's name. Their repertoire included such popular songs as "Mood Indigo," "Mandy," "Ev'ry Time We Say Goodbye," and "Lord, If I Get My Ticket."^{:239} By 1951, the group had become much in-demand on campus for singing engagements, and they were also enthusiastically received by audiences when on tour with the Glee Club.^{:239}

The early 1950s were a busy and tumultuous period, as the young group had inadvertently stumbled onto an entirely new and growing collegiate phenomena, the small a capella singing group. As Michael Slon ('92) wrote in his book Songs From The Hill — A History Of The Cornell Glee Club:

Prior to the Waiters, the regimen of small group singing, traveling, and recording, completely familiar today, did not exist at Cornell. Not realizing they were pioneers, the new triple quartet set out by accepting local engagements on top of their Glee Club duties, and soon found their popularity and activity were snowballing.^{:240}

In 1953, the Waiters conducted their first independent tour — to Bermuda's Harbor Castle Hotel — over the winter holidays, and in the same year, they recorded and cut their first record. In 1956, the Waiters decided they could no longer split their efforts between choral and small group singing, and permanently dissociated from the Glee Club. Despite the shock of disassociation, both organizations went on to enjoy enormous success throughout the remainder of the 20th century.

=== Independent History (1956–2017) ===
==== Spring Fever Concert ====
In 1974, The Waiters performed their first annual "Spring Fever" concert. The Waiters performed this show annually until 2016. The show was mentioned on various blogs, including Slope Media, which described the show as "taking [...] A Cappella to another level." In the early 1990s, the Waiters added a December Holiday Show to their yearly concert repertoire. The Holiday Show was performed every December through the 2000s.

==== "We Didn't Go To Harvard" ====
In 1990, The Waiters wrote and performed "We Didn't Go To Harvard," a parody of Billy Joel's "We Didn't Start The Fire." The song has received over 152,000 views on YouTube, and has inspired other college singing groups to create their own parodies based on Billy Joel's 1989 #1 hit song.

==== Electronic Recordings Online ====
In 2000, shortly after its fiftieth anniversary, the ensemble uploaded much of its material to the Internet.

==== "Pitch Perfect" ====
The 2012 sleeper hit movie "Pitch Perfect" was based on Pitch Perfect: The Quest for Collegiate A Cappella Glory, a non-fiction book written by group alumnus Mickey Rapkin ('00) and published in 2009.

==== Suspension and Dismissal from Cornell ====
In 2016, the Waiters were temporarily suspended by Cornell's Office of the Judicial Administrator for possible violations of the Campus Code of Conduct. Cornell University announced on April 25, 2017 that the Waiters were permanently dismissed from campus for their history of hazing infractions.

== Albums ==
The Waiters recorded 26 albums:

As a Glee Club subset:

- Cayuga's Waiters 51–52 (1952)
- Cayuga's Waiters 53–54 (1954)
- Cayuga's Waiters 54–55 (1955)

As an independent organization:

- Cocktails For Twelve (1959)
- Goodnight Little Girl (1961)
- Presenting Cayuga's Waiters (1963)
- Just Waitin' (1964)
- Pow! (1966)
- Lost In The Sound (1968)
- Still Waitin' (1975)
- Waitin' For You (1976)
- Straight Break (1977)
- 12° North (1983)
- Laughed Out Of Town (1986)
- Maintaining The Illusion (1989)
- Live At Spring Fever XVI (1990)
- Niko's Cafe (1993)
- Live And Kicking (1996)
- Channel Zero (1998)
- Clothing Optional (1999)
- Straight Outta C-town (2001)
- Spring Fever 28 Ticket CD (2002)
- The Forgotten Room (2003)
- Wednesday Night (2007)
- Stripped (2010)
- Nothing Wrong (2015)
