= The Harvard Krokodiloes =

American university a cappella ensemble

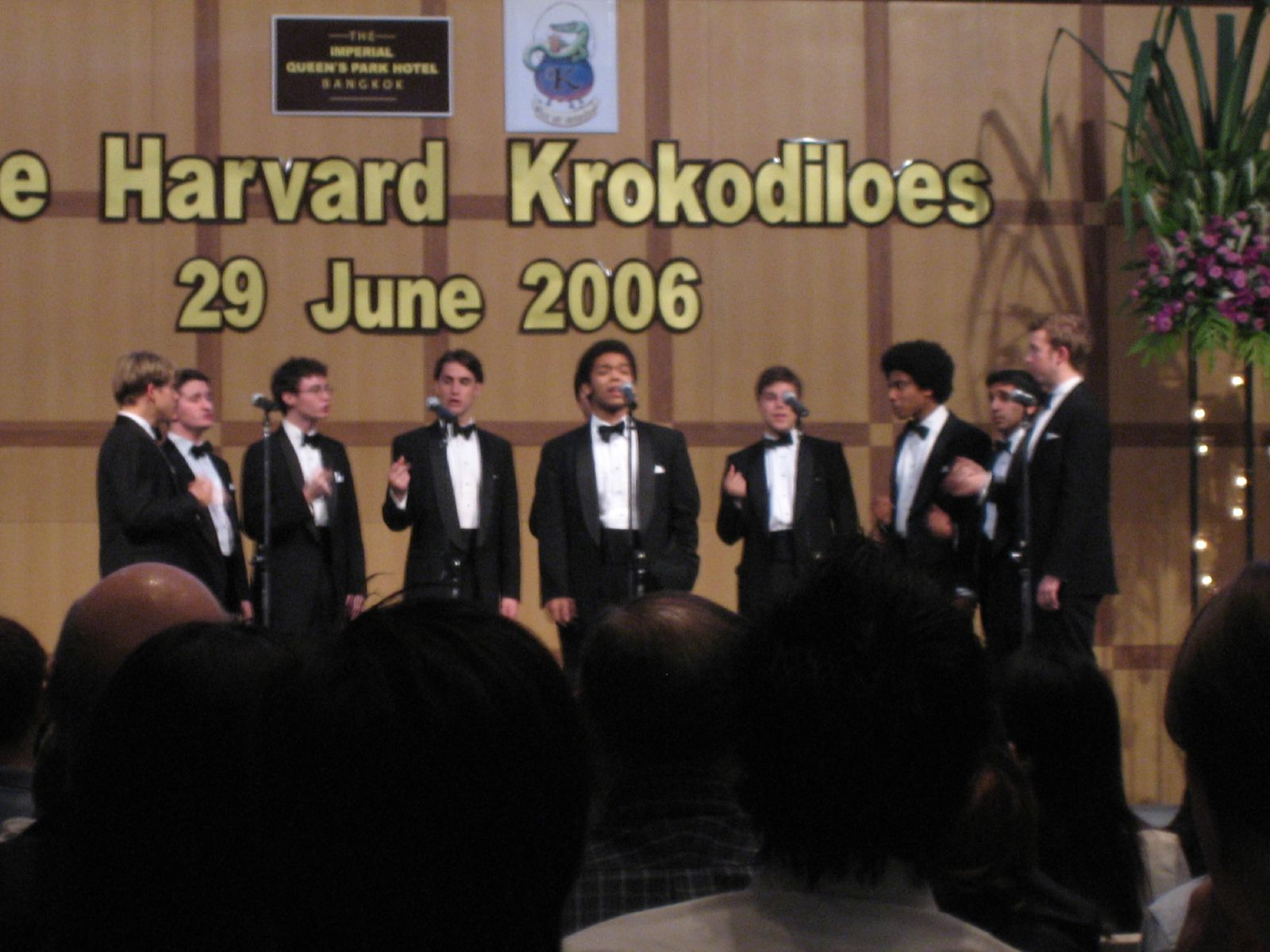
- The Harvard Krokodiloes of 2006

Background information
- Also known as: The Kroks
- Origin: Cambridge, Massachusetts, U.S.
- Genre: A cappella
- Years active: 1946–present
- Website: www.kroks.com

YouTube information
- Channel: Harvard Krokodiloes
- Genre: Music
- Subscribers: 67.7 thousand
- Views: 11.7 million
- Last updated: March 3, 2025

The Harvard Krokodiloes ("The Kroks") are Harvard University's oldest a cappella singing group, founded in 1946. The group consists of twelve tuxedo-clad undergraduates, and they bill their repertoire as "songs from the Great American Songbook and beyond".

The group has performed on The Tonight Show Starring Johnny Carson, Good Morning America, NPR, and on numerous international national television programs. Every January, the Krokodiloes travel across the USA singing for various private and public concerts, and each summer, the Krokodiloes travel around the world on an eleven-week, six-continent tour. They have recorded 38 albums.

They derive their name from the ancient Greek word for crocodile, krokodilos. The group's motto is Nunc Est Cantandum, or "Now is the time to sing".

== History ==
The Kroks were founded in 1946, when four members of the Hasty Pudding Club, popular for its drag musical theater productions, began singing popular hits of their time in four-part harmony.

The Krokodiloes have performed around the world for hosts including Ella Fitzgerald, Princess Grace of Monaco, Princess Caroline of Monaco, the Aga Khan, and King Bhumibol of Thailand. They had a particularly close relationship with Leonard Bernstein, who became friends with the group first in 1973, when he composed a setting to an E. E. Cummings poem "if you can't eat". In 1983, Bernstein wrote an original song for the group, "Screwed On Wrong", and provided an introductory letter that helped launch the group's first annual international summer tour.

Since 1989 the group has appeared four times at Carnegie Hall: debuting there to a sold-out audience in 1989 at a concert to benefit world hunger, in the spring of 1995 in an American Red Cross benefit, in May 1998 in a concert for Mothers Against Drunk Driving, and most recently at Zankel Hall in March 2008.

In 1993, the Kroks performed as the opening act at the New England Inaugural Ball celebrating the inauguration of US President Bill Clinton.

In 1997, the Kroks performed at the June 30 Hong Kong handover ceremonies commemorating the return of Hong Kong to China.

== Notable alumni ==
The year of each alumnus's Harvard graduation is indicated in parentheses.

- John Axelrod (1988) – conductor
- Paris Barclay (1979) – Emmy-winning television director
- Matthew Bohrer (2010) – actor
- James Bundy (1981) – theater director and Dean of the Yale School of Drama
- Francis Cabot (1949) – horticulturalist and founder of The Garden Conservancy
- George Howe Colt (1976) – journalist and National Book Award-nominated author
- Gregory Craig (1967) – former White House Counsel under President Barack Obama
- Charles Dunbar (1959) – former U.S. ambassador to Qatar and Yemen
- Razaak Eniola (2015) – musician and content creator
- Richard Despard Estes (1950) – biologist specializing in African mammals
- Miles Fisher (2006) – actor and musician
- William B. Gray (1964) – former U.S. Attorney for the District of Vermont
- Fred Gwynne (1951) – actor known for Car 54, Where Are You? and The Munsters
- Winthrop Jordan (1953) – historian and National Book Award winner
- William Kuntz (1972) – senior U.S. District Judge for the Eastern District of New York
- Peter Lerangis (1977) – children's author known for the Seven Wonders and The 39 Clues series
- Ryan Leslie (1998) – Grammy-nominated singer-songwriter and producer
- David Livingston (1961) – cancer researcher and Harvard Medical School professor
- George C. Lodge (1950) – former U.S. Assistant Secretary of Labor
- Michael Mitnick (2006) – playwright and screenwriter known for The Giver
- Laurence O’Keefe (1991) – composer and lyricist of Legally Blonde and Bat Boy: The Musical
- Mark O’Keefe (1993) – screenwriter and producer of Bruce Almighty and Click
- Walter Paine (1949) – journalist and longtime editor of the Valley News
- Bob Parlin (1985) – educator and LGBTQ+ activist
- James Paul (1963) – writer and founding Executive Director of the Global Policy Forum
- Donald Pfaff (1961) – neuroscientist
- Phillip Price Jr. (1956) – former Pennsylvania State Senator
- Fred Reichheld (1974) – author and business strategist
- Amir Siraj (2021) – astrophysicist
- Sherrod E. Skinner Jr. (1951) – U.S. Marine and Medal of Honor recipient
- Alan Wachman (1980) – scholar of East Asian politics and international relations
