= Sweet Adelines International quartet competitions, 2010–2019 =

The results of the Sweet Adelines International competition for quartets in the years 2010–2019 are as follows.

For the equivalent scores in the chorus competition see Sweet Adelines International chorus competitions, 2010–2019 and full explanation of the scoring system, qualification process, awards and records, see Sweet Adelines International competition.

Note that the grand total listed in the "final" column is the cumulative total of scores achieved in the semi-final and final rounds of competition. Quartets can contain members who are registered in different regions, in which case all their regions are listed. However, they must qualify through one of those regions - that one is marked in bold. In addition to the direct-qualifying places, wildcard places are awarded to the 10 highest-scoring non-winning quartets across all regional competitions. This is indicated as "[wild]". Quartets which place 2nd–15th in the international quartet competition are also allowed to qualify directly for the following year if they wish, without competing at the regional level. This is indicated by "[pre-qualified]".

== 2010 ==
Seattle, Washington (2010)Official results
Place	Region	Contestant	Regional	Semi-final		Final		
Place	Region	Contestant	Score	Order of appearance	Score	Order of appearance	Score	Grand total
1	1, 19	MAXX Factor	^{[pre-qualified]}	29	1413	9	1480	2893
2	2, 9, 13, 19	Journey	^{[pre-qualified]}	26	1363	6	1419	2782
3	19	Capri	^{[pre-qualified]}	9	1334	3	1387	2721
4	12	LoveNotes	^{[pre-qualified]}	32	1241	7	1406	2647
5	3, 23, 26	Martini	^{[pre-qualified]}	34	1289	1	1344	2633
6	16	Spritzer	^{[pre-qualified]}	27	1289	5	1265	2554
7	13, 26	Mojo	^{[pre-qualified]}	8^{[a]}	1260	8	1289	2549
8	9	Bling!	659	31	1221	10	1311	2532
9	13	LiveWire	628	28	1226	2	1292	2518
10	11, 21	Shimmer!	^{[pre-qualified]}	13	1247	4	1259	2506
11	5, **25**	Timeless	643	11	1219	—	—	—
12	35	Even Time	630	30	1217	—	—	—
13	21 ^{[wild]}	Hypnotic	615	3	1198	—	—	—
14	4	Lucky Day	601	22	1194	—	—	—
15	32	Vocality	639	50	1192	—	—	—
16	21 ^{[wild]}	SparX	640	33	1188	—	—	—
17	6 ^{[wild]}	ICE!	607	43	1184	—	—	—
18	11	Sirens	629	21	1180	—	—	—
19	21 ^{[wild]}	Affinity	611	18	1178	—	—	—
20	2	Overture	604	46	1177	—	—	—
21	7, 25	Cabaret	^{[pre-qualified]}	4	1173	—	—	—
22	1	Boston Accent	600	48	1168	—	—	—
23	26	Over the Moon	603	45	1165	—	—	—
24	21	One Voice	640	17	1138	—	—	—
25	31	Finesse UK	623	5	1134	—	—	—
26	22	NRG!	602	44	1132	—	—	—
27	9, 15, 19	a.k.a.	^{[pre-qualified]}	19	1130	—	—	—
28	23	Virtuosity	594	24	1128	—	—	—
29	10	Oasis	610	2	1128	—	—	—
30	5	Voice 4 Voice	593	41	1126	—	—	—
31	34	iCappella	589	20	1118	—	—	—
32	8	Synergy	606	40	1116	—	—	—
33	17	B.L.A.K. Velvet	606	16	1109	—	—	—
34	7	Legacy	590	38	1108	—	—	—
35	12	PDQ	617	23	1106	—	—	—
36	3	IMPACT!!	608	47	1099	—	—	—
37	31 ^{[wild]}	Eu4ia	603	25	1088	—	—	—
38	12 ^{[wild]}	Taylor Made	603	6	1082	—	—	—
39	9	Dream Girls	608	15^{[a]}	1077	—	—	—
40	35 ^{[wild]}	Sing Spiration	599	42	1073	—	—	—
41	15	Escape	582	39	1056	—	—	—
42	19	Whole Lotta Harmony	608	12	1056	—	—	—
43	16	Here & Now!	569	10	1055	—	—	—
44	24	Fourth Avenue	577	49	1030	—	—	—
45	6	S.A.S.S.	609	37	1026	—	—	—
46	14	Sound Advice	590	36^{[a]}	1024	—	—	—
47	32 ^{[wild]}	Off the Record	606	1	1016	—	—	—

^{a} ReMix, Spirit and Razzcals quartets qualified and were to compete in position number 7, 14 and 35 respectively but all withdrew from the competition before it began. Therefore Mojo competed 7th but are officially listed as contestant number 8, Dream Girls are officially listed as contestant number 15 and Sound Advice as contestant number 36.

== 2011 ==
Houston, Texas (2011)Official results
Place	Region	Contestant	Regional	Semi-final		Final		
Place	Region	Contestant	Score	Order of appearance	Score	Order of appearance	Score	Grand total
1	3, 23, 26	Martini	^{[pre-qualified]}	46	1388	8	1475	2863
2	**9**, 21, 24	Touché	655	13	1344	5	1440	2784
3	9, **15**, 19	a.k.a.	634	18	1344	7	1404	2748
4	32	ReMix	633	30	1323	1	1409	2732
5	12	LoveNotes	^{[pre-qualified]}	32	1310	3	1368	2678
6	19	Capri	^{[pre-qualified]}	47	1334	6	1312	2646
7	9	Bling!	^{[pre-qualified]}	48	1307	10	1335	2642
8	**13**, 26	Frenzy	621	45	1313	9	1396	2609
9	32	Vocality	^{[pre-qualified]}	35	1258	2	1320	2578
10	31	Finesse	613	28	1247	4	1271	2518
11	3	ROXY	654	44	1246	—	—	—
12	4, 10	Lucky Day	^{[pre-qualified]}	39	1231	—	—	—
13	11, 21, 24	Shimmer!	^{[pre-qualified]}	17	1216	—	—	—
14	21	Unlimited	613	49	1214	—	—	—
15	9 ^{[wild]}	Live Out Loud	619	24	1207	—	—	—
16	19 ^{[wild]}	Whole Lotta Harmony	608	21	1201	—	—	—
17	8	Bounce	603	9	1201	—	—	—
18	7	Legacy	604	27	1177	—	—	—
19	35	Even Time	^{[pre-qualified]}	5	1175	—	—	—
20	21 ^{[wild]}	Charmed	605	16	1165	—	—	—
21	10	Oasis	606	29	1163	—	—	—
22	3 ^{[wild]}	PipeDreams	615	4	1158	—	—	—
23	25	Myst	597	7	1151	—	—	—
24	3 ^{[wild]}	IMPACT!!	622	10	1143	—	—	—
25	6 ^{[wild]}	S.A.S.S.	605	43	1137	—	—	—
26	22 ^{[wild]}	Premiere	613	14	1136	—	—	—
27	2	Overture	607	22	1128	—	—	—
28	13, 26	LiveWire	^{[pre-qualified]}	41	1118	—	—	—
29	26	Easy Street	614	23	1103	—	—	—
30	3 ^{[wild]}	Chi-Town Sound	621	11	1095	—	—	—
31	24	Soundwave	600	42	1092	—	—	—
32	23	Dream	616	33	1075	—	—	—
33	**14**, 19 ^{[wild]}	Escapade	611	6	1074	—	—	—
34	19	Lustre	618	34	1071	—	—	—
35	35	Aftershock!	573	2	1068	—	—	—
36	**5**, 14	Shades of Jade	598	38^{[a]}	1066	—	—	—
37	14 ^{[wild]}	Sound Advice	605	25	1059	—	—	—
38	4, **17**	TGIF	569	15	1058	—	—	—
39	1	Without Warning	602	3	1041	—	—	—
40	16	Here & Now	600	1	1036	—	—	—
41	12	PDQ	605	36	1035	—	—	—
42	4	In Sync	605	40	1034	—	—	—
43	**11**, 12	Cheers!	609	8	1017	—	—	—
44	3, **22**	NRG!	615	31	1013	—	—	—
45	14	Sapphire	616	20	1007	—	—	—
46	6	Keepin' Outta Mischief	612	12	982	—	—	—

^{a} iCappella qualified and were to compete in position number 37 but withdrew from the competition before it began. Therefore Shades of Jade competed 37th but are officially listed as contestant number 38.

== 2012 ==
Denver, Colorado (2012)Official results
Place	Region	Contestant	Regional	Semi-final		Final			Competition video availability
Place	Region	Contestant	Score	Order of appearance	Score	Order of appearance	Score	Grand total	Competition video availability
1	9, 21, 24	Touché	^{[pre-qualified]}	32^{[a]}	1398	2	1432	2830	semi-final final
2	9	Bling!	^{[pre-qualified]}	50	1360	1	1430	2790	semi-final final
3	12	LoveNotes	^{[pre-qualified]}	25	1338	7	1395	2733	semi-final final
4	13, 26	Frenzy	^{[pre-qualified]}	30	1257	4	1390	2647	semi-final final
5	32	ReMix	^{[pre-qualified]}	8	1273	8	1312	2585	semi-final final
6	9, 15, 19	a.k.a.	^{[pre-qualified]}	42	1313	9	1258	2571	semi-final —
7	19	Lustre	611	16	1257	3	1304	2561	semi-final —
8	16	Spritzer	644	2	1237	5	1299	2536	semi-final —
9	31	Finesse	^{[pre-qualified]}	39	1259	10	1276	2535	semi-final —
10	21	Dolce	619	10	1251	6	1241	2492	semi-final —
11	32	Vocality	^{[pre-qualified]}	41^{[a]}	1235	—	—	—	—
12	14	Speed of Sound	630	19	1220	—	—	—	—
13	9	Live Out Loud	^{[pre-qualified]}	1	1211	—	—	—	—
14	26	Glow	595	52	1206	—	—	—	—
15	7	Legacy	625	23	1194	—	—	—	—
16	3	ROXY	^{[pre-qualified]}	13	1192	—	—	—	—
17	32 ^{[wild]}	Sway	607	24	1178	—	—	—	—
18	35	Even Time	617	28	1176	—	—	—	—
19	4, 10, 25	Lucky Day	^{[pre-qualified]}	26	1162	—	—	—	—
20	8	Bounce	621	6	1158	—	—	—	—
21	32	Kräm	643	27	1151	—	—	—	—
22	31 ^{[wild]}	Miss-Demeanour	602	33	1140	—	—	—	—
23	23	Dream	630	49^{[a]}	1136	—	—	—	—
24	2, **17**	Naturally	594	5	1128	—	—	—	—
25	3	Hi-Fi	593	37	1127	—	—	—	—
26	25	Myst	616	14	1124	—	—	—	—
27	31	Echo	606	3	1118	—	—	—	—
28	34	Hi-Jinx	624	44^{[a]}	1117	—	—	—	—
29	6	Cabernet	609	45	1113	—	—	—	—
30	1	Boston Accent	596	9	1111	—	—	—	—
31	22	Premiere	610	38	1110	—	—	—	—
32	6 ^{[wild]}	Medallion	601	29	1109	—	—	—	—
33	8 ^{[wild]}	Ruby Blue	621	11	1100	—	—	—	—
34	6 ^{[wild]}	Keepin' Outta Mischief	605	21	1084	—	—	—	—
35	13 ^{[wild]}	Pepper	611	51	1076	—	—	—	—
36	24	Soundwave	572	22	1063	—	—	—	—
37	21	Unlimited	^{[pre-qualified]}	36	1058	—	—	—	—
38	**14**, 19 ^{[wild]}	Escapade	606	47	1057	—	—	—	—
39	10	Soundwise	590	15	1052	—	—	—	—
40	16 ^{[wild]}	Phoenix Rising	607	4	1046	—	—	—	—
41	5	Voice 4 Voice	589	35	1040	—	—	—	—
42	11	Cachet	592	7	1034	—	—	—	—
43	12	PDQ	605	12	1030	—	—	—	—
44	**13**, 15, 22	Backbeat	612	20	1016	—	—	—	—
45	9	Sassy	581	18^{[a]}	1007	—	—	—	—
46	4	Joyful Noise	592	34	998	—	—	—	—
47	19 ^{[wild]}	Notorious	602	46	995	—	—	—	—

^{a} Shimmer, East Coast Style, Capri, Firefly and Whole Lotta Harmony quartets qualified and were to compete in position number 17, 31, 40, 43 and 48 respectively but all withdrew from the competition before it began. Therefore Sassy competed 17th but are officially listed as contestant number 18, Touché are officially listed as contestant number 32, Vocality as 41, Hi-Jinx as 44 and Dream as 49.

== 2013 ==
Honolulu, Hawaii (2013)Official results
Place	Region	Contestant	Regional		Semi-final		Final			Competition video availability
Place	Region	Contestant	Score	Summary	Order of appearance	Score	Order of appearance	Score	Grand total	Competition video availability
1	12	LoveNotes	^{[pre-qualified]}		7	1402	7	1469	2871	semi-final final
2	9	Bling!	^{[pre-qualified]}		15	1360	10	1435	2795	semi-final final
3	1, 9, 15	a.k.a.	^{[pre-qualified]}		3	1330	8	1377	2707	semi-final final
4	31	Finesse	^{[pre-qualified]}		45	1339	5	1367	2706	semi-final final
5	19	Lustre	^{[pre-qualified]}		28	1286	2	1383	2669	semi-final final
6	7	HEAT	636		42	1300	3	1352	2652	semi-final final
7	13, 26	Frenzy	^{[pre-qualified]}		9	1277	4	1362	2639	semi-final final
8	16	Spritzer	^{[pre-qualified]}		11	1305	6	1333	2638	semi-final final
9	14	Speed of Sound	^{[pre-qualified]}		19	1262	9	1366	2628	semi-final final
10	26	Glow	^{[pre-qualified]}		25	1237	1	1304	2541	semi-final final
11	13	Yahtzee	635		48	1222	—	—	—	—
12	32	Vocality	^{[pre-qualified]}		26	1211	—	—	—	—
13	31	Fortuity	656		6	1211	—	—	—	—
14	25	Rio!	602		20	207	—	—	—	—
15	21	Dolce	^{[pre-qualified]}		14	1207	—	—	—	—
16	21	ConTempo	612		22	1191	—	—	—	—
17	19	GQ	599		16	1186	—	—	—	—
18	7	Legacy	^{[pre-qualified]}		12	1180	—	—	—	—
19	34	Hi-Jinx	610		31	1178	—	—	—	—
20	23	Dream	589		32	1175	—	—	—	—
21	26	Easy Street	596		39	1172	—	—	—	—
22	9	Live Out Loud	^{[pre-qualified]}		49	1168	—	—	—	—
23	3	PipeDreams	582		37	1156	—	—	—	—
24	6	Keepin' Outta Mischief	612		41	1145	—	—	—	—
25	22	Epix	606		33	1120	—	—	—	—
26	32	Frank	608		21	1115	—	—	—	—
27	13 ^{[wild]}	Lip Sync	600		24	1111	—	—	—	—
28	11	Sirens	599		43	1108	—	—	—	—
29	1	Boston Accent	609		51	1107	—	—	—	—
30	17	Naturally	609		5	1101	—	—	—	—
31	31 ^{[wild]}	Echo	614		2^{[a]}	1090	—	—	—	—
32	16	One Track Mind	615		30	1090	—	—	—	—
33	15	Drive!	611		44	1089	—	—	—	—
34	24	Rogue	612		35	1084	—	—	—	—
35	8	Ruby Blue	610		17	1077	—	—	—	—
36	32 ^{[wild]}	Kräm	608		4	1071	—	—	—	—
37	6 ^{[wild]}	S.A.S.S.	601		36	1068	—	—	—	—
38	4	iTones	589		52	1063	—	—	—	—
39	2	Firefly	604		29	1057	—	—	—	—
40	10	5 O'clock Somewhere	609		34	1054	—	—	—	—
41	2 ^{[wild]}	Allure	598		8	1051	—	—	—	—
42	35	Sweet Life	605		50	1049	—	—	—	—
43	10 ^{[wild]}	Essence	597		38	1040	—	—	—	—
44	10 ^{[wild]}	Soundwise	608		13	1032	—	—	—	—
45	16 ^{[wild]}	En Route	603		10	1025	—	—	—	—
46	9	Quatro	600		27	1024	—	—	—	—
47	16 ^{[wild]}	Running with Scissors	604		18	1013	—	—	—	—
48	14 ^{[wild]}	Fire & Ice	602		46	1013	—	—	—	—
49	12	FlipSide	590		40	1006	—	—	—	—
50	14	Shades of Jade	602		23	996	—	—	—	—
51	5	Vivid Image	564		47	965	—	—	—	—

^{a} ReMix quartet qualified and were to compete in position number 1 but all withdrew from the competition before it began. Therefore Echo competed 1st but are officially listed as contestant number 2.

== 2014 ==
Baltimore, Maryland (2014)Official results
Place	Region	Contestant	Regional		Semi-final		Final			Competition video availability: Semi-finals Finals
Place	Region	Contestant	Score	Summary	Order of appearance	Score	Order of appearance	Score	Grand total	Competition video availability: Semi-finals Finals
1	9	Bling!	^{[pre-qualified]}		19	1366	5	1451	2817	semi-final final acceptance
2	14	Speed of Sound	^{[pre-qualified]}		4	1347	7	1410	2757	semi-final final
3	31	Finesse	^{[pre-qualified]}		36^{[a]}	1308	3	1395	2703	semi-final final
4	7	HEAT	^{[pre-qualified]}		26	1315	9	1314	2629	semi-final final
5	13, 26	Frenzy	^{[pre-qualified]}		18	1288	8	1326	2614	semi-final final
6	19	Lustre	^{[pre-qualified]}		16	1269	6	1344	2613	semi-final final
7	32	Milli Blink	654		2	1267	2	1324	2591	semi-final final
8	2, **4**, 14	CRUSH	622		27	1297	10	1264	2561	semi-final final
9	16	Spritzer	^{[pre-qualified]}		17	1248	4	1286	2534	semi-final final
10	32	Vocality	^{[pre-qualified]}		1	1240	1	1293	2533	semi-final final
11	19	GQ	624		39	1236	—	—	—	—
12	25	Rio!	^{[pre-qualified]}		23	1235	—	—	—	—
13	26	Glow	^{[pre-qualified]}		25^{[a]}	1232	—	—	—	—
14	3	ROXY	638		29	1203	—	—	—	—
15	1 ^{[wild]}	Boston Accent	602		3	1179	—	—	—	—
16	31	Fortuity	^{[pre-qualified]}		43	1170	—	—	—	—
17	3 ^{[wild]}	Epix	625		40	1170	—	—	—	—
18	2, **17**	Naturally	608		33	1168	—	—	—	—
19	34	HiJinx	625		9	1163	—	—	—	—
20	**8**, 21 ^{[wild]}	Swoon	609		46	1157	—	—	—	—
21	21	ConTempo	621		44	1155	—	—	—	—
22	5	Legacy	623		8	1150	—	—	—	—
23	4 ^{[wild]}	In Sync	611		32^{[a]}	1140	—	—	—	—
24	6	Keepin' Outta Mischief	610		22	1137	—	—	—	—
25	31	Domino	594		42	1132	—	—	—	—
26	26	Easy Street	595		34	1129	—	—	—	—
27	13	Yahtzee	^{[pre-qualified]}		11	1128	—	—	—	—
28	8	Ruby Blue	610		38	1126	—	—	—	—
29	3 ^{[wild]}	PipeDreams	609		45	1125	—	—	—	—
30	25	BLAZE!	597		15	1114	—	—	—	—
31	17, **21** ^{[wild]}	Aloha Spirit	605		47	1111	—	—	—	—
32	12	Rogue	612		14	1099	—	—	—	—
33	**11**, 21	Cheers!	608		5	1086	—	—	—	—
34	34 ^{[wild]}	BroadBand	606		37	1083	—	—	—	—
35	15	Foreign Exchange	611		28	1071	—	—	—	—
36	2	Firefly	609		7	1068	—	—	—	—
37	16	S.L.A.M.!	625		10	1061	—	—	—	—
38	**15**, 19 ^{[wild]}	Drive!	608		13	1055	—	—	—	—
39	13	Pepper	595		20	1046	—	—	—	—
40	9	Attitude	601		30	1043	—	—	—	—
41	35	Key Note	585		21	1037	—	—	—	—
42	1	Full Throttle	618		6	1031	—	—	—	—
43	10	5 O'clock Somewhere!	609		48	1027	—	—	—	—
44	14	Shades of Jade	607		41	1015	—	—	—	—
45	16 ^{[wild]}	En Route	602		12	1004	—	—	—	—

^{a} Dolce, Swingline and a.k.a. quartets qualified and were to compete in position number 24, 31 and 35 respectively but all withdrew from the competition before it began. Therefore Glow competed 24th but are officially listed as contestant number 25, In Sync are officially listed as contestant number 32 and Finesse as contestant number 36.

== 2015 ==
The 2015 competition was held on 6 and 9 October at the MGM Grand Las Vegas.

Las Vegas, Nevada (2015)Official results
Place	Region	Contestant	Regional		Semi-final		Final			Competition video availability: Semi-finals Finals
Place	Region	Contestant	Score	Summary	Order of appearance	Score	Order of appearance	Score	Grand total	Competition video availability: Semi-finals Finals
1	14	Speed of Sound	^{[pre-qualified]}		26	1395	7	1427	2822	semi-final final
2	13, 26	Frenzy	^{[pre-qualified]}		38	1366	1	1392	2758	semi-final final
3	19	Lustre	^{[pre-qualified]}		14	1392	6	1357	2749	semi-final final
4	9	Windsor	660		13	1340	2	1319	2659	semi-final final
5	31	Finesse	^{[pre-qualified]}		48	1355	5	1271	2624	semi-final final
6	32	Milli Blink	^{[pre-qualified]}		41	1296	4	1267	2563	semi-final final
7	7	HEAT	^{[pre-qualified]}		27	1299	3	1222	2521	semi-final final
8	5 ^{[wild]}	ClassRing	645		6	1262	9	1228	2490	semi-final final
9	26	Glow	^{[pre-qualified]}		20	1263	8	1224	2487	semi-final final
10	2, 4, 14	CRUSH	^{[pre-qualified]}		7	1264	10	1220	2484	semi-final final
11	16	Spritzer	^{[pre-qualified]}		18	1234	—	—	—	—
12	13 ^{[wild]}	PrimeTime	652		34	1225	—	—	—	—
13	32	Vocality	^{[pre-qualified]}		23	1221	—	—	—	—
14	31 ^{[wild]}	Fortuity	614		25	1219	—	—	—	—
15	19	Famous Janes	620		22	1216	—	—	—	—
16	5	Legacy	660		28	1216	—	—	—	—
17	1	VOCE	606		46	1213	—	—	—	—
18	25	Rio!	^{[pre-qualified]}		10	1213	—	—	—	—
19	9 ^{[wild]}	Monarch	654		16^{[a]}	1204	—	—	—	—
20	4	Tenacious	612		47	1202	—	—	—	—
21	21	Delilah	632		29	1199	—	—	—	—
22	34	HiJinx	628		11	1198	—	—	—	—
23	13 ^{[wild]}	SoundFX	612		33	1197	—	—	—	—
24	3	Epix	621		37	1183	—	—	—	—
25	8	Ruby Blue	621		39	1179	—	—	—	—
26	10	Live it Up	616		9	1167	—	—	—	—
27	3	ROXY	^{[pre-qualified]}		8	1156	—	—	—	—
28	13	Pepper	654		4	1144	—	—	—	—
29	25	BLAZE	619		12	1134	—	—	—	—
30	32 ^{[wild]}	MACC	615		32	1131	—	—	—	—
31	31	Hot Note	615		35	1127	—	—	—	—
32	17 ^{[wild]}	Naturally	616		40	1126	—	—	—	—
33	1	Boston Accent	^{[pre-qualified]}		24	1119	—	—	—	—
34	6	Star Burst	621		17	1114	—	—	—	—
35	15	One Track Mind	621		45	1104	—	—	—	—
36	11	Cachet	570		43	1091	—	—	—	—
37	5 ^{[wild]}	Fierce	625		21	1087	—	—	—	—
38	16	S.L.A.M.	599		3	1074	—	—	—	—
39	35	MOLTO	597		30	1069	—	—	—	—
40	32	Rizzo	620		19	1068	—	—	—	—
41	26	No Strings	583		5	1067	—	—	—	—
42	3 ^{[wild]}	Off The Record	616		2	1062	—	—	—	—
43	17	Surefire	623		31	1059	—	—	—	—
44	13 ^{[wild]}	The Four Get Me Nots	618		1	1050	—	—	—	—
45	14	Boss	593		42	1049	—	—	—	—
46	2	Fascination	595		44	1037	—	—	—	—
47	12	Surprise	600		36	1025	—	—	—	—

^{a} GQ quartet qualified and was to compete in position number 15 but withdrew from the competition before it began. Therefore Monarch competed in 15th position but are officially listed as contestant number 16.

== 2016 ==
The 2016 competition was held on 17–22 October at the MGM Grand Las Vegas, the first time the competition was held at the same location twice in a row. The finalists included two quartets which had previously won the Rising Star competition (ClassRing and GQ) and a third (Windsor) with three members of two past Rising Star winning quartets — Royal Blush and The Ladies.

Las Vegas, Nevada (2016)Official results
Place	Region	Contestant	Regional		Semi-final		Final			Competition video availability: Semi-finals Finals
Place	Region	Contestant	Score	Summary	Order of appearance	Score	Order of appearance	Score	Grand total	Competition video availability: Semi-finals Finals
1	13, 26	Frenzy	^{[pre-qualified]}		12	1378	10	1421	2799	semi-final final
2	9	Windsor	^{[pre-qualified]}		46	1343	5	1384	2727	semi-final final
3	19	Lustre	^{[pre-qualified]}		9	1363	9	1351	2714	semi-final final
4	31	Finesse	^{[pre-qualified]}		15^{[a]}	1336	1	1323	2659	semi-final final
5	5	ClassRing	^{[pre-qualified]}		2^{[a]}	1336	2	1315	2651	semi-final final
6	16	Spritzer	^{[pre-qualified]}		36	1313	3	1336	2649	semi-final final
7	19	GQ	669		38	1287	7	1240	2527	semi-final final
8	7	HEAT	^{[pre-qualified]}		10	1275	4	1245	2520	semi-final final
9	32	Milli Blink	^{[pre-qualified]}		42	1237	6	1261	2498	semi-final final
10	4	Glamour	662		19	1279	8	1193	2472	semi-final final
11	1	VOCE	622		37	1232	—	—	—	semi-final —
12	4 ^{[wild]}	Tenacious	659		8	1228	—	—	—	semi-final —
13	32	Vocality	^{[pre-qualified]}		4	1223	—	—	—	semi-final —
14	10	Live It Up!	620		26	1216	—	—	—	semi-final —
15	6	Sparkle!	618		29	1214	—	—	—	semi-final —
16	19 ^{[wild]}	Neon Lights	660		22	1202	—	—	—	semi-final —
17	8	Ruby Blue	626		34	1199	—	—	—	semi-final —
18	32 ^{[wild]}	Twist	606		45	1175	—	—	—	semi-final —
19	34	Hi-Jinx	623		43	1172	—	—	—	semi-final —
20	19	Famous Janes	^{[pre-qualified]}		28	1172	—	—	—	semi-final —
21	1 ^{[wild]}	Boston Accent	605		33	1169	—	—	—	semi-final —
22	31	Fortuity	^{[pre-qualified]}		3	1162	—	—	—	semi-final —
23	32 ^{[wild]}	MACC	606		25	1157	—	—	—	semi-final —
24	25	Rio!	625		7	1134	—	—	—	semi-final —
25	5	Legacy	629		44	1129	—	—	—	semi-final —
26	26	No Strings	621		27	1127	—	—	—	semi-final —
27	26 ^{[wild]}	Uptown Suite!	604		39	1119	—	—	—	semi-final —
28	21	C'est la vie	613		47	1114	—	—	—	semi-final —
29	32	SVEA	616		16	1110	—	—	—	semi-final —
30	13	PrimeTime	^{[pre-qualified]}		32	1095	—	—	—	semi-final —
31	12	Turbulence	614		5	1075	—	—	—	semi-final —
32	21 ^{[wild]}	SpinOff	608		21^{[a]}	1071	—	—	—	semi-final —
33	35	MOLTO!	608		35	1067	—	—	—	semi-final —
34	9	Premier	619		18	1061	—	—	—	semi-final —
35	13	Wink	616		41^{[a]}	1059	—	—	—	semi-final —
36	14	Boss.	590		11	1056	—	—	—	semi-final —
37	3	By Request	596		24	1044	—	—	—	semi-final —
38	31	The MIX	618		17	1040	—	—	—	semi-final —
39	17	Fusion	566		48	1027	—	—	—	semi-final —
40	35 ^{[wild]}	Aftershock!	607		6	1026	—	—	—	semi-final —
41	9 ^{[wild]}	Ciao Bella	610		30	1025	—	—	—	semi-final —
42	16	Power Chords	602		13	1014	—	—	—	semi-final —
43	11	Cachet	580		23	1010	—	—	—	semi-final —
44	2	Fascination!	595		31	977	—	—	—	semi-final —

^{a} Swingline, CRUSH, Glow and Drive! quartets all qualified and were to compete as contestants number 1, 14, 26 and 40. but withdrew from the competition before it began. Therefore subsequent contestants competed in those places but retain their original contestant numbers.

== 2017 ==
The 2017 competition was held on 11 and 13 October. For the third year running, it was held at the MGM Grand Las Vegas.

Las Vegas, Nevada (2017)Official results
Place	Region	Contestant	Regional		Semi-final		Final			Competition video availability: Semi-finals Finals
Place	Region	Contestant	Score	Summary	Order of appearance	Score	Order of appearance	Score	Grand total	Competition video availability: Semi-finals Finals
1	19	Lustre	^{[pre-qualified]}		11^{[a]}	1450	2	1485	2935	semi-final final
2	5	ClassRing	^{[pre-qualified]}		42	1353	8	1431	2784	semi-final final
3	9	Windsor	^{[pre-qualified]}		15	1364	6	1343	2707	semi-final final
4	16	Spritzer	^{[pre-qualified]}		36	1371	7	1334	2705	semi-final final
5	19	GQ	^{[pre-qualified]}		43	1303	10	1354	2657	semi-final final
6	25	TITANIUM	655		23	1315	4	1331	2646	semi-final final
7	4	Glamour	^{[pre-qualified]}		46	1328	1	1308	2636	semi-final final
8	4	Tenacious	^{[pre-qualified]}		12	1289	5	1320	2609	semi-final final
9	31	Finesse	^{[pre-qualified]}		40	1307	3	1281	2588	semi-final final
10	5	Pizzazz!	633		26	1283	9	1284	2567	semi-final final
11	13 ^{[wild]}	Renegade	640		33	1281	—	—	—	semi-final —
12	19	Famous Janes	659		41	1261	—	—	—	semi-final —
13	1	VOCE	^{[pre-qualified]}		5	1257	—	—	—	semi-final —
14	13	PrimeTime	656		31	1255	—	—	—	semi-final —
15	26	Glow	612		1	1233	—	—	—	semi-final —
16	6	Sparkle!	^{[pre-qualified]}		32	1228	—	—	—	semi-final —
17	10	Live It Up!	^{[pre-qualified]}		8	1199	—	—	—	semi-final —
18	9	Premier	621		30	1197	—	—	—	semi-final —
19	19 ^{[wild]}	Neon Lights	626		14	1176	—	—	—	semi-final —
20	10	Essence	594		29	1175	—	—	—	semi-final —
21	9 ^{[wild]}	Ringtones	607		25	1159	—	—	—	semi-final —
22	4	Spot On	612		21	1151	—	—	—	semi-final —
23	21	C'est la vie	620		44	1135	—	—	—	semi-final —
24	11	Ringin' Again!	611		2	1133	—	—	—	semi-final —
25	8	Ruby Blue	597		39^{[a]}	1113	—	—	—	semi-final —
26	15	Harmony	645		35	1111	—	—	—	semi-final —
27	26 ^{[wild]}	No Strings	607		13	1106	—	—	—	semi-final —
28	1	Boston Accent	616		37	1099	—	—	—	semi-final —
29	14	Up All Night	594		9	1089	—	—	—	semi-final —
30	6	Spice	593		47	1087	—	—	—	semi-final —
31	12	Fresco	607		34	1082	—	—	—	semi-final —
32	34	Debacle	588		24	1073	—	—	—	semi-final —
33	5 ^{[wild]}	Take 4	612		45	1073	—	—	—	semi-final —
34	35	L'Attitude	614		6	1064	—	—	—	semi-final —
35	2	The Vibe	603		17	1056	—	—	—	—
36	13 ^{[wild]}	SnapShot!	611		7	1055	—	—	—	semi-final —
37	16	Power Chords	580		28^{[a]}	1041	—	—	—	semi-final —
38	3	Quest	568		3	1038	—	—	—	semi-final —
39	25 ^{[wild]}	Couture	608		18	1022	—	—	—	semi-final —
40	17	Fusion	603		4	1002	—	—	—	semi-final —
41	25 ^{[wild]}	Perfect Storm	608		16	1001	—	—	—	semi-final —
42	32	RING	614		22	995	—	—	—	semi-final —
43	13 ^{[wild]}	Fourcast	619		20	975	—	—	—	semi-final —
44	31	Life's a Pitch	608		19	963	—	—	—	semi-final —

^{a} SpinOff, Vocality and Milli Blink quartet qualified and were to compete as contestants number 10, 27, and 38 but withdrew from the competition before it began. Therefore subsequent contestants competed in those places but retain their original contestant numbers.

== 2018 ==
The 2018 competition semifinal was held on October 17, and the final on October 19, at The Dome at America's Center in St. Louis, Missouri. The winners, ClassRing, had obtained second place the previous year and had won the 2014 Rising Star competition. Second place was won by Viva! who had qualified with a record score of 715.

St. Louis, Missouri (2018)[semifinal & final Official results]
Place	Region	Contestant	Regional		Semi-final		Final			Competition video availability: Semi-finals Finals
Place	Region	Contestant	Score	Summary	Order of appearance	Score	Order of appearance	Score	Grand total	Competition video availability: Semi-finals Finals
1	5	ClassRing	^{[pre-qualified]}		20	1382	2	1387	2769	semi-final final
2	9	Viva!	715		23	1385	10	1382	2767	semi-final final
3	25	TITANIUM	^{[pre-qualified]}		42	1378	3	1322	2700	semi-final final
4	9	Windsor	^{[pre-qualified]}		30	1338	9	1345	2683	semi-final final
5	4	Tenacious	^{[pre-qualified]}		33	1341	8	1271	2612	semi-final final
6	16	Spritzer	^{[pre-qualified]}		45^{[a]}	1350	6	1251	2601	semi-final final
7	4	Glamour	^{[pre-qualified]}		27	1320	4	1273	2593	semi-final final
8	13	Renegade	^{[pre-qualified]}		6	1342	7	1240	2582	semi-final final
9	10	The Ladies	646		21	1302	1	1261	2563	semi-final final
10	6	Sparkle!	618		19	1290	5	1181	2471	semi-final final
11	32	Milli Blink	664		46	1287	—	—	—	semi-final —
12	5	Pizzazz!	^{[pre-qualified]}		1	1248	—	—	—	semi-final —
13	31	Fortuity	641		3^{[a]}	1234	—	—	—	semi-final —
14	13	PrimeTime	^{[pre-qualified]}		12	1219	—	—	—	semi-final —
15	14	Up All Night	609		17^{[a]}	1204	—	—	—	semi-final —
16	1	Voce	^{[pre-qualified]}		43	1200	—	—	—	semi-final —
17	5	Take 4	642		5	1195	—	—	—	semi-final —
18	12	Ditto	630		47	1188	—	—	—	semi-final —
19	4	Infinity	606		24	1187	—	—	—	semi-final —
20	21	C'est la vie	643		31	1181	—	—	—	semi-final —
21	34	Debacle	596		40^{[a]}	1178	—	—	—	semi-final —
22	19	Sound Design	618		28	1172	—	—	—	semi-final —
23	35	Fire and Ice	593		22	1166	—	—	—	semi-final —
24	32 ^{[wild]}	Gig-a-bite	650		48	1159	—	—	—	semi-final —
25	25	Couture	631		29	1149	—	—	—	semi-final —
26	17 ^{[wild]}	Surefire	615		4	1149	—	—	—	semi-final —
27	17	Wicked	622		15^{[a]}	1148	—	—	—	semi-final —
28	19	Famous Janes	^{[pre-qualified]}		8	1146	—	—	—	semi-final —
29	1	Saffron	637		25	1141	—	—	—	semi-final —
30	8	Ruby Blue	619		13	1130	—	—	—	semi-final —
31	3	Prism	606		34	1129	—	—	—	semi-final —
32	32 ^{[wild]}	Beyond	615		26	1126	—	—	—	semi-final —
33	16	SoundByte	593		41	1105	—	—	—	semi-final —
34	10 ^{[wild]}	Essence	616		11	1100	—	—	—	semi-final —
35	11	Troubador	596		38	1092	—	—	—	semi-final —
36	8 ^{[wild]}	Vintage	610		18	1089	—	—	—	semi-final —
37	26	Uptown Suite!	614		37^{[a]}	1089	—	—	—	semi-final —
38	2	The Vibe	633		10	1081	—	—	—	semi-final —
39	15	Just 4 (Kicks)	607		32	1076	—	—	—	semi-final —
40	13	LiftOff!	630		35	1074	—	—	—	semi-final —
41	13 ^{[wild]}	Brilliance!	615		7	1067	—	—	—	semi-final —
42	17 ^{[wild]}	Intrinsic	610		9	1017	—	—	—	semi-final —

^{a} Neon Lights, Boston Accent, Glow, Finesse, GQ, and Legacy quartet qualified and were to compete as contestants number 2, 14, 16, 36, 39, and 44 but withdrew from the competition before it began. Therefore subsequent contestants competed in those places but retain their original contestant numbers.

== 2019 ==
The 2019 competition will take place in September at the Smoothie King Center, New Orleans.

== Sources ==
- Sweet Adelines International homepage
  - "Competition Handbook" (PDF). Sweet Adelines International. 2015. Archived (PDF) from the original on 27 January 2015.
- Barbershophistory.com homepage
  - historical quartet results
  - competition records
- Sweet Adelines Scores Yahoo! Group [registration required]
