= Diablo Vista Chorus =

Women's barbershop chorus

- Choir
- Origin: Walnut Creek, California, USA
- Founded: 1966
- Genre: a cappella, barbershop
- Director: Caitlin Castelino
- Affiliation: Sweet Adelines International
- Website: diablovistachorus.com

Diablo Vista Chorus (DVC) is an women's a cappella singing group, based in the "East Bay" of the San Francisco Bay area. DVC is a chapter of Sweet Adelines International, one of the world's largest singing organization for women, with over 21,000 members worldwide. DVC primarily performs four-part-harmony works, often in what is traditionally called "barbershop" style.

== History ==
Founded in 1966, DVC averaged 35–45 members throughout the 1990s and 2000s. As of 2019, the chorus has about 70 members.

DVC is directed by Caitlin Castelino, a member of the 2014 international champion quartet LoveNotes and thus a Queen of Harmony".

== Competitions ==
The chorus competes each year at the "regional" level of Sweet Adelines. SAI Region 12, Pacific Shores Region, covers northern California, northern Nevada, and southern Oregon. Regional competition is limited to songs in the barbershop style.

Sweet Adelines choruses that score high enough in their region qualify for international competition in the following year. Thus a spring 2022 regional win earns an autumn 2023 international appearance. (Quartets go to international in the same year as their regional competition.)

=== International Competition 2019 ===
At the regional competition in 2018, DVC finished first as a "midsize" chorus (the AA division) and third overall, and they scored high enough to qualify for Sweet Adelines' international competition in that division.

As a result, in September 2019, DVC went to New Orleans for the 73rd SAI convention, and there won the Harmony Classic competition for their division.

=== International Competition 2023 ===
Due to covid-19 concerns, Region 12's 2022 competition was conducted through video performances by the choruses and quartets at several designated filming locations. Diablo Vista finished first overall out of nine competing choruses, thereby qualifying for international competition.

As a result, in October/November 2023, DVC went to Louisville, Kentucky, for the 75th SAI convention. This was the first time DVC had ever finished first in region and first time they had qualified for international in the top division.

On 1 November 2023, DVC finished in the top ten in the chorus semi-finals (out of 33 competing choruses), qualifying for the finals two days later. DVC then scored 8th in the chorus finals.

== Performances ==
DVC produces their own shows, at least annually, where the chorus can perform a wider range of styles including pop, show tunes, jazz, and even country. These shows often include guest acts such as a cappella quartets.

The chorus has sung the national anthem at an Oakland A's game annually for several years. Chorus members often sing at local events such as festivals, holiday parties, and senior facilities.
