= Sweet Adelines International competition =

Annual women's barbershop singing competition

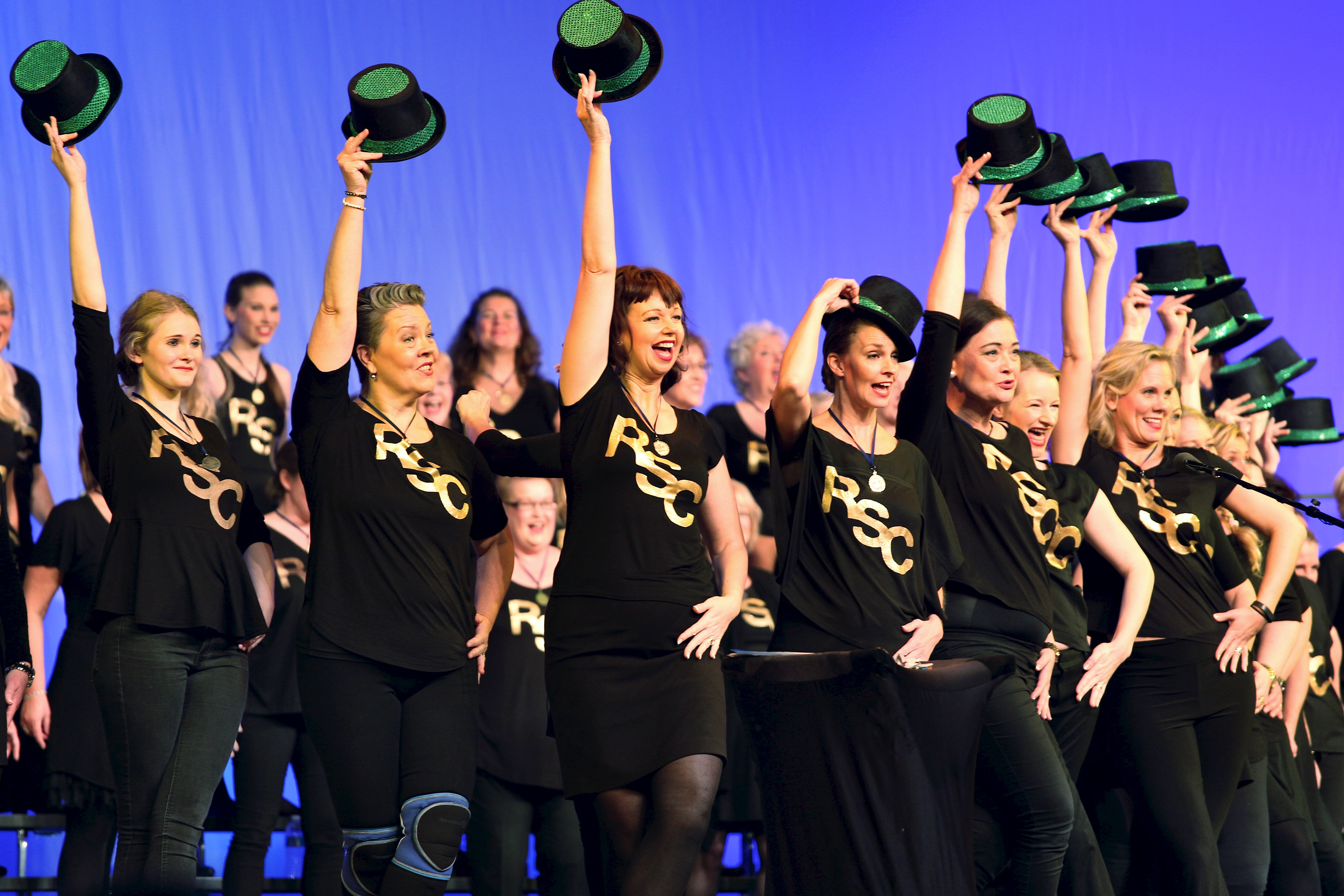
Rönninge Show, performing as reigning champions in 2014

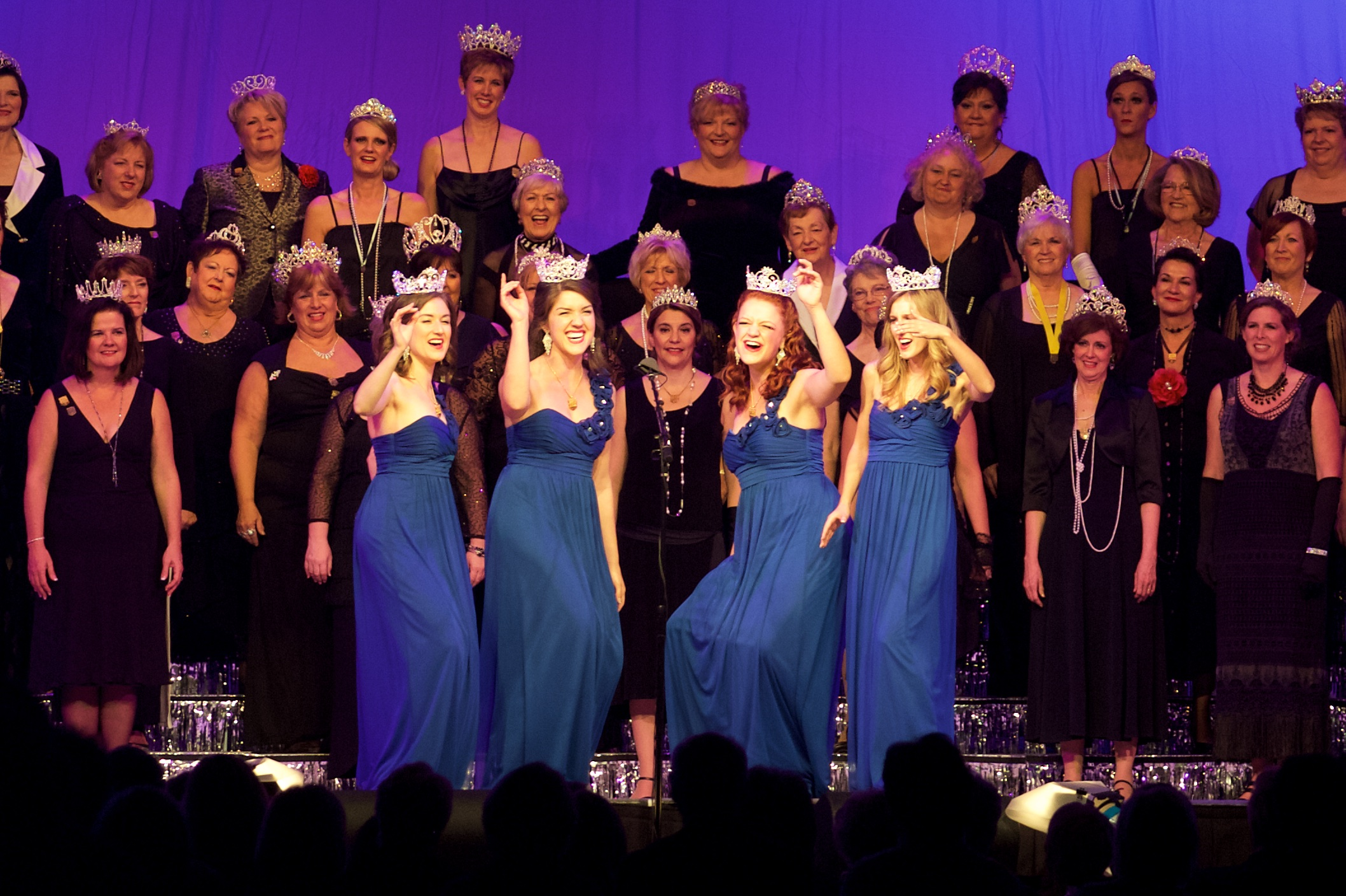
LoveNotes quartet performing as reigning "queens of harmony" in 2014

The Sweet Adelines International Competitions are the annual global championships for women's barbershop harmony a cappella singing – in quartets and choruses – for members of Sweet Adelines International (SAI) and have been held annually between September and November since 1947. They are now the largest women's singing competition in the world with over 8000 participants at the 2014 convention. There are two competitions for choruses (the international championships and the "Harmony Classic" for smaller choruses), and two competitions for quartets (the international championships and the "Rising Star" for young singers). Currently, the first three of these competitions are held together and form the Sweet Adelines International Convention. Over the course of competition history, the most successful chorus has been Melodeers Chorus from Chicago with seven championship titles, and the most successful quartet singer was Connie Noble who won with four separate quartets. Lustre Quartet from Baltimore holds the record for highest quartet score, and Rönninge Show Chorus from Stockholm for highest ever chorus score.

The women stand up, let their arms fall to their sides, and then Patsy reaches into her pocket and places a small pitch tuner to her mouth. A very impressive wall of sound emanates from the four women, who start singing "The Joint Is Jumping"... [They] explain that they're trying to raise money for their first trip to the Sweet Adelines Convention and Competition...the Sweet Adelines is an organisation for promoting women's barbershop singing groups that's been around since the 1940s. "Every year they have a big convention and competition somewhere. It's huge," Jane says. "We've been singing together for years, but we finally decided to take a shot at it."

— Joseph Blum, Bedtime Stories: A Novel of Cinematic Wanderlust

== History ==
The first convention was held in Tulsa, Oklahoma in 1947 for quartets – two years after the foundation of the first Sweet Adelines Inc. chapter in the city. The competition was expanded to include choruses in 1973 and in 2000 the Harmony Classic competition for small and medium-sized choruses was introduced. Originally, Harmony Classic was held independently but since 2009 all three are now hosted together and run over the course of the convention week. A fourth event, the "Rising Star" competition, was introduced in 1999 for quartets whose members are 25 years old or younger. It was also held as part of convention from 2009 until 2012 but due to scheduling and cost constraints is now held independently again. Many non-competitive performances are also held during convention week, including by the previous year's chorus and quartet champions.

The convention is usually held in a city in the continental United States but has thrice been held internationally (England 1977, Canada 1962, 2007) and four times in Hawaii (1969, 1987, 2008, 2013). A "spectacular fifty-year anniversary celebration" was held in New Orleans during the 1995 convention and the competition was to be held there a decade later in 2005, but was moved due to Hurricane Katrina. From 2015 to 2017, the city of Las Vegas hosted the convention – the first time that the event has stayed in the same location for more than one year. The 2020 "75th Diamond Anniversary" convention is expected to be the first use of the newly renovated Kentucky International Convention Center in Louisville, Kentucky – expecting to draw 10,000 attendees. Since 2004, the competition has been livestreamed over the internet as a popular donation-funded webcast, operated by an in-house media production team.

In recent years, the formal events of convention week proceed as follows:

Tuesday	Wednesday	Thursday	Friday	Saturday
Harmony Classic	Quartet semi-finals	Chorus semi-finals	Quartet Finals	Chorus finals

== Qualifying ==
The competitions held during international convention each have a different qualification processes:

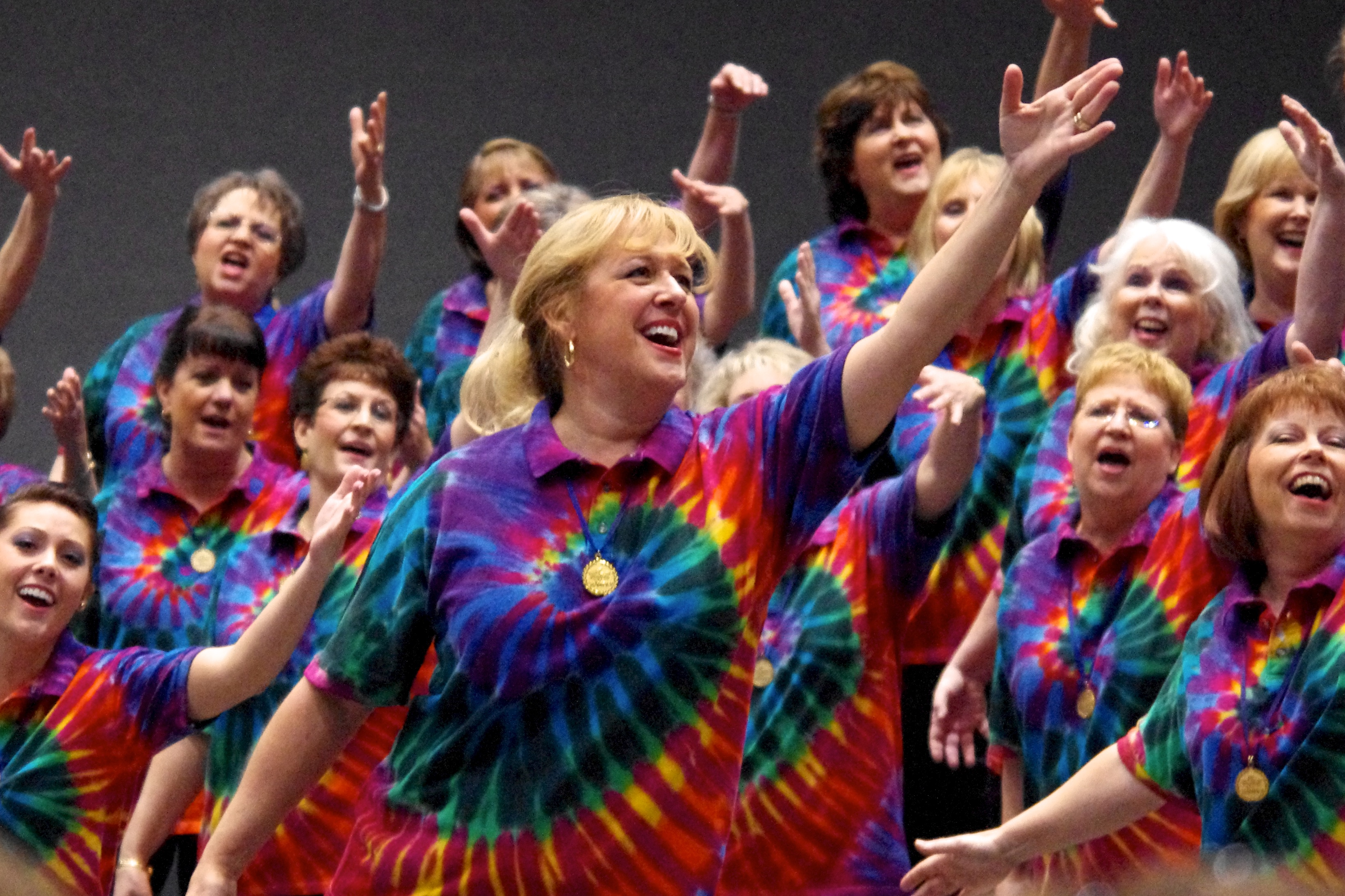
Reigning chorus champions Scottsdale performing in 2011, wearing their 2010 championship medals

For choruses, the highest scoring chorus of each SAI regional competition qualifies directly for the following year's SAI international competition semi-final. For example, the winner of a regional competition in 2014 is granted entry as their region's representative to the 2015 competition. If that chorus cannot compete, the second-placed chorus is offered the place. There are 28 active regions numbered 1–35 (some have been merged with others over time) although a region is not obliged to hold a regional competition every year. A chorus may not compete in a regional competition in the year that they are also qualified to compete in the international competition. This rule ensures that one chorus does not monopolise their region's attendance to the international competition. In addition to the direct-qualifying places, since 2002 "wildcard" places are awarded to the highest-scoring second-placed choruses across all regional competitions making it possible for a region to have two representatives at internationals in one year. Initially four wildcard places were made available, subsequently increased to 10. Wildcards ensures that a high scoring chorus is not unfairly excluded from international competition due to being in a highly competitive region.

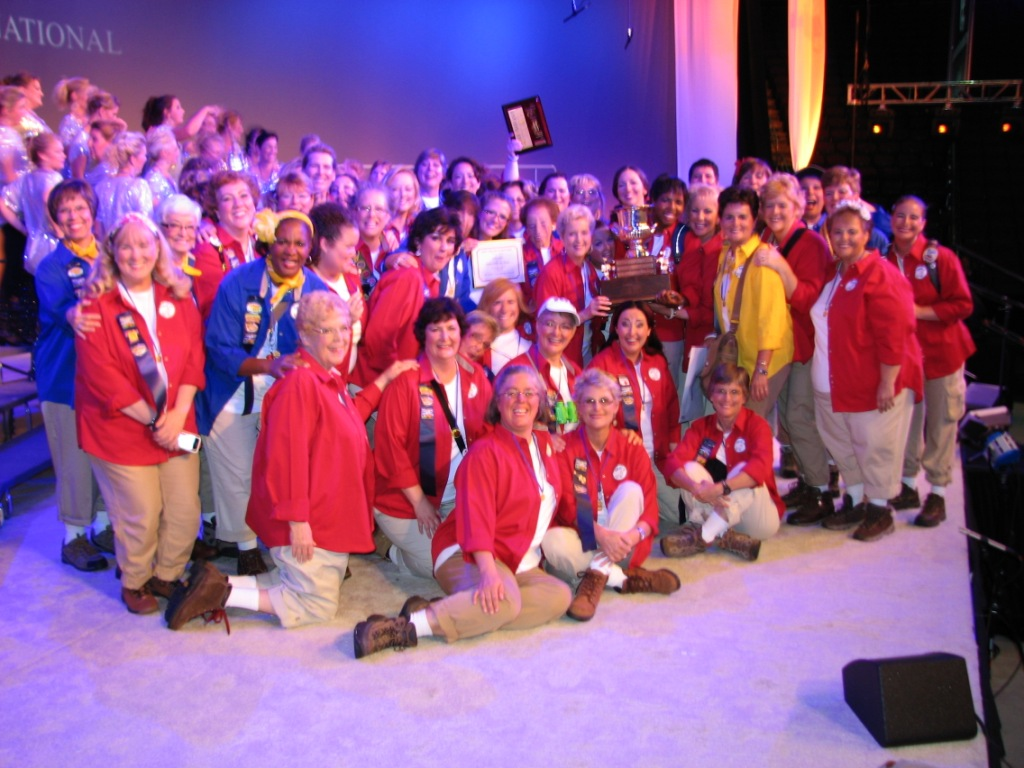
Metro Nashville Chorus having just become the "Mid-Size Chorus" (Division AA) Harmony Classic champions in Houston, 2011

Qualification for the Harmony Classic competition happens as part of the regional chorus competition. The five highest-scoring small (division A, fewer than 30 singers) and midsize (division, AA 31–60 singers) choruses across all regional competitions qualify directly for the Harmony Classic of the following year. With five choruses in each of the two divisions (A & AA) a total of 10 choruses compete in this competition each year. Only one chorus from a region may compete in each of the divisions and a chorus may not compete in the same division again two years in a row. Furthermore, a chorus may not compete in both the main competition and also the Harmony Classic at the same year. A chorus may potentially qualify for both the main chorus competition and the Harmony Classic, but are only permitted to compete in one, thereby making a space available for the next highest qualifier to take their place at the other competition.

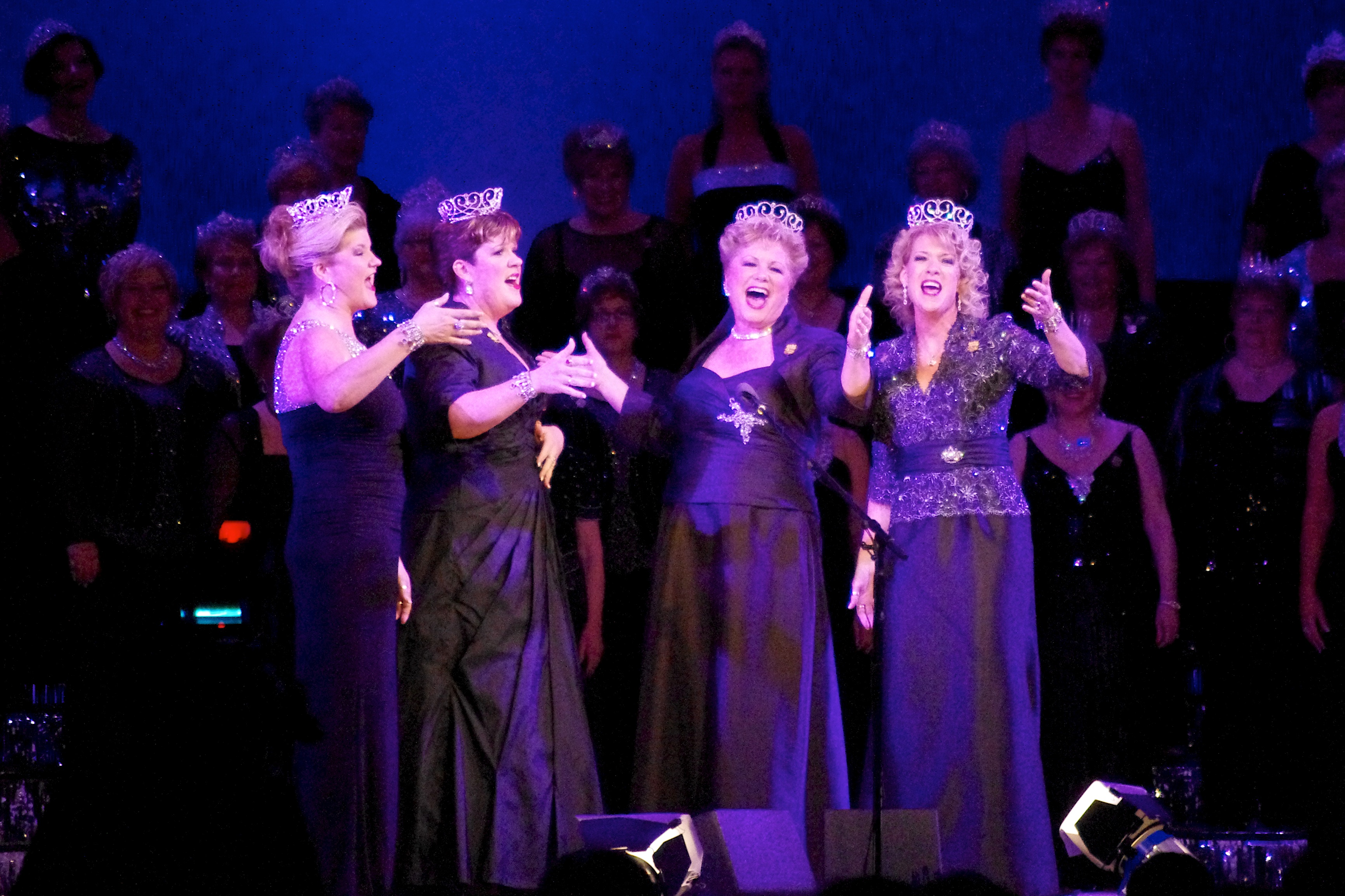
Reigning quartet champions MAXX Factor performing in 2011, wearing their 2010 championship crowns. Note, past "queens" in the background with their own, different, crown styles

For quartets, qualification proceeds in much the same manner as for choruses – with regional winners and wildcard places. The regional qualification process happens in the same calendar year as the international competition (not the preceding year as is the case with choruses). Furthermore, quartets that obtain a ranking of 2nd to 15th place at the previous year's international competition are considered to have pre-qualified for the following international competition and are offered a direct place in the semi-final if they wish without the requirement to compete in their regional competition. This means that the total number of competing quartets is higher than the chorus competition.

A chorus may win many international competitions or Harmony Classic competitions over the years, but may not compete at the international level two years in a row. In contrast, a quartet may compete at the international competition many times in succession, but must retire from all SAI quartet competitions if it wins, although the quartet may participate in a regional competition for evaluation. Quartets performing for evaluation receive a scoresheet with comments and grade, but are not awarded a score and are not eligible for awards.

There is no formal qualification process for the international Rising Star competition; rather, an eligible quartet registers their interest. A quartet may compete at the Rising Star competition several years in succession, provided all its members remain 25 years old or younger, but winning quartets may not compete in the Rising Star competition again.

== Scoring ==
Both choruses and quartets are judged according to four categories:

- Sound: judging mastery of vocal skills, tuning of chords, delivery of vowels with matched resonance, "Barbershop balance", vocal lines, artistry and finesse.
- Music: judging creative arrangement of a barbershop style song, timing of chords, and execution of interpretive plan.
- Expression: judging matched open vowels, diction, execution of interpretive plan, use of barbershop style and vocal drama, and emotional communication.
- Visual Communication (previously Showmanship): judging command of the stage, theatrical skill and projection of character, audience captivation, performance energy, and the visual plan.

For all categories, judges are also scoring for whether "mastery of vocal skills [is] demonstrated" and whether the "performance transcends technique".

In scoring both the semi-final and the final, penalties may be applied for a variety of rules including time-limits, not singing competition-songs in American English, the use of musical instruments, singing religious or patriotic songs and "misconduct".

In regional competitions, there is one round of competition and each category is scored by one judge. Therefore,:

Regional competition: 4 categories x 1 judge each x 2 songs, maximum 100 points per judge = maximum possible 800 points.

At International competition, the number of judges for each category is doubled (making eight judges in total). Consequently, the maximum possible score in each round of international competition is also doubled to 1600.

Until 1985, there were three rounds of competition for quartets (quarter-final for all qualifiers, semi-final for the top 20, and final for the top 10) and only one round of competition for choruses (the final). Therefore, the perfect score was 4800 for a quartet and 1600 for a chorus. From 1985 the two competitions' structures were standardised to the semi-final/final format (semi-final for all qualifiers, final for the top 5) This set the new perfect score for both choruses and quartets at 3200. Two years later in 1987, a maximum of 80 "bonus points" were added in the final round (10 per judge) for scoring the performance "package" in both the quartet and chorus competitions, raising the maximum score to 3280. Two years after that in 1989, the quartet competition re-introduced the quarter-final with a reduced score (20 per judge) but retaining the bonus points system in the final. This increased the quartet perfect score to 3440 while the chorus competition continued without change. In 1998 the two systems were standardised again with the quartet competition returning to the format introduced in 1987, but with the size of the final round for choruses and quartets doubled to 10 contestants. Following a further rule change, from the 2015 competition the "bonus points" were removed, reducing the perfect score back to the 1985 standard of 3200.

Chorus and quartet competition scoring system changes
Era	Round	Choruses	Quartets
Pre-1985	Quarter-final	–	1600 (4 categories x 2 judges each x 2 songs, 100 points per judge)
Pre-1985	Semi-final	–	1600 (same process as QF)
Pre-1985	Final	1600 (4 categories x 2 judges each x 2 songs, 100 points per judge)	1600 (same process as QF)
Pre-1985	Perfect score	1600	4800 (combined total of QF, SF, and F rounds)
1985–1986	Semi-final	1600 (4 categories x 2 judges each x 2 songs, 100 points per judge)	
1985–1986	Final	1680 (Same process as SF)	
1985–1986	Perfect score	3200 (combined total of SF and F rounds)	
1987–1988	Semi-final	1600 (4 categories x 2 judges each x 2 songs, 100 points per judge)	
1987–1988	Final	1680 (Same process as SF + up to 10 "bonus" points for the package from each of the 8 judges)	
1987–1988	Perfect score	3280 (combined total of SF and F rounds)	
1989–1997	Quarter-final	–	160 (4 categories x 2 judges each x 2 songs, 10 points per judge)
1989–1997	Semi-final	1600 (4 categories x 2 judges each x 2 songs, 100 points per judge)	
1989–1997	Final	1680 (Same process as SF + up to 10 "bonus" points for the package from each of the 8 judges)	
1989–1997	Perfect score	3280 (combined total of SF and F rounds)	3440 (combined total of QF, SF and F rounds)
1998–2014	Semi-final	1600 (4 categories x 2 judges each x 2 songs, 100 points per judge)	
1998–2014	Final	1680 (Same process as SF + up to 10 "bonus" points for the package from each of the 8 judges)	
1998–2014	Perfect score	3280 (combined total of SF and F rounds)	
2015 onward	Semi-final	1600 (4 categories x 2 judges each x 2 songs, 100 points per judge)	
2015 onward	Final	1600 (4 categories x 2 judges each x [1 song + 1 performance package], 100 points per judge)	
2015 onward	Perfect score	3200 (combined total of SF and F rounds)	

In the regional and semi-final competitions, each contestant must perform two songs – normally an "up-tune" and a ballad – in the order of their choice. The combined times of both songs must be no longer than 7 minutes. In the final round of competition, choruses and quartets are allowed between 12 and 15 minutes to perform. Rather than a strict two-song performance, choruses must perform a "package" of approximately 4 songs with a narrative or theme tying the package together and spoken interludes (known as "emcee material"). In the chorus competition props, costume changes, medley/mashup choral arrangements, and elaborate (even gymnastic) choreography moves are also common. As a consolation prize, the 11th ranked chorus or quartet is invited to perform their own package at the beginning of the final round as the "mic[rophone] testers". As with the semi-finals, the final-round performance order of appearance is randomly allocated.

Within the finals package, from 1985 until 2014, quartets and choruses were still expected to perform two "competition songs" (one "up-tune" and one ballad) which would be scored in the same manner as the semi-finals as well as their package (which would attract potential "bonus points"). From 2015, quartets and choruses are only required to perform one formally judged competition song in the finals (their choice of either an "up-tune" or a ballad), with the remainder of the score judging their finals package as a whole.

The score sheet itself contains lengthy hand written notes by each of the judges giving the contestant information on what the judges heard (and saw) to justify their score and also ways to improve. The visual layout of the scorecards have changed from year to year, but an example of how of a performer's semi-final scorecard from international competition appears is as follows (equally applicable to a chorus or quartet):

Example international semi-final scorecard
C #	Contestant name and songs	#		Sound			Music			Expression			Showmanship			Pty	Total	Place
7	Example Chorus	73		Song 1	Song 2		Song 1	Song 2		Song 1	Song 2		Song 1	Song 2				
	"Song 1"		Judge 1	77	75	152	76	78	154	78	79	157	75	77	152			
	"Song 2"		Judge 2	76	78	154	78	78	156	78	80	158	76	78	154			
						306			310			315			306	0	1237	15

C# refers to "contestant number" i.e. the order of appearance.

# refers to "number [on stage]" i.e. the size of the chorus, relevant for calculating the "harmony achievement" award.

Pty refers to "penalty" i.e. the number of points deducted, if any.

Place refers to the ranking of the chorus compared to all other competitors' total scores.

Note that because the semi-final and final scores are cumulative, it can occur that the highest scoring chorus in the final does not win the championship because another chorus had a higher cumulative score. Semi-final scores are given to all choruses after the performance except for the top-10 choruses who qualified for the final competition. Their semi-final (and therefore the semi-final rankings) are kept secret until after the end of the competition.

Because of the complexity of the scoring system, to more easily group competitive performances score ranges are often referred to by a "performance level" – starting at the perfect score (represented by A+) and concluding at F. Due to the differing number of judges (and therefore differing scores) between regional and international competition the "level" system allows for easier comparison. These ranges are as follows:

Performance level	Score per category	Regional score	International score
A+	188–200	752–800	1504–1600
A	172–187	688–751	1376–1503
A-	160–171	640–687	1280–1375
B+	148–159	592–639	1184–1279
B	132–147	528–591	1056–1183
B-	120–131	480–527	960–1055
C+	108–119	432–479	864–959
C	92–107	368–431	736–863
C-	80–91	320–367	640–735
D+	68–79	272–319	544–639
D	52–69	208–271	416–543
D-	40–51	160–207	320–415
F	0–39	0–159	0–319

== Awards ==
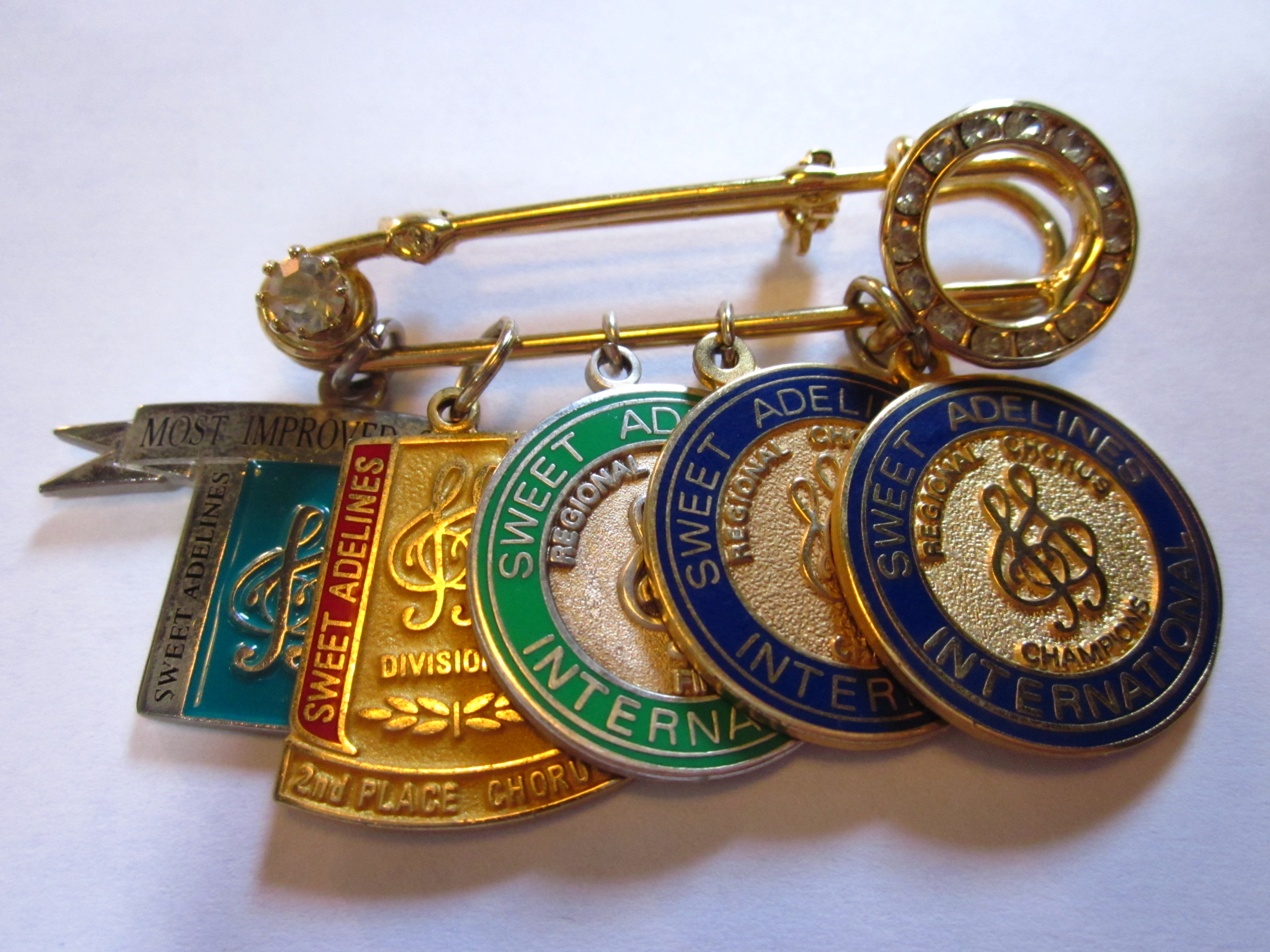
A collection of medals won at SAI regional chorus competitions. From left to right: "most improved" chorus, 2nd place "Division A", 5th place, and two "Champion" medals

The singers of the top-10 placed choruses and quartets in the main competitions are awarded medals with a designated color. They are designated the International Champion Chorus/Quartet for the next calendar year. As the current title holders, the winners are permitted to wear these medals around their neck on a ribbon of the same color until the following year's competition. At this point they must be removed from the colored ribbon. Longstanding members of Sweet Adelines International may end up earning many awards at both regional and international competitions. Customarily these are worn as a group in a manner similar to military service ribbons, often attached to the chest with a brooch-like clasp.

In addition, international quartet champions are awarded a tiara or crown each – every year of a different design – and are proclaimed "Queens of Harmony", this title having been in use since at least 1960. They are entitled to wear their crown at any future SAI event, even when they are not the current champions. However, they are not allowed to compete as that quartet again. The association of past quartet winners is known as the "Coronet Club".

Ribbon color
Competition	1st	2nd	3rd	4th	5th	Achievement
Chorus Finals	blue	red	white	yellow	green	violet
Quartet Finals	blue	red	white	yellow	green	
Rising Star	blue	red	white			
Harmony Classic division A	deep purple	medium purple	pale purple			
Harmony Classic division AA	hot pink	medium pink	pale pink			

In the chorus competition, in addition to the placings, the "Harmony Achievement award" has been presented since 1991. This recognises the chorus that achieved the highest score, despite having relatively fewer singers on stage. The formula for calculating the largest chorus eligible for the award is: "Total number of performers on stage at any time, including directors, divided by the number of contestants, multiplied by 80%".

Certified directors of any chorus which attains more than 600 points at regional competition (or 1200 points at international, excluding bonus points) are entitled to be called a "master director" or, for those whose chorus achieves more than 700 (1400 at international), "master director 700".

== Chorus competition ==
=== Champions ===
Until 1984, there was only one round of competition; from 1985, there are two round which increases the total score. Equally, from 2015 no "bonus points" are awarded in the final round, reducing the total score. The % column accounts for this change in maximum score to allow for comparison between years with different scoring systems. The Harmony Achievement award was introduced in 1991.

The list of champion choruses and related information is as follows. Note, some choruses have changed region in the years after their winning the competition. The region listed is the region that the chorus represented that year.

Year	Competition location	Champion	Director	Region	Score	%	Second place	Third place	Harmony Achievement	Competition summary
1973	Washington, D.C.	Racine	Jarmela Speta	22	1328	83.0%	Dundalk	Cedar Rhapsody^{[a]}		missing
1974	Milwaukee, Wisconsin	Gem City	Jean Pyles	4	1326	82.9%	Scottsdale	Mission Valley		missing
1975	Seattle, Washington	San Diego	Marvin Yerkey	21	1249	78.1%	St. Joseph^{[a]}	Dundalk		missing
1976	Cincinnati, Ohio	Mission Valley	Gloria Sandstrom	12	1268	79.3%	Seven Hills^{[a]}	Melodeers		missing
1977	London, England	Gem City	Jean Barford	4	1359	84.9%	Racine	Scottsdale		missing
1978	Los Angeles, California	Island Hills	Estelle Grau	15	1298	81.1%	San Diego	Verdugo Hills		missing
1979	St. Louis, Missouri	Ramapo Valley^{[a]}	Renee Craig	15	1254	78.4%	St. Joseph^{[a]}	Scottsdale		
1980	Atlanta, Georgia	High Country	Sylvia Alsbury	8	1395	87.2%	Gem City	Verdugo Hills		missing
1981	Phoenix, Arizona	Seven Hills^{[a]}	Tom Gentil	4	1244	77.8%	Valley Forge	Mission Viejo		
1982	Minneapolis, Minnesota	Gem City	Jean Barford	4	1342	83.9%	Ramapo Valley^{[a]}	Scottsdale		
1983	Detroit, Michigan	Valley Forge	Jan Muck	15	1279	79.9%	City of Lakes	High Country		
1984	Las Vegas, Nevada	Scottsdale	Bev Sellers	21	1309	81.8%	Ramapo Valley^{[a]}	Lakeside^{[a]}		
1985^{[b]}	Kansas City, Missouri	Gem City	Jean Barford	4	2698	84.3%	City of Lakes	High Country		
1986	Philadelphia, Pennsylvania	Ramapo Valley^{[a]}	Renee Craig	15	2701	84.4%	Vienna-Falls	Greater Dallas^{[a]}		
1987	Honolulu, Hawaii	High Country	Sharon Babb & Julie Haller	8	2646	80.7%	Scottsdale	Rich-Tone		
1988	Houston, Texas	Vienna-Falls	Betty Tracy	14	2675	81.6%	Gem City	Valley Forge		
1989	Miami Beach, Florida	Scottsdale	Bev Sellers	21	2715	82.8%	Rich-Tone	City of Lakes		
1990	Salt Lake City, Utah	Ramapo Valley	Renee Craig	15	2676	88.6%	Seven Hills^{[a]}	Kansas City		
1991	San Antonio, Texas	Gem City	Jean Barford	4	2679	81.6%	San Diego	Lakeside^{[a]}	Cedar Rhapsody^{[a]}	
1992	Baltimore, Maryland	Rich-Tone	Dale Syverson	25	2884	87.9%	City of Lakes	Melodeers	Song of Atlanta	
1993	Indianapolis, Indiana	Toast of Tampa Show	Randy Loos	9	2714	82.7%	Kansas City	Scottsdale	Pearls of the Sound	
1994	Reno, Nevada	Melodeers	Jim Arns	3	2834	86.4%	Gem City	Houston Horizon	St. Joseph	
1995	New Orleans, Louisiana	Rich-Tone	Dale Syverson	25	2809	85.6%	Rönninge Show	Scottsdale	Perth Harmony	
1996	Ft. Lauderdale, Florida	North Metro	June Dale	16	2822	86.0%	Gem City	Houston Horizon	Midwest Crossroads	
1997	Salt Lake City, Utah	Melodeers	Jim Arns	3	2833	86.4%	San Diego	Kansas City	Georgia Harmony	
1998	Nashville, Tennessee	Rich-Tone	Dale Syverson	25	2805	85.5%	City of Lakes	Scottsdale	Lions Gate	
1999	Atlanta, Georgia	North Metro	June Dale	16	2904	88.5%	Sunlight	San Diego	Pride of Baltimore	
2000	Orlando, Florida	Melodeers	Jim Arns	3	2931	89.4%	Scottsdale	Pacific Sound	Top of the Rock	
2001	Portland, Oregon	San Diego	Kim Hulbert	21	2907	88.6%	Rich-Tone	Pride of Baltimore	Rönninge Show	
2002	Nashville, Tennessee	North Metro	June Dale	16	2986	91.0%	Gem City	Scottsdale	Ramapo Valley	
2003	Phoenix, Arizona	Melodeers	Jim Arns	3	2969	90.5%	Pride of Baltimore	Rich-Tone	Royal River	
2004	Indianapolis, Indiana	Harborlites	Pam Pieson	21	2919	89.0%	Skyline	Gem City	St. Louis Harmony	
2005	Detroit, Michigan	Scottsdale	Lori Lyford	21	2899	88.4%	Pride of Baltimore	Kansas City	Greater Nassau	
2006	Las Vegas, Nevada	Rich-Tone	Dale Syverson	25	2942	89.7%	Melodeers	North Metro	OK City	
2007	Calgary, Alberta, Canada	Harborlites	Pam Pieson	21	2985	91.0%	Pride of Baltimore	Lions Gate	Spirit of Detroit	
2008	Honolulu, Hawaii	Melodeers	Jim Arns	3	3023	92.2%	Scottsdale	Skyline	St. Louis Harmony	
2009	Nashville, Tennessee	Rich-Tone	Dale Syverson	25	3054	93.1%	Lions Gate	Pride Of Kentucky	Harbor City Music Company	
2010	Seattle, Washington	Scottsdale	Lori Lyford	21	3077	93.8%	Harborlites	North Metro	Stockholm City Voices	
2011	Houston, Texas	Melodeers	Jim Arns	3	3091	94.2%	Rönninge Show	Lions Gate	Harbor City Music Company	
2012	Denver, Colorado	North Metro	June Dale	16	3058	93.2%	Rich-Tone	Harborlites	Metro Nashville	
2013	Honolulu, Hawaii	Rönninge Show	Anna Alvring & Britt-Heléne Bonnedahl	32	3138	95.7%	Scottsdale	Toast of Tampa Show	Greater Nassau	
2014	Baltimore, Maryland	Melodeers	Jim Arns	3	3129	95.4%	Rich-Tone	Harborlites	Metro Nashville	
2015^{[c]}	Las Vegas, Nevada	Scottsdale	Lori Lyford	21	3044	95.1%	North Metro	Toast of Tampa Show	Stockholm City Voices	
2016	Las Vegas, Nevada	Rönninge Show	Anna Alvring & Britt-Heléne Bonnedahl	32	3098	96.8%	Rich-Tone	Harborlites	Metro Nashville	
2017	Las Vegas, Nevada	North Metro	Erin Howden	16	2959	92.5%	Lions Gate	Melodeers	Stockholm City Voices	
2018	St. Louis, Missouri	Scottsdale	Lori Lyford	21	2982	93.2%	Harborlites	Rich-Tone	Metro Nashville	
2019	New Orleans, Louisiana	Rönninge Show	Anna Alvring & Britt-Heléne Bonnedahl	32	3061	95.7%	Lions Gate	Melodeers	Stockholm City Voices	
2020– 2021	No contest due to COVID-19 pandemic									
2022	Phoenix, Arizona	Rich-Tone	Dale Syverson	25	2929	91.5%	Skyline	Song of Atlanta	Metro Nashville	
2023	Louisville, Kentucky	Lions Gate	Sandy Marron	26	3019	94.3%	Scottsdale	Harbor City Music Company	Vocal Standard	
2024	Kansas City, Missouri	North Metro	Erin Howden	16	3018	94.3%	Song of Atlanta	Skyline	The Woodlands Show	
2025	Columbus, Ohio	Toast of Tampa Show	Tony De Rosa	9	2988	93.4%	Scottsdale	Rich-Tone	Millennium Magic	
2026	Columbus, Ohio	Song of Atlanta	Becki Hine	14	3061	95.7%	Harborlites	Skyline	Westcoast Harmony	[45]

^{a} Chorus is now defunct, has merged with another chorus, or has changed name.

^{b} Until 1985, only round of competition was held. As a result, the grand-total score of the winner for earlier years is lower than competitions from 1985-onwards where two rounds of scores (semi-final and final) make up the grand total. For full details of scoring changes see the scoring section above. Direct comparisons of scores in different eras are possible using the % column.

^{c} Until 2015, 10 bonus points were available in the final round per-song per-judge (80 points in total). Removing these reduced the possible grand total from 3280 to 3200. Direct comparisons of scores in different eras are possible using the % column.

=== Results by year ===
Chorus competition
1970s	Washington D.C. 1973 • Milwaukee 1974 • Seattle 1975 • Cincinnati 1976 • London 1977 • Los Angeles 1978 • St. Louis 1979
1980s	Atlanta 1980 • Phoenix 1981 • Minneapolis 1982 • Detroit 1983 • Las Vegas 1984 • Kansas City 1985 • Philadelphia 1986 • Honolulu 1987 • Houston 1988 • Miami Beach 1989
1990s	Salt Lake City 1990 • San Antonio 1991 • Baltimore 1992 • Indianapolis 1993 • Reno 1994 • New Orleans 1995 • Fort Lauderdale 1996 • Salt Lake City 1997 • Nashville 1998 • Atlanta 1999
2000s	Orlando 2000 • Portland 2001 • Nashville 2002 • Phoenix 2003 • Indianapolis 2004 • Detroit 2005 • Las Vegas 2006 • Calgary 2007 • Honolulu 2008 • Nashville 2009
2010s	Seattle 2010 • Houston 2011 • Denver 2012 • Honolulu 2013 • Baltimore 2014 • Las Vegas 2015 • Las Vegas 2016 • Las Vegas 2017 • St. Louis 2018 • New Orleans 2019
2020s	Not held 2020–2021 • Phoenix 2022 • Louisville 2023 • Kansas City 2024 • Columbus 2025

=== Chorus records ===
==== Most successful choruses ====
The most successful choruses over time as of 2024, are as follows. Choruses are ranked according to the gold first system but can be sorted to rank according to total number of top-three appearances. Some choruses have changed region over time, and each chorus's current region is listed here.

Chorus	Region	Website	Bio	Champion	Second place	Third place	Total top-three
Melodeers	3			7 (1994, 1997, 2000, 2003, 2008, 2011, 2014)	1 (2006)	4 (1976, 1992, 2017, 2019)	12
Scottsdale	21			6 (1984, 1989, 2005, 2010, 2015, 2018)	6 (1974, 1987, 2000, 2013, 2023, 2025)	8 (1977, 1979, 1982, 1993, 1995, 1998, 2002, 2008)	20
Rich-Tone	25			6 (1992, 1995, 1998, 2006, 2009, 2022)	5 (1989, 2001, 2012, 2014, 2016)	4 (1987, 2003, 2018, 2025)	15
North Metro	16			6 (1996, 1999, 2002, 2012, 2017, 2024)	2 (2008, 2015)	2 (2006, 2010)	10
Gem City	4			5 (1974, 1977, 1982, 1985, 1991)	5 (1980, 1988, 1992, 1994, 1996)	1 (2004)	11
Ramapo Valley^{[a]}	15	–		3 (1979, 1986, 1990)	2 (1982, 1984)	–	5
Rönninge Show	32			3 (2013, 2016, 2019)	2 (1995, 2011)	–	5
San Diego	21			2 (1975, 2001)	3 (1978, 1991, 1997)	1 (1999)	6
Harborlites	21			2 (2004, 2007)	2 (2010, 2018)	3 (2012, 2014, 2016)	7
Toast of Tampa Show	9			2 (1993, 2025)	–	2 (2013, 2015)	4
High Country	8	–		2 (1980, 1987)	–	2 (1983, 1985)	4
Lions Gate	26			1 (2023)	3 (2009, 2017, 2019)	2 (2007, 2011)	6
Seven Hills^{[a]}	4	–		1 (1981)	2 (1976, 1990)	–	3
Song of Atlanta	14			1 (2026)	1 (2024)	1 (2022)	3
Valley Forge	15			1 (1983)	1 (1981)	1 (1988)	3
Racine	3			1 (1973)	1 (1977)	–	2
Vienna-Falls	14			1 (1988)	1 (1986)	–	2
Mission Valley	12			1 (1976)	–	1 (1974)	2
Island Hills	15			1 (1978)	–	–	1
City of Lakes	6			–	3 (1983, 1985, 1992)	1 (1989)	4
Pride of Baltimore^{[a]}	19			–	3 (2003, 2005, 2007)	1 (2001)	4
St Joseph Show^{[a]}	5			–	2 (1975, 1979)	–	2
Kansas City	5			–	1 (1993)	3 (1990, 1997, 2005)	4
Dundalk	19			–	1 (1973)	1 (1975)	2
Skyline	8			–	1 (2004, 2022)	1 (2024)	2
Sunlight	32			–	1 (1999)	–	1
Houston Horizon	10			–	–	2 (1994, 1996)	2
Lakeside^{[a]}	13			–	–	2 (1984, 1991)	2
Verdugo Hills	11			–	–	2 (1978, 1980)	2
Cedar Rhapsody^{[a]}	5			–	–	1 (1973)	1
Greater Dallas^{[a]}	10			–	–	1 (1986)	1
Harbor City Music Company	19			–	–	1 (2023)	1
Mission Viejo	21			–	–	1 (1981)	1
Pacific Sound	13	–		–	–	1 (2000)	1
Pride of Kentucky	4			–	–	1 (2009)	1

==== Highest ever regional scores ====
The highest 30 scores ever achieved at any regional competition as of 2018 regional competitions, are as follows.

Rank	Score	Chorus	Region	Year	Competition summary
1	759	Melodeers	3	2016	
2	755	Rönninge Show	32	2018	
3	751	Melodeers	3	2010	
3	751	North Metro	16	2014	
3	751	Toast of Tampa Show	9	2014	
6	749	Rönninge Show	32	2012	
7	748	Melodeers	3	2013	
7	748	Rich-Tone	25	2013	
9	744	Rönninge Show	32	2015	
9	744	Scottsdale	21	2017	
11	741	Melodeers	3	2007	
11	741	Rich-Tone	25	2011	
13	736	Harborlites	21	2009	
13	736	Scottsdale	21	2012	
15	737	Harbor City Music Company	19	2018	
16	732	Scottsdale	21	2014	
16	732	Scioto Valley	4	2016	
18	731	North Metro	16	2007	
18	731	Haborlites	21	2017	
20	729	Haborlites	21	2006	
21	728	North Metro	16	2001	
22	727	North Metro	16	2016	
23	726	Rich-Tone	25	2015	
23	726	Toast of Tampa Show	9	2016	
25	725	Pride of Baltimore	19	2006	
25	725	Rich-Tone	25	2008	
27	724	Scottsdale	21	2007	
27	724	Skyline	8	2017	
29	723	North Metro	1	2009	
30	721	Pride of Portland	13	2015	

==== Highest regional score by region ====
The highest score ever achieved in each individual region's competition as of 2018, are as follows:

Region	Score	Chorus	Year	Competition summary
1	689	Coastline	2008	
2	677	Motor City Blend	2017	
3	759	Melodeers	2016	
4	732	Scioto Valley	2016	
5	660	River Blenders	2003	
6	710	City of Lakes	2017	
7	678	Kansas City	2004	
8	724	Skyline	2017	
9	751	Toast of Tampa Show	2014	
10	687	The Woodlands Show	2017	
11	657	ChannelAire	2009	
12	667	Bay Area Showcase	2016	
13	721	Pride of Portland	2015	
14	686	Song of Atlanta	2017	
15	710	Greater Nassau	2014	
16	751	North Metro	2014	
17	661	Pride of Toledo	2000	
19	737	Harbor City Music Company	2018	
21	744	Scottsdale	2017	
22	640	River City Sound	2013	
23	708	Song of Atlanta	2011	
24	701	Pride of Portland	2013	
25	748	Rich-Tone	2013	
26	716	Lions Gate	2018	
30	no competition held			
31	694	Forth Valley	2016	
32	755	Rönninge Show	2018	
34	662	Endeavour Harmony	2014	
35	685	Christchurch	2015	

=== Harmony Classic ===
==== Champions ====
Before 2009 the Harmony Classic competition was hosted independently from the other SAI competitions, but since 2009 it has been held in parallel, and at the same location.

Eligibility for Division AA (medium) is for choruses with between 31 and 60 singers on stage, while Division A (small) is for those with between 15 and 30 singers. The list of Harmony Classic competition winners is as follows:

Year	Competition location	Division AA champion	Region	Score	Competition summary	Division A champion	Region	Score	Competition summary
2000	San Antonio, Texas	Royal River	1	1275		Prairie Echoes	3	1274	
2001	San Antonio, Texas	Jacksonville Harmony	9	1305		Pearls of the Sound	32	1237	
2002	Greenville, South Carolina	Royal River	1	1276		Prairie Echoes	3	1264	
2003	Greenville, South Carolina	Valley Forge	15	1284		Millennium Magic	1	1169	
2004	Greenville, South Carolina	Columbus	4	1235		Queen City Sound	25	1206	
2005	Greenville, South Carolina	Scioto Valley	4	1262		Women of Note	14	1204	
2006	San Antonio, Texas	Harbor City Music Company	19	1310		Metro Nashville	4	1289	
2007	San Antonio, Texas	Waikato Rivertones	35	1312		Alba Show	32	1293	
2008	San Antonio, Texas	Metro Nashville	4	1303		Stockholm City Voices	32	1328	
2009	Nashville, Tennessee	Scioto Valley	4	1350		Millennium Magic	1	1268	
2010	Seattle, Washington	Harbor City Music Company	19	1344		Queen City Sound	25	1189	
2011	Houston, Texas	Metro Nashville	4	1325		Alba Show	32	1337	
2012	Denver, Colorado	Westcoast Harmony	26	1319		Carolina Harmony	14	1228	
2013	Honolulu, Hawaii	Rhythm of the Rockies	26	1381		Pearls of the Sound	32	1303	
2014	Baltimore, Maryland	City of Gardens	26	1238		Springfield Metro Chorus	25	1274	
2015	Las Vegas, Nevada	River Blenders	5	1250		Carolina Harmony	14	1231	
2016	Las Vegas, Nevada	Pearls of the Sound	32	1399		Carpe Diem	11	1296	
2017	Las Vegas, Nevada	Brindabella	34	1267		Malmö Limelight	32	1284	
2018	St. Louis, Missouri	Wellington City	35	1229		Sirens of Gotham	15	1232	
2019	New Orleans, Louisiana	Diablo Vista	12	1311		Millennium Magic	1	1271	
2020– 2021	No contest due to COVID-19 pandemic								
2022	Phoenix, Arizona	OK City		1314		Carolina Harmony		1148	
2023	Louisville, Kentucky	Melodeers		1356		Brindabella		1291	
2024	Kansas City, Missouri	A Cappella Joy		1312		Greater Auckland		1276	
2025	Columbus, Ohio	Milltown Sound		1201		Gateway		1287	

==== Results by year ====
Harmony Classic competition
2000s	San Antonio 2000 • San Antonio 2001 • San Antonio 2002 • Greenville 2003 • Greenville 2004 • Greenville 2005 • Greenville 2006 • San Antonio 2007 • San Antonio 2008 • Nashville 2009
2010s	Seattle 2010 • Houston 2011 • Denver 2012 • Honolulu 2013 • Baltimore 2014 • Las Vegas 2015 • Las Vegas 2016 • Las Vegas 2017 • St. Louis 2018 • New Orleans 2019
2020s	Not held 2020–2021 • Phoenix 2022 • Louisville 2023 • Kansas City 2024

== Quartet competition ==
=== Champions ===
From the competition's inception to the 1992 edition, the winning quartet was named champion of the year that they competed in. From the 1993 competition onwards the designation was changed to the following year – the one in which they primarily held their position. Thus, the winners of the competition held in November 2014 (Bling! quartet) were proclaimed the "2015 queens of harmony".

As with the Chorus competition, all competitors compete in the "semi-final" round from which the top 10 compete a few days later in the final round. The scores for the top 10 are added together to make the grand total which determines the winner. Until 1984 all competitors began at the "quarter-final" stage, the top 20 progress to the semi-final, and the top 10 progressing to the final. From 1985 this three-level system was dropped back to simply semi-final and final. However, because the earlier winners competed in three rounds, their grand total scores are correspondingly larger. The % column accounts for this change in maximum score to allow for comparison between years with different scoring systems.

The international champion quartet, performers names, and score for each year of competition are as follows.

Replacement quartet members must participate with a quartet for at least three years. They may earn a gold medal after that time if the quartet makes the request on her behalf for one and the Coronet Club and International Board approve it." The replaced quartet member is marked with an asterisk *

Note, some sources differ as to the inclusion of the definite article in many of the earlier quartets' names.

Year	Location	Champion	Score	%	Bio	Members	Second place	Third place	Competition summary
1947	Tulsa, Oklahoma	The Decaturettes				Vi Phillips, Mary Minton, Myrtle Vest, Eva Adams	The Johnson Sisters	Keystone Barberettes	missing
1948	Topeka, Kansas	The Johnson Sisters				Ruby Johnson, Irene Bergman, Stella Berg, Harriet St. Leger	Floradora Girls	Harmony Honeys	missing
1949	St. Louis, Missouri	The Tune Twisters				Pearl Borg, Sue Pranno, Nancy Konsbruck, Marian Moore	Treble Tones	Gibson Girls	missing
1950	Chicago, Illinois	The Harmony Belles				Dixie Rae Chapman, Betty Robinson, Jeanette McLaughlin*, Harriet Fizone, Shirley Rice^{[replacement]}	Treble Tones	Minorettes	missing
1951	Santa Monica, California	The Quarternotes				Virginia Clausen, Phyllis Odders, Lois Dominick*, Jewel King, Kaye Poulsen Jensen^{[replacement]}	Rhythm Wrens	Denim Four	missing
1952	St. Petersburg, Florida	The Pitch Pipers				Betty Oliver, Jo Ligtvoet, Jane Linden Aman, Mary Ann Oller	Hi-Lites	Pearly 'Gators	missing
1953	Milwaukee, Wisconsin	The Big Four				Lucille Bradley*, Inez "Junior" Thompson, Sarah LeMaster, Bertha Bradley, Mary Waters^{[replacement]}	The Mississippi Misses	Decker Sisters	missing
1954	Buffalo, New York	The Mississippi Misses				Nancy Bergman, Darlene Kraus, Marcy Paul, Rose Rump	The Nota-Belles	Tru-Shades	missing
1955	Grand Rapids, Michigan	The Nota-Belles				Jarmela Speta, Ruth Geils, Jan Kastens, Phyllis Haeger	The Junior Misses	Cracker Jills	missing
1956	Wichita, Kansas	The Junior Misses				Sue Lucas, Katie Durbin, Helen Peters, Chris Hohe	Cracker Jills	Dotted Quarters	missing
1957	Miami Beach, Florida	Cracker Jills				Bobbie Bostick, Renee Craig, Judy Rowell, Jan Saundry	Northwest Hi-Flyers	The Sweet And Lows	missing
1958	Peoria, Illinois	The Sweet And Lows				Florence Anderson, Joyce Cunningham, Mary Gilbert, Delores Godwin	Pleasantaires	The Caper Cutters	missing
1959	Tucson, Arizona	The Yankee Misses				Sue Arabian, Marilyn Conlan, Alice Kennedy, Marcia Major	Pleasantaires	Nightingals	missing
1960	Detroit, Michigan	The Gibson Girls				Irene Blazed*, Gladys Carlysle, Naomi Haberlein, Anne McKay, Joyce Rankin^{[replacement]}	Nightingals	Happy Harmonizers	missing
1961	Colorado Springs, Colorado	The Lyrics				Liz Speer, Lorene Roberts, Diane Pauley*, Sue McCoy, Marge Axelson^{[replacement]}	Nightingals	The Sea-Adelines	missing
1962	Toronto, Ontario, Canada	The Sea-Adelines				Shirley Humann, Jamel Barden, Katie Schwarzhans, Zoe Thompson	The Heathertones	Related Four	missing
1963	Berkeley, California	The Heathertones				Lorida Harvey, Betty Pettibon, Norma Jones, Bette Carothers	The Piper-Ettes	The Aqua-Tones	missing
1964	Minneapolis, Minnesota	The Note-Cracker Sweets				Mary Ellen Erickson, Mary Lois Dick, Beverly Schroeder, Nancy Paul	Related Four	The Shalimars	missing
1965	Denver, Colorado	The Shalimars				Ruby Rhea, Patti Staffen, Anita Gohl*, Jan Wyckoff, Ferne Hogan^{[replacement]}	The Aqua-Tones	Chi-Larks	missing
1966	Houston, Texas	The Piper-Ettes				Carolyn Sexton, Ruth Doll, Kitty Bawtenheimer, Carol Simons	Chi-Larks	Embers	missing
1967	New York, New York	The Hurricane Honeys				Nancy Calay*, Iris Cokeroft, Ruth Ann Parker, Marge Grau, Toni Miller^{[replacement]}	Chi-Larks	Embers	missing
1968	Oklahoma City, Oklahoma	The Galatones				Margaret DeJaynes, Jean Shook, Sharri Mertens, Anna Lee Scott*, Lynn Ellsworth^{[replacement]}	The Rarities	After-Five 4	missing
1969	Honolulu, Hawaii	The Metropolitans				Marie Disher, Hilma Mortell,* Pat Gibson James, Mona Warren, Lori Fodor Reiner^{[replacement]}	The Rarities	Embers	missing
1970	Boston, Massachusetts	The Rarities				Jarmela Speta, Connie Milestone, Chris Huebschen, Carol Schoenning	Embers	Bron's Tones	missing
1971	Kansas City, Missouri	Bron's Tones				Judy Wallis, Portia Little, Betty Meinholz, Bron Dixon	Embers	Debutones	missing
1972	Salt Lake City, Utah	The 4th Edition				Connie Noble, Lee Davison, Jacquelyn Belshaw,* Sally Whitledge, Nancy Belle^{[replacement]}	Embers	The Tiffanys	missing
1973	Washington, D.C.	The Tiffanys				Jane Coleman, Joan Melling, Dale Syverson, Louise Masla	Priorities	Double Image	missing
1974	Milwaukee, Wisconsin	The Sounds Of Music				Jean Barford, Gloria Laquaglia, Edie Moorehead, Judy St. John	Double Image	Latest News	missing
1975	Seattle, Washington	The Front Office Four				Dixie Dahlke, Carol Nash, Chari Pernert, Vicki Gibson	Chansonniers	The Tetrachords	missing
1976	Cincinnati, Ohio	High Society				Bette Gorton*, Kim Bone, Sandy Shelver, Pat Vozza, Connie Noble^{[replacement]}	Chansonniers	Star Spangled Sound	missing
1977	London, England	The Shondells				Melodee Wright, Virginia Fitzpatrick, Theresa Reed, Donna Graham	The Hallmarks	Sun Lasses	missing
1978	Los Angeles, California	The Tetrachords				Terry D'Amato, Patti Frei, Sandi Wright, Nancee Reinhold	The Hallmarks	S. Van Ander Mac Singers	missing
1979	St. Louis, Missouri	The Hallmarks	3799	79.15%		JoAnn Karaff, Liz Robertson, Helen Shores, Jackie Harrison	All-Star Jubilee	Midnight Music Co.	
1980	Atlanta, Georgia	Penna-Fores	3634	75.71%		Linda Showers, Shirleyann Quigg, Roberta Combs, Betty Clipman	All-Star Jubilee	Midnight Music Co.	
1981	Phoenix, Arizona	All-Star Jubilee	3910	81.46%		Susie Russell, Julie Fernstrum, Judy Gordon, Linda Johnson	Melo-Edge	Music Gallery	
1982	Minneapolis, Minnesota	Music Gallery	3892	81.08%		Julie Whelan, Julie Moser Bergman, Lou Ann Dykstra, Marcia Starnes	Melo-Edge	Jubilation	
1983	Detroit, Michigan	Melo-Edge	3823	79.65%		Donna Bates, Maureen Brzinski, Debra Peters, Janell Paviolitis	Jubilation	4 For The Show	
1984	Las Vegas, Nevada	4 For The Show	3821	79.60%		Joni Bescos, Robin Beers, Sally Briner, Susan Minsker	Jubilation	Top Priority	
1985^{[a]}	Kansas City, Missouri	Jubilation	2515	78.59%		Sharon Alterman, Carol Ann Bagley, Karen Breidert, Pat Rotunno	Top Priority	Sound Celebration	
1986	Philadelphia, Pennsylvania	Ambiance	2594	81.06%		Shelly Sweet-Rubenic, Elizabeth Hardcastle, Sandi Wright, Diane Huber	Starshine	Ginger 'N' Jazz	
1987^{[a]}	Honolulu, Hawaii	Ginger 'N'Jazz	2551	77.77%		Patty Friedemann, Debbie Hogan, Sally Beck, Judy Clancy*, Peggy Barnes^{[replacement]}	Savvy	Showtime	
1988	Houston, Texas	Savvy	2619	79.85%		Connie Noble, Kim Hulbert, Sandy Trombly, Tippi Sanders	Cross-Town Celebration	Showtime	
1989^{[a]}	Miami Beach, Florida	Growing Girls	2786	80.99%^{[b]}		Malin Palmqvist, Suzanne Harrington, Anna Ohman, Naima Meyer	Cross-Town Celebration	Panache	
1990	Salt Lake City, Utah	Panache	2810	81.69%^{[b]}		Gerry Papageorge, Pam Pieson, Sally Briner, Bonnie McKibben	Swing Street	Showcase	
1991	San Antonio, Texas	Swing Street	2763	80.32%^{[b]}		Sylvia Karpinsky, LeAnn Hazlett, Sue Snow, Sharon Cassell	Showtime	City Lights	
1992	Baltimore, Maryland	City Lights	2841	82.59%^{[b]}		Nancy Cloeter, Jo Lund, Sharon Vitkovsky, Jeannie Froelich	Showtime	Blue Razzberry Rhythm	
1993^{[c]}	Indianapolis, Indiana	Showtime	2832	82.33%^{[b]}		Gina Ogden*, Debbie Connelly, Cindy LeMasters, Dana Hitt, Donna Vollertson^{[replacement]}	Chicago Fire	Blue Razzberry Rhythm	
1994	Reno, Nevada	Chicago Fire	2812	81.74%^{[b]}		Amy Brinkman, Dani Prigge, Bon Pressley, Bonnie Fedyski	Weekend Edition	4-Star Collection	
1995	New Orleans, Louisiana	Weekend Edition	2810	81.69%^{[b]}		Penny Mensik, Susan Martin, Donna Kleinschmidt, Nancy Shumard	4-Star Collection	Rumors	
1996	Ft. Lauderdale, Florida	4-Star Collection	2927	85.09%^{[b]}		Connie Miller, Pat Rygg, Denise Baber, Marcia Starnes	Classic Edition	Rumors	
1997	Salt Lake City, Utah	Classic Edition	2784	80.93%^{[b]}		Jana Brown, Susan Ives, Sheila Martinez, Donna Kready	Rumors	Night Magic	
1998^{[a]}	Nashville, Tennessee	Rumors	2799	85.34%		Charla Esser, Judy Baxter, Dale Syverson, Peggy Gram	Signature Sound	Swinglish Mix	
1999	Atlanta, Georgia	Signature Sound	2758	84.09%		Christine Cook, Leslie Taylor, Janet Ashford, Lloyd-Ellen Thomas	Swinglish Mix	a cappella Gold	
2000	Orlando, Florida	a cappella Gold	2753	83.93%		Bette Gorton, Kim Vaughn, Tomi McEvoy, Susan Lamb Kegley	Swinglish Mix	Night Magic	
2001	Portland, Oregon	Fanatix	2699	82.29%		Connie Noble, Darcy Newell, Sandy Shelver, Gerry Papageorge*, Bonnie Fedyski^{[replacement]}	Brava!	Swinglish Mix	
2002	Nashville, Tennessee	Swinglish Mix	2726	83.11%		Eleanor Hawkins, Suzanne Harrington, Patty Hawley Pennycook, Naima Meyer	Brava!	Spotlight	
2003	Phoenix, Arizona	Brava!	2654	80.91%		Sandy Robinson Marron, Lynn Gerard, Elaine Cotton, Shannon Harris	Spotlight	SALT	
2004	Indianapolis, Indiana	The BUZZ	2796	85.24%		Nancy Cloeter, Debbie Cleveland, Karen Breidert, Jeannie Froelich	Razzcals	SALT	
2005	Detroit, Michigan	Spotlight	2810	85.67%		Kendra LaPointe, LeAnn Hazlett, Kerry Denino, Patti Britz	SALT	Four Bettys	
2006	Las Vegas, Nevada	SALT	2820	85.98%		Anna Ohman, Annika Andersson, Anna-Stina Gerdin*, Susanna Berndts, Karin Sjoblom^{[replacement]}	Four Bettys	Razzcals	
2007	Calgary, Alberta, Canada	Four Bettys	2736	83.41%		Joan Boutilier, Lynda Keever, Heather Mears Brooks, Cori Albrecht	Jackpot!	Razzcals	
2008	Honolulu, Hawaii	Moxie Ladies	2754	83.96%		Stacey St. John, Jennifer Edwards, Amy Leacock, Gretchen Holloway	Jackpot!	Razzcals	
2009	Nashville, Tennessee	Zing!	2821	86.01%		Michelle Hunget, Susan Ives, Mary Rhea, Melynnie Williams	Jackpot!	MAXX Factor	
2010	Seattle, Washington	MAXX Factor	2893	88.20%		Molly Dalton Plummer, Leslie Wodday, Kim Hudson*, Valerie Hadfield-Rasnake, Dawn Adams Clifford^{[replacement]}	Journey	Capri	
2011	Houston, Texas	Martini	2863	87.29%		Corinna Garriock, Michelle Shoemaker, DeAnne Haugen, Shannon Harris	Touché	a.k.a.	
2012	Denver, Colorado	Touché	2830	86.28%		Patty Cobb Baker, Gina Baker, Kim McCormick, Jan Anton	Bling!	LoveNotes	
2013	Honolulu, Hawaii	LoveNotes^{[e]}	2871	87.53%		Brittany Gilmore, Mia Dessenberger, Stephanie Lawson, Caitlin Smith	Bling!	a.k.a.	
2014	Baltimore, Maryland	Bling!	2817	85.88%		Dayve Gabbard, Angie Love-Callahan, Kim Griffin, Deanna Kastler	Speed of Sound	Finesse	
2015^{[d]}	Las Vegas, Nevada	Speed of Sound	2822	88.19%		Debbie Landers, Ashley Wright, Carter Maysilles, Peggy Jones*, Kim McCormick^{[replacement]}	Frenzy	Lustre	
2016	Las Vegas, Nevada	Frenzy	2799	84.47%		Melissa Pope, Nikki Blackmer, Anne Marteniuk, Judy Pozsgay	Windsor	Lustre	
2017	Las Vegas, Nevada	Lustre	2935	91.71%		Kate Morrical, Lori Crouter, Lori Dreyer, Jenny Harris	ClassRing	Windsor	
2018	St. Louis, Missouri	ClassRing	2769	86.53%		Mary Duncan, Heather Havens, Hailey Parks, Michaela Slamka-Johnston	Viva!	TITANIUM	
2019	New Orleans, Louisiana	Viva!	2862	89.44%		Patty Cobb Baker, Gina Baker, Chris DeRosa, Peggy Jones	TITANIUM	GQ	
2020– 2021	No contest due to COVID-19 pandemic								
2022	Phoenix, Arizona	The Ladies	2876	89.88%		Quincie Snook, Caroline Hunt, Kim Newcomb, Ashley Rohovit	TITANIUM	Lady A Cappella	
2023	Louisville, Kentucky	Lady A Cappella	2840	88.75%		Stacey St. John, Deidra Ronfeldt, Kerry Denino, Gretchen Holloway	Dynasty	Sirens	
2024	Kansas City, Missouri	Clever Girl	2881	90.03%		Neyla Pekarek, Ashley Tabares, Holly Janda, Taylor Daniels	Dynasty	Sirens	
2025	Columbus, Ohio	Dynasty	2972	92.88%		Sarah Clay Lindvall, Debbie Cleveland, Jenny Cutlip, Michaela Slamka-Johnson	Sirens	Duly Noted	

^{a} Until 1985 a quarter-final round was held as well as a semi-final and final. The winner's scores for these three rounds were added together, making for a higher grand total than later years when only two rounds of scores (semi-final and final) make up the grand total. In 1987 "bonus points" were introduced in the final round. From 1989 to 1997 the quarter-final was reintroduced at a lower score value. For full details of scoring changes see the scoring section above. Direct comparisons of scores in different eras are possible using the % column.

^{b} From 1989 to 1997 the official scoresheet includes bonus points in the final and grand total but does not account for them in the official %. The % marked here does account for the bonus points for the sake of consistency.

^{c} From 1993 onwards the Queens' official year designation was changed to reflect the year following their win rather than the year in which the competition was held.

^{d} Until 2015 bonus points were available in the final round. Removing these reduced the possible grand total. Direct comparisons of scores in different eras are possible using the % column.

^{e} UnderAge, the 2005 winners of the Rising Star competition, won the 2013 international quartet competition performing as LoveNotes.

=== Results by year ===
Quartet competition results
1940s	Tulsa 1947 • Topeka 1948 • St. Louis 1949
1950s	Chicago 1950 • Santa Monica 1951 • St. Petersburg 1952 • Milwaukee 1953 • Buffalo, N.Y. 1954 • Grand Rapids 1955 • Wichita 1956 • Miami Beach 1957 • Peoria 1958 • Tucson 1959
1960s	Detroit 1960 • Colorado Springs 1961 • Toronto 1962 • Berkeley 1963 • Minneapolis 1964 • Denver 1965 • Houston 1966 • New York 1967 • Oklahoma City 1968 • Honolulu 1969
1970s	Boston 1970 • Kansas City 1971 • Salt Lake City 1972 • Washington D.C. 1973 • Milwaukee 1974 • Seattle 1975 • Cincinnati 1976 • London 1977 • Los Angeles 1978 • St. Louis 1979
1980s	Atlanta 1980 • Phoenix 1981 • Minneapolis 1982 • Detroit 1983 • Las Vegas 1984 • Kansas City 1985 • Philadelphia 1986 • Honolulu 1987 • Houston 1988 • Miami Beach 1989
1990s	Salt Lake City 1990 • San Antonio 1991 • Baltimore 1992 • Indianapolis 1993 • Reno 1994 • New Orleans 1995 • Fort Lauderdale 1996 • Salt Lake City 1997 • Nashville 1998 • Atlanta 1999
2000s	Orlando 2000 • Portland 2001 • Nashville 2002 • Phoenix 2003 • Indianapolis 2004 • Detroit 2005 • Las Vegas 2006 • Calgary 2007 • Honolulu 2008 • Nashville 2009
2010s	Seattle 2010 • Houston 2011 • Denver 2012 • Honolulu 2013 • Baltimore 2014 • Las Vegas 2015 • Las Vegas 2016 • Las Vegas 2017 • St. Louis 2018 • New Orleans 2019
2020s	Not held 2020–2021 • Phoenix 2022 • Louisville 2023 • Kansas City 2024

=== Quartet records ===
==== Most international championships ====
Although a quartet is not allowed to win more than one international competition, individuals from winning quartets are permitted to join a new quartet and compete again. As of 2016, 21 people have won "dual crowns" by singing in two champion quartets, one person has won three crowns, and one person has won four times. Several winners have changed their surname by marriage in between wins; this table lists their current name followed by the name(s) they had in their championship year (in brackets). The "international champions" table, above, lists the competitor's name at that time.

Number	Name	Part	Quartet (year)
4	Connie Noble	Tenor	The 4th edition (1972); Savvy (1988); High Society (1976) [replacement]; Fanatix (2001)
3	Kim Vaughn (Bone, Hulbert)	Lead	High Society (1976); Savvy (1988); a cappella Gold (2000)
3	Debbie Cleveland (Connelly)	Lead	Showtime (1993); The BUZZ (2004); Dynasty (2025)
2	Anna Ohman	Baritone, Tenor	Growing Girls (1989), SALT (2006)
2	Bette Gorton	Tenor	High Society (1976), a cappella Gold (2000)
2	Bonnie Fedyski	Bass	Chicago Fire (1994), Fanatix (2001) [replacement]
2	Dale Syverson	Lead	Tiffanys (1973), Rumors (1999)
2	Gerry Papageorge	Tenor, Bass	Panache (1990), Fanatix (2001)
2	Jarmela Speta	Tenor	The Nota-Belles (1955), The Rarities (1970)
2	Jeannie Froelich	Bass	City Lights (1992), The BUZZ (2004)
2	Karen Breidert	Baritone	Jubilation (1985), The BUZZ (2004)
2	LeAnn Hazlett	Lead	Swing Street (1991), Spotlight (2005)
2	Leslie Shoenhard (Taylor, Wodday)	Lead	Signature Sound (1999), MAXX Factor (2010)
2	Marcia Starnes	Bass	Music Gallery (1982), 4-Star Collection (1997)
2	Michaela Slamka-Johnson	Baritone	ClassRing (2018), Dynasty (2025)
2	Naima Meyer	Bass	Growing Girls (1989), Swinglish Mix (2002)
2	Nancy Cloeter	Tenor	City Lights (1992), The BUZZ (2004)
2	Patty Cobb Baker	Tenor	Touche (2012), Viva! (2019)
2	Peggy Gram (Barnes)	Bass	Ginger 'n Jazz (1987) [replacement], Rumors (1999)
2	Sally Briner	Baritone	4 For The Show (1984), Panache (1990)
2	Sandi Wright	Baritone	The Tetrachords (1978), Ambiance (1986)
2	Sandy Shelver	Baritone	High Society (1976), Fanatix (2001)
2	Shannon Harris	Bass	Brava! (2003), Martini (2011)
2	Susan Ives	Lead	Classic Edition (1997), Zing! (2009)
2	Suzanne Harrington	Lead	Growing Girls (1989), Swinglish Mix (2002)

==== Highest ever regional scores ====
Quartets can contain members who are registered in different regions, in which case all their regions are listed. The regional competition in which they achieved their high score is marked in bold. The highest 30 scores ever achieved at any regional competition as of 2019, are as follows:

Rank	Score	Quartet	Region	Year	Competition summary
1	715	Viva!	9	2018	
2	669	GQ	19	2016	
3	668	GQ	19	2019	
4	666	All Fired Up	19	2019	
5	665	The BUZZ	**9**, 15	2004	
6	664	Milli Blink	32	2018	
7	662	Glamour	4	2016	
7	662	Ambush	32	2019	
9	660	Legacy	5	2015	
9	660	Windsor	9	2015	
9	660	Neon Lights	19	2016	
12	659	Bling!	9	2010	
12	659	Tenacious	4	2016	
12	659	Famous Janes	19	2017	
15	656	Fortuity	31	2013	
15	656	PrimeTime	13	2017	
15	656	Enchant	34	2019	
18	655	Touché	**9**, 21, 24	2011	
18	655	TITANIUM	2	2017	
20	654	ROXY	3	2011	
20	654	Milli Blink	32	2014	
20	654	Monarch	9	2015	
20	654	Pepper	13	2015	
24	652	PrimeTime	13	2015	
25	650	Gig-a-bite	32	2018	
25	650	RetroActive	12	2019	
27	649	Take Note	24	2005	
28	647	VOCE	1	2019	
29	646	The Ladies	1	2018	
30	645	ClassRing	5	2015	
30	645	Harmony	15	2017	

==== Highest regional score by region ====
The highest score ever achieved in each individual region's competition as of 2019, are as follows:

Region	Score	Quartet	Year	Competition summary
1	647	VOCE	2019	
2	633	The Vibe	2018	
3	654	ROXY	2011	
4	662	Glamour	2016	
5	660	Legacy	2015	
6	622	Spice	2019	
7	636	Zing!	2004	
7	636	HEAT	2013	
8	637	Ms. Behavin'	2002	
9	715	Viva!	2018	
10	646	The Ladies	2018	
11	637	SwingTime	2019	
12	650	RetroActive	2019	
13	656	PrimeTime	2017	
14	630	Speed of Sound	2012	missing
15	645	Harmony	2017	
16	644	Spritzer	2009	missing
16	644	Spritzer	2012	missing
17	624	Lucille	2019	
19	669	GQ	2016	
21	643	C'est la vie	2018	
22	631	Contagious	2002	
23	630	Dream	2012	
24	649	Take Note	2005	
25	655	TITANIUM	2017	
26	624	No Strings	2019	
30	no competition held			
31	656	Fortuity	2013	
32	664	Milli Blink	2018	
34	656	Enchant	2019	
35	633	ROXY	2019	

=== Rising Star ===
This quartet competition, also known as the Young Women in Harmony (YWIH) competition, is open to women 25 years old and younger.

Initially run as part of SAI's annual "International Education Symposium", from 2009 the competition was held as part of the international convention week. However, in 2013 it was decided to return to operating the competition separately due to the expense and scheduling difficulty of fitting in with the other convention events. The event was not run that year and from 2014 has been held at various events, from regional events, to other educational events like the International Education Symposium and Queens' College.

Though it follows a simplified version of the main quartet competition scoring system, the YWIH scoring system has changed several times – both in the potential maximum score and the strictness of the grading:

- In the 1999 inaugural year, four judges each gave scores out of 200 (maximum 800) and graded to the same level as normal competition
- From 2000 to 2002, no scores were given at all, only ranks
- In 2003 and 2004, four judges each gave scores out of 50 (maximum 200) and were more generous in the grading
- From 2005 to 2024, four judges each gave scores out of 50 for two songs (maximum 400).
- Since 2025, four judges each give scores out of 100 for two songs (maximum 800) and grade more strictly.

The list of Rising Star champions is as follows:

Year	Location	Quartet	Score	%	Description	Competition summary
1999	San Antonio, Texas	Dazzling Diamonds	472	59.0		
2000	San Antonio, Texas	Sandstone	missing			
2001	San Antonio, Texas	Backchat	missing			
2002	Greenville, South Carolina	Voice Activated	191	95.5		
2003	Greenville, South Carolina	BarbieShop	197	98.5		
2004	Greenville, South Carolina	Tone Appétit	200	100		
2005	Greenville, South Carolina	UnderAge^{[e]}	387	96.8		
2006	San Antonio, Texas	Footnotes	397	99.3		
2007	Calgary, Alberta, Canada	Luminous	390	97.5		
2008	San Antonio, Texas	Whole Lotta Harmony	373	93.3		
2009	Nashville, Tennessee	Vogue	370	92.5		
2010	Seattle, Washington	Royal Blush	390	97.5		
2011	Houston, Texas	The Fource	383	95.8		
2012	Denver, Colorado	GQ	397	99.3		
2013	Honolulu, Hawaii	no competition held				
2014	Lowell, Massachusetts	ClassRing	388	97.0		
2015	Scottsdale, Arizona	C'est La Vie	318	79.5		
2016	Auckland, New Zealand	The Ladies	378	94.5		
2017	College Park, Maryland	Adrenaline	375	93.8		
2018	Tulsa, Oklahoma	Hot Pursuit	387	96.8		
2019	Manchester, England	Duly Noted	382	95.5		
2020– 2021	no competition held					
2022	San Antonio, Texas	Valkyries	379	94.8		
2023	Richardson, Texas	Cosmic	397	99.3		
2024	Tulsa, Oklahoma	Radiant	388	97.0		
2025	Tulsa, Oklahoma	942 Quartet	630	78.8		
2026	Tulsa, Oklahoma	Checkmate	605	75.6		

== See also ==
- List of Barbershop Harmony Society chorus champions
- List of Barbershop Harmony Society quartet champions

== Sources ==
- Sweet Adelines International homepage
  - "Competition Handbook" (PDF) (2016 ed.). Sweet Adelines International. Archived (PDF) from the original on 28 August 2016.
  - competition records
  - 50 and Forward 1945–1995 Commemorative Album. Tulsa, Oklahoma: Sweet Adelines International. 1995. OCLC 48806117.
- Barbershophistory.com homepage
  - historical chorus results
  - competition records
- Barbershop Wiki Project homepage
  - SAI international convention
- Sweet Adelines Scores Yahoo! Group [registration required]
- Barbershop Harmony Society homepage
  - "Comprehensive Barbershop Historical Trivia Compilation". Barbershop Harmony Society. 2014. Archived from the original on 22 July 2014.
