= Sweet Adelines International Harmony Classic competitions =

Harmony Classic is a women's barbershop competition for small and mid-sized choruses run by Sweet Adelines International as part of the organisation's annual convention since 2010. The results of the competition are as follows. For a full explanation of the scoring system, qualification process, awards and records, see Sweet Adelines International competition.

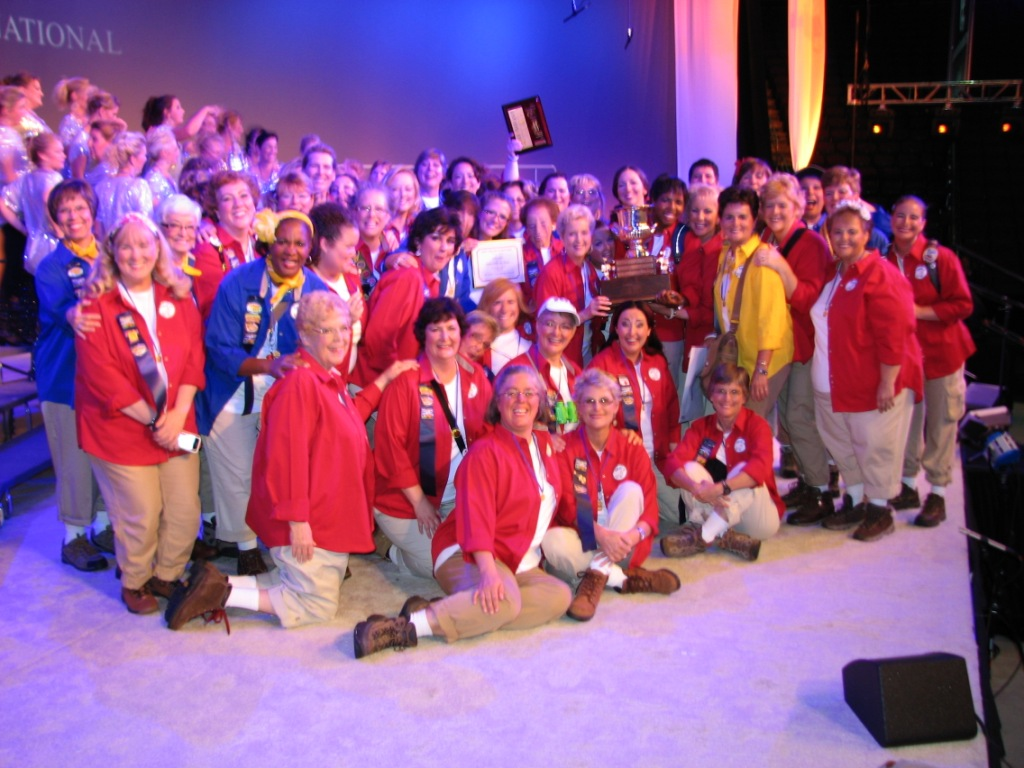
Metro Nashville Chorus having just become the "Mid-Size Chorus" (Division AA) Harmony Classic champions in Houston, 2011

Qualification for the competition happens as part of the regional chorus competition. The five highest-scoring small (division A, 15-30 singers) and midsize (division, AA 31–60 singers) choruses across all regional competitions qualify directly for the Harmony Classic of the following year. With five choruses in each of the two divisions (A & AA) a total of 10 choruses compete in this competition each year. Only one chorus from a region may compete in each of the divisions and the previous year's winner may not compete in the same division again the following year. Furthermore, a chorus may not compete in both the main competition and also the Harmony Classic at the same year. A chorus may potentially qualify for both the main chorus competition as well as the Harmony Classic, but are only permitted to compete in one, thereby making a space available for the next highest qualifier to take their place at the other competition.

== 2000 ==
San Antonio, Texas (2000)Division A – Official results
Place	Region	Contestant	Regional		Final		
Place	Region	Contestant	Score	Summary	# on stage	Order of appearance	Score
1	3	Prairie Echoes	556		26	missing	1274
2	14	Golden Triad	570		44	missing	1150
3	4	Capitol Showcase	559		27	missing	1142
4	26	Prairie Gold	593		32	missing	1139
5	9	Gainesville	561		19	missing	1056

Division AA – Official results
Place	Region	Contestant	Regional		Final		
Place	Region	Contestant	Score	Summary	# on stage	Order of appearance	Score
1	1	Royal River	603		52	missing	1275
2	6	Acappella Xpress	601		45	missing	1192
3	7	Sunflower Harmony	583		44	missing	1107
4	13	Top of the World	609		55	missing	1101
5	24	Columbia River	591		43	missing	1080

== 2001 ==
San Antonio, Texas (2001)Division A – Official results
Place	Region	Contestant	Regional		Final		
Place	Region	Contestant	Score	Summary	# on stage	Order of appearance	Score
1	32	Pearls of the Sound	548		25	4	1237
2	23	Metro Nashville	558		35	3	1196
3	5	River City Sound	559		40	1	1190
4	19	Brandywine	541		22	2	1119
5	2	Heart of Michigan	561		36	5	1112

Division AA – Official results
Place	Region	Contestant	Regional		Final		
Place	Region	Contestant	Score	Summary	# on stage	Order of appearance	Score
1	9	Jacksonville Harmony	628		58	5	1205
2	13	Spokane Falls	623		66	4	1275
3	4	Scioto Valley	604		48	1	1268
4	12	Sacramento Valley	583		55	2	1128
5	17	Greater Harmony	577		52	3	1048

== 2002 ==
Greenville, South Carolina (2002)Division A – Official results
Place	Region	Contestant	Regional		Final		
Place	Region	Contestant	Score	Summary	# on stage	Order of appearance	Score
1	3	Prairie Echoes	584		34	1	1264
2	1	Millennium Magic	564		22	3	1217
3	22	Milwaukee Showcase	578		43	2	1173
4	22^{[a]}	River City Sound	577		34	4	1153
5	23	Metro Nashville	564		30	5	1139

^{a} River City Sound qualified in region 5 but performed as representative of region 22 due to regional boundary changes before the competition.

Division AA – Official results
Place	Region	Contestant	Regional		Final		
Place	Region	Contestant	Score	Summary	# on stage	Order of appearance	Score
1	1	Royal River	615		61	2	1276
2	4	Scioto Valley	593		47	3	1220
3	5	Vermillion Valley	593		51	1	1194
4	17	Sounds Of Pittsburgh	603		60	5	1171
5	13	Jet Cities	593		43	4	1115

== 2003 ==
Greenville, South Carolina (2003)Division A – Official results
Place	Region	Contestant	Regional		Final		
Place	Region	Contestant	Score	Summary	# on stage	Order of appearance	Score
1	1	Millennium Magic	587		missing	missing	1169
2	26	Prairie Gold	580		missing	missing	1168
3	16	Circle of Harmony	575		missing	missing	1150
4	19	Altoona	584		missing	missing	1105
5	11	Golden Sands	569		missing	missing	1033

Division AA – Official results
Place	Region	Contestant	Regional		Final		
Place	Region	Contestant	Score	Summary	# on stage	Order of appearance	Score
1	19	Valley Forge	614		missing	missing	1284
2	23	TuneTown Show	596		missing	missing	1250
3	7	Wichita	594		missing	missing	1238
4	14	Vienna-Falls	594		missing	missing	1233
5	17	Sounds of Pittsburgh	602		missing	missing	1196

== 2004 ==
Greenville, South Carolina (2004)Division A – Official results
Place	Region	Contestant	Regional		Final		
Place	Region	Contestant	Score	Summary	# on stage	Order of appearance	Score
1	4	Queen City Sound	562		missing	4	1206
2	5	City Voices	584		missing	3	1167
3	22	River City Sound	588		missing	5	1118
4	14	Carolina Style	573		missing	1	1117
5	13	Anchorage Sourdough	568		missing	2	1116

Division AA – Official results
Place	Region	Contestant	Regional		Final		
Place	Region	Contestant	Score	Summary	# on stage	Order of appearance	Score
1	4	Columbus	605		missing	3	1235
2	5	Vermillion Valley	594		missing	1	1203
3	22	Fox Valley	605		missing	2	1192
4	2	Song of the Lakes^{[a]}	572		missing	4	1130
5	21	Fiesta	602		missing	5	1103

^{a} Song of the Lakes chorus was known as Thumb Area at the regional competition and subsequently changed its name.

== 2005 ==
Greenville, South Carolina (2005)Division A – Official results
Place	Region	Contestant	Regional		Final		
Place	Region	Contestant	Score	Summary	# on stage	Order of appearance	Score
1	9	Women of Note	569		missing	2	1204
2	7	Wamego Dutch Mill	567		missing	3	1174
3	19	Altoona	578		missing	1	1121
4	1	Merrimack Valley	580		missing	5	1106
5	6	Spirit of Harmony	572		missing	4	1093

Division AA – Official results
Place	Region	Contestant	Regional		Final		
Place	Region	Contestant	Score	Summary	# on stage	Order of appearance	Score
1	4	Scioto Valley	611		missing	3	1262
2	23	TuneTown Show	601		missing	4	1244
3	25	Prairie Winds	589		missing	1	1243
4	17	Sounds of Pittsburg	606		missing	5	1215
5	6	Twin Cities Show	608		missing	2	1198

== 2006 ==
San Antonio, Texas (2006)Division A – Official results
Place	Region	Contestant	Regional		Final		
Place	Region	Contestant	Score	Summary	# on stage	Order of appearance	Score
1	23	Metro Nashville	589		missing	5	1289
2	11	Santa Monica	590		missing	4	1240
3	5	City Voices	576		missing	1	1194
4	25	Oklahoma Jubilee	561		missing	3	1164
5	14	Carolina Harmony	584		missing	2	1118

Division AA – Official results
Place	Region	Contestant	Regional		Final		
Place	Region	Contestant	Score	Summary	# on stage	Order of appearance	Score
1	19	Harbor City Music Company	595		missing	4	1310
2	11	Verdugo Hills	604		missing	3	1248
3	8	High Country	587		missing	5	1187
4	4	Seven Hills	589		missing	2	1150
5	21	Enchanted Mesa Show	607		missing	1	1139

== 2007 ==
San Antonio, Texas (2007) – Official resultsDivision A
Place	Region	Contestant	Regional		Final		
Place	Region	Contestant	Score	Summary	# on stage	Order of appearance	Score
1	32	Alba Show	571		22	2	1293
2	11	Voices Unlimited	593		29	5	1249
3	14	Carolina Style	580		34	3	1209
4	34	Bathurst Panorama	567		32	4	1166
5	1	Profile	564		25	1	1079

Division AA – Official results
Place	Region	Contestant	Regional		Final		
Place	Region	Contestant	Score	Summary	# on stage	Order of appearance	Score
1	35	Waikato Rivertones	612		58	2	1312
2	1	Farmington Village	599		46	4	1286^{[a]}
3	3	Midwest Crossroad	597		missing	5	1284
4	14	Vienna-Falls	596		37	1	1170
5	26	Gateway	591		58	3	1168

^{a} The official scoresheet incorrectly lists the Farminton Village score as 1216 which was their total before the bonus points were added.

== 2008 ==
San Antonio, Texas (2008)Division A – Official results
Place	Region	Contestant	Regional		Final		
Place	Region	Contestant	Score	Summary	# on stage	Order of appearance	Score
1	32	Stockholm City Voices	561		30	4	1328
2	2	Fenton Lakes	551		27	5	1121
3	3	Prairie Echoes	542		25	3	1119
4	6	Spirit of Harmony	574		29	2	1111^{[a]}
5	25	Queen City Sound	548		20	1	1111

^{a} Spirit of Harmony and Queen City Sound both received the same total score, but Spirit of Harmony was awarded the higher place on the basis of a better score in the "sound" judging category.

Division AA – Official results
Place	Region	Contestant	Regional		Final		
Place	Region	Contestant	Score	Summary	# on stage	Order of appearance	Score
1	23	Metro Nashville	629		33	1	1303
2	5	City Voices	605		52	4	1208
3	11	Santa Monica	594		34	5	1185
4	16	Capitaland	608		52	2	1133
5	8	High Country	597		42	3	1104

== 2009 ==
Nashville, Tennessee (2009)Division A – Official results
Place	Region	Contestant	Regional		Final		
Place	Region	Contestant	Score	Summary	# on stage	Order of appearance	Score
1	1	Millennium Magic	556		21	3	1268
2	24	Idaho Falls A Cappella	557		23	1	1160
3	10	Texas Harmony	556		31	2	1153
4	8	Centennial Blend	569		34	4	1096
5	26	Prairie Gold	553		34	5	1093

Division AA – Official results
Place	Region	Contestant	Regional		Final		
Place	Region	Contestant	Score	Summary	# on stage	Order of appearance	Score
1	4	Scioto Valley	603		69	4	1350
2	25	Top of the Rock	624		58	3	1284
3	26	Gateway	616		66	2	1278
4	9	Jacksonville Harmony	627		67	5	1259
5	5	Metro Mix	601		53	1	1258

== 2010 ==
Seattle, Washington (2010) – Official resultsDivision A
Place	Region	Contestant	Regional		Final		
Place	Region	Contestant	Score	Summary	# on stage	Order of appearance	Score
1	25	Queen City Sound	564		23	4	1189
2	14	Carolina Harmony	567		22	2	1176
3	3	Prairie Echoes	582		19	5	1172
4	35	Faultline	579		25	1	1064
5	10	Spirit of Southeast Texas	573		28	3	1044

Division AA
Place	Region	Contestant	Regional		Final		
Place	Region	Contestant	Score	Summary	# on stage	Order of appearance	Score
1	19	Harbor City Music Company	617		60	1	1344
2	26	Westcoast Harmony	613		46	4	1330
3	3	Midwest Crossroad	601		47	2	1243
4	16	Greater Kingston	621		61	3	1219
5	10	Lone Star	610		45	5	1187

== 2011 ==
Houston, Texas (2011) – Official resultsDivision A
Place	Region	Contestant	Regional		Final		
Place	Region	Contestant	Score	Summary	# on stage	Order of appearance	Score
1	32	Alba Show	618		38	4	1337
2	2	Fenton Lakes	558		29	5	1112
3	6	Spirit of Harmony	563		27	1	1094
4	21	Song of the Pines	558		32	2	1092
5	31	Milltown Sound	562		22	3	1077

Division AA
Place	Region	Contestant	Regional		Final		
Place	Region	Contestant	Score	Summary	# on stage	Order of appearance	Score
1	23	Metro Nashville	627		42	2	1325
2	15	Hickory Tree	632		47	5	1240
3	2	London	617		58	4	1222
4	19	Upper Chesapeake	619		52	1	1221
5	9	Sound of Sunshine	621		35	3	1093

== 2012 ==
Denver, Colorado (2012) – Official resultsDivision A
Place	Region	Contestant	Regional		Final			Video
Place	Region	Contestant	Score	Summary	# on stage	Order of appearance	Score	Video
1	14	Carolina Harmony	581		32	3	1228	
2	16	Saratoga Soundtrack	599		40	2	1166	
3	5	Heart of Missouri	576		26	1	1102	
4	19	Diamond State	575		25	5	1089	
5	8	Bella Voce	576		17	4	1033	

Division AA
Place	Region	Contestant	Regional		Final			Video
Place	Region	Contestant	Score	Summary	# on stage	Order of appearance	Score	Video
1	26	Westcoast Harmony	638		49	5	1319	
2	12	Pacific Empire	619		57	3	1290	
3	19	Valley Forge	618		52	4	1249	
4	16	Orangeville	613		61	1	1202	
5	34	Melbourne	609		38	2	1172	

== 2013 ==
Honolulu, Hawaii (2013) – Official resultsDivision A
Place	Region	Contestant	Regional		Final			Video
Place	Region	Contestant	Score	Summary	# on stage	Order of appearance	Score	Video
1	32	Pearls of the Sound	605		41	1	1303	
2	5	Vermillion Valley Show	555		41	4	1281	
3	14	Virginia Coast	567		36	2	1123	–
4	22	Yahara River	562		37	3	1083	–
5	25	Twin City Sensations	560		30	5	979	–

Division AA
Place	Region	Contestant	Regional		Final			Video
Place	Region	Contestant	Score	Summary	# on stage	Order of appearance	Score	Video
1	26	Rhythm of the Rockies	604		55	4	1381	
2	9	Jacksonville Harmony	614		60	1	1255	
3	2	London	621		56	3	1181	–
4	11	Channelaire	602		50	5	1176	–
5	12	Northern Gateway	593		54	2	1154	–

== 2014 ==
Baltimore, Maryland (2014) – Official resultsDivision A
Place	Region	Contestant	Regional		Final			Video playlist
Place	Region	Contestant	Score	Summary	# on stage	Order of appearance	Score	Video playlist
1	7^{[a]}	Springfield Metro	569		39	4	1274	
2	31	Vocal Dimension	607		32	5	1270	
3	21	Honolulu Blend Show	581		32	2	1161	
4	2	Fenton Lakes	575		32	3	1080	
5	6	Spirit of Harmony	566		23	1	1074	

Division AA
Place	Region	Contestant	Regional		Final			Video playlist
Place	Region	Contestant	Score	Summary	# on stage	Order of appearance	Score	Video playlist
1	26	City of Gardens	612		48	5	1238	
2	21	Tucson Desert Harmony	608		60	4	1226	
3	25	Top of the Rock	604		44	2	1225	
4	10	Alamo Metro	615		56	1	1223	
5	3	Grand Rapids	606		59	3	1196	

^{a} Springfield Metro qualified in region 7 but competed representing region 25 due to regional boundary changes before the competition.

== 2015 ==
The 2015 competition was held on 7 October at the MGM Grand Las Vegas.

Las Vegas, Nevada (2015) – Official resultsDivision A
Place	Region	Contestant	Regional		Final			Video
Place	Region	Contestant	Score	Summary	# on stage	Order of appearance	Score	Video
1	14	Carolina Harmony	582		27	1	1231	
2	1	Millennium Magic	593		19	2	1160	
3	12	Oregon Spirit	584		37	4	1157	
4	15	Saratoga Soundtrack	580		32	5	1136	
5	34	Bathurst Panorama	598		36	3	1091	

Division AA
Place	Region	Contestant	Regional		Final			Video
Place	Region	Contestant	Score	Summary	# on stage	Order of appearance	Score	Video
1	5	River Blenders	617		58	1	1250	
2	31	DaleDiva	622		65	2	1249	
3	12	Pacific Empire	612		62	5	1208	
4	9	Jacksonville Harmony	613		52	3	1186	
5	1	Farmington Valley	610		38	4	1183	

== 2016 ==
The 2016 competition was held on 17 October at the MGM Grand Las Vegas, the first time the competition will have ever been held at the same location twice in a row.

Las Vegas, Nevada (2016) – Official resultsDivision A
Place	Region	Contestant	Regional		Final			Video playlist
Place	Region	Contestant	Score	Summary	# on stage	Order of appearance	Score	Video playlist
1	11	Carpe Diem	605		26	5	1296	
2	31	Vocal Dimension	603		35	1	1244	
3	5	Sound Celebration	598		41	2	1157	
4	26	Vocal Motion!	591		26	3	1099	
5	9	Gainesville Harmony	583		27	4	1004	

Division AA
Place	Region	Contestant	Regional		Final			Video playlist
Place	Region	Contestant	Score	Summary	# on stage	Order of appearance	Score	Video playlist
1	32	Pearls of the Sound	656		65	4	1399	
2	2	Great Lakes	642		51	3	1228	
3	17	Sounds of Pittsburgh	618		62	1	1199	
4	25	Springfield Metro	647		37	5	1176	
5	13	Pacific Sound	642		51	2	1137	

== 2017 ==
The 2017 competition was held on October 10. As with the 2015 and '16 editions, the 2017 competition was held at the MGM Grand Las Vegas.

Las Vegas, Nevada (2017)Division A – Official results
Place	Region	Contestant	Regional		Final			Video Playlist
Place	Region	Contestant	Score	Summary	# on stage	Order of appearance	Score	Video Playlist
1	32	Malmö Limelight	603		33	4	1284	
2	25	Wichita Chorus	580		27	1	1173	
3	15	Evergreen	567		30	5	1042	
4	2	Grand Traverse Show	612		40	2	1026	
5	5	St. Louis Harmony	585		25	3	900	

Division AA – Official results
Place	Region	Contestant	Regional		Final			Video Playlist
Place	Region	Contestant	Score	Summary	# on stage	Order of appearance	Score	Video Playlist
1	34	Brindabella	605		63	4	1267	
2	8	Velvet Hills	623		63	2	1233	
3	1	Farmington Valley	614		42	3	1215	
4	16	Greater Kingston	606		53	1	1150	–
5	9	O-Town Sound	615		44	5	1145	

== 2018 ==
The 2018 competition was held on October 17 at The Dome at America's Center in St. Louis, Missouri.

St. Louis, Missouri (2018)Division A – Official results
Place	Region	Contestant	Regional		Final			Video Playlist
Place	Region	Contestant	Score	Summary	# on stage	Order of appearance	Score	Video Playlist
1	15	Sirens of Gotham	576		32	1	1232	
2	14	Carolina Harmony	624		28	5	1202	
3	34	Circular Keys	595		40	4	1187	
4	26	Vocal Motion!	598		28	3	1171	
5	35	Bella A Cappella	586		33	4	1081	

Division AA – Official results
Place	Region	Contestant	Regional		Final			Video Playlist
Place	Region	Contestant	Score	Summary	# on stage	Order of appearance	Score	Video Playlist
1	35	Wellington City	660		48	1	1229	
2	12	Mission Valley	624		66	3	1177	
3	17	Greater Cleveland	641		58	5	1176	
4	31	No Borders Show	637		54	4	1172	
5	9	Women of Note	622		50	2	1136	

== 2019 ==
The 2019 competition took place on September 17 at the Smoothie King Center, New Orleans.

New Orleans, Louisiana (2019) - Division A - Official results
Place	Region	Contestant	Regional		Final			Video Playlist
Place	Region	Contestant	Score	Summary	# on stage	Order of appearance	Score	Video Playlist
1	1	Millennium Magic	586		22	3	1271	
2	10	A Cappella Unlimited	588		23	1	1200	
3	25	Wichita	577		35	5	1188	
4	16	Limestone City Voices	604		28	2	1188	
5	3	Vermillion Valley Show	606		30	4	1151	

Division AA - Official results
Place	Region	Contestant	Regional		Final			Video Playlist
Place	Region	Contestant	Score	Summary	# on stage	Order of appearance	Score	Video Playlist
1	12	Diablo Vista	612		67	1	1311	
2	19	Greater Harrisburg	668		72	5	1285	
3	3	Midwest Crossroad	619		42	2	1217	
4	9	Bridges of Harmony	644		51	3	1194	
5	17	Grand Rapids	612		57	4	1101	

== Sources ==
- Sweet Adelines International homepage
  - "Competition Handbook" (PDF). Sweet Adelines International. 2016.
- Barbershophistory.com homepage
  - historical chorus results
  - competition records
- Sweet Adelines Scores Yahoo! Group [registration required]
