= Peggy Gram =

Peggy Gram, née Barnes, is a women's barbershop music singer, leader of Sweet Adelines International (SAI) and Arkansas political figure.

== Musical background ==
Gram was awarded the SAI lifetime achievement award in 2010 for her long association with the organization including; being its international president, achieving "master director" status and becoming a certified competition judge. She has twice won the SAI International quartet championship – with "Ginger 'n' Jazz" (1987) and "Rumors" (1999). At the age of 22, Gram became the director of the SAI affiliated Top of the Rock chorus in 1972, and retired and became co-director in 2006. The Top of the Rock chorus has recorded three of its songs, in 1995, 2001, and 2002; which was a Christmas album.

She also has been honored with the Top of The Rock Peggy Gram Scholarship, which is awarded yearly to women in Music Education or Vocal Performance Education at the secondary level to assist in the furtherance of their music education.

== Education ==
She has a Bachelor of Science degree in English/language arts education from the University of Arkansas. Attending University of Arkansas from 1967 to 1971.

== Political career ==
Peggy Gram held the title of chief deputy to Charlie Daniels while he was Land Commissioner (1985–2003), Secretary of State (2003–2011), and State Auditor (2011–2015) in the state of Arkansas. Gram has worked for the State of Arkansas for over 30 years. She has been chair of the board of the Information Network of Arkansas.

== Personal life ==
Gram lives in Little Rock, Arkansas. Her family includes husband Robert Gram and two daughters, Kerri and Kristen.
