= Martini (quartet) =

Champion women's barbershop quartet

Martini Quartet
- Genres: Barbershop
- Years active: 2007–present
- Members: Corinna Garriock – tenor Michelle Shoemaker – lead DeAnne Haugen – baritone Shannon Harris – bass
- Past members: Sandy Marron, Lisa Myers
- Website: martiniquartet.com

Martini is the barbershop quartet that won the Sweet Adelines International Quartet Championship for 2012 on October 21, 2011, in Houston, Texas. SAI, "one of the world's largest singing organizations for women", has members over five continents who belong to more than 1200 quartets.

== History ==
Martini formed in July 2007 at Sandy Marron's home in Tacoma, Washington. Singers Sandy Marron (tenor), Lisa Myers (lead), Shannon Harris (bass) and DeAnne Haugen (bari) were the "original blend" of voices. In April 2008, Martini competed at the Sweet Adelines International Region 26 Convention in Vancouver, British Columbia and placed first with a regional record-breaking score of 623 points. Later that year, they made their International Competition debut in Honolulu, Hawaii, placing 8th in the world. In October 2009, Martini returned to the International stage in Nashville, Tennessee where they finished 4th. In early 2010, this original version of Martini also recorded their debut CD "It's Martini Time!".

In early 2010, lead Lisa Myers turned her attention to family life and Michelle Shoemaker joined the group as her replacement, traveling all the way from Atlanta, Georgia to rehearse with the quartet. In October 2010, after just a few months of rehearsal, this second version of Martini made their first International appearance in Seattle, Washington and placed 5th overall.

In January 2011, tenor Sandy Marron left the group to focus on her role as musical director of Lions Gate Chorus. Corinna Garriock, former tenor of Mojo Quartet, joined the group in March 2011 and after six rehearsals, this new Martini blend debuted on the International stage in Houston, Texas and were ultimately named the 2012 International Quartet Champions.

Since their formation, Martini has had many coaches including Carole Kirkpatrick, Jim Arns, Renee Porzel, Sandy Marron, Judy Pozsgay, Joni Bescos, Marcia Pinvidic, Dale Syverson, Ase Hagerman, Elaine Cotton, Beth Smith and Sean Devine. All four singers in Martini are long-time members of Sweet Adelines International and active in their choruses, regions and in international programs. Corinna and Shannon sing with Lions Gate Chorus in Vancouver, British Columbia. DeAnne sings with the 2012 International Chorus Champions, Melodeers (based in Chicago, Illinois). Michelle is a member of the Song of Atlanta Show Chorus in Atlanta, Georgia.

== Members ==
=== Current ===
- Corinna Garriock (tenor) – Formerly the tenor for Mojo Quartet, Corinna became the tenor for Martini in 2011, and won the Queens of Harmony title with the quartet in 2011.
- Michelle Shoemaker (lead) – Originally from Atlanta, Michelle replaced the former lead, Lisa Myers, in 2010. This swap happened only months before the new quartet's debut on the international stage. In 2011, she was also crowned a Queen of Harmony with Martini.
- DeAnne Haugen (baritone) – DeAnne is the original baritone for Martini Quartet, and has competed with the group four times in the Sweet Adelines International Competition. In 2011, she was also crowned a Queen of Harmony with Martini.
- Shannon Harris (bass) – Along with DeAnne, Shannon is an original member of Martini Quartet, and won the Queens of Harmony title with the group in 2011.

=== Retired ===
- Sandy Marron (tenor) – Sandy was the initial tenor for Martini, but has since gone on to focus on directing Lions Gate Chorus in Vancouver, B.C.
- Lisa Myers (lead) – Lisa was the initial lead voice for Martini, but departed from the group in 2010.

== Discography ==
- It's Martini Time! (CD; 2010)
- Shaken, Stirred & Crowned! (CD; 2012)

| Preceded by MAXX Factor | SAI Quartet Champions; 2012 | Succeeded by Touché |
