= Eddie Cochran discography =

- Studio albums: 1
- EPs: 19
- Live albums: 3
- Compilation albums: 27+
- Singles: 20

This article is the discography of American rock and roll musician Eddie Cochran.

== Albums ==
=== Studio albums ===
Year	Title	Details	Peak chart positions
Year	Title	Details	UK
1957	Singin' to My Baby	Released: November 1957; Label: Liberty	19

=== Live albums ===
Year	Title	Details
2005	Live at Town Hall Party 1959	Released: November 2005; Label: Sundazed
2008	Live Performances 1957–1960	Released: February 2008; Label: Rockstar
2009	Live: Rock n Roll Rebels	Released: May 2009; Label: Yellow Label/SPV; With Gene Vincent; Germany-only release

=== Compilation albums ===
Year	Title	Details	Peak chart positions
Year	Title	Details	UK
1960	Eddie Cochran	Released: April 1960; Label: Liberty; Reissued as 12 of His Biggest Hits in North America and as The Eddie Cochran Memorial Album in Europe after Cochran's death	9
1962	Never to Be Forgotten	Released: January 1962; Label: Liberty	—
1962	Cherished Memories	Released: November 1962; Label: Liberty; UK-only release	15
1964	My Way	Released: September 1964; Label: Liberty; UK-only release	—
1966	Summertime Blues	Released: August 1966; Label: Liberty	—
1970	Tenth Anniversary Album: The Very Best of Eddie Cochran	Released: April 1970; Label: Liberty	34
1971	The Legendary Eddie Cochran	Released: June 1971; Label: United Artists; UK and France-only release	—
1972	Legendary Master Series (No. 4)	Released: January 1972; Label: United Artists	—
1972	Eddie Cochran on the Air	Released: September 1972; Label: United Artists	—
1975	The Very Best of Eddie Cochran	Released: 1975; Label: United Artists	—
1979	The Eddie Cochran Singles Album	Released: July 1979; Label: United Artists	39
1980	20th Anniversary Album	Released: March 1980; Label: United Artists; UK-only release	—
1982	The Young Eddie Cochran	Released: September 1982; Label: Rockstar; UK-only release	—
1983	Great Hits	Released: 1983; Label: Liberty	—
1985	The 25th Anniversary Album	Released: April 1985; Label: Liberty; UK and France-only release	—
1985	The Best of Eddie Cochran	Released: October 1985; Label: Liberty; UK-only release	—
1987	The Best of Eddie Cochran	Released: 1987; Label: EMI America	—
1988	C'mon Everybody	Released: April 1988; Label: Liberty	53
1989	The EP Collection	Released: 1989; Label: See for Miles; UK-only release	—
1990	Eddie Cochran: The Legendary Masters Series, Volume 1	Released: 1990; Label: Liberty/EMI	—
1995	The Original	Released: August 1995; Label: Disky	—
1998	Somethin' Else: The Fine Lookin' Hits of Eddie Cochran	Released: February 1998; Label: Razor & Tie	—
2005	The Best of Eddie Cochran	Released: 2005; Label: EMI Gold	—
2008	The Very Best of Eddie Cochran	Released: June 2, 2008; Label: EMI	31
2009	The Eddie Cochran Story	Released: July 7, 2009; Label: EMI	—
2010	C'mon Everybody	Released: 2010; Label: Jasmine	—
2015	The Complete Releases 1955–62	Released: July 17, 2015; Label: Acrobat	—
2020	Eddie Cochran: The Liberty Years	Released: January 31, 2020; Label: Capitol	—
"—" denotes releases that did not chart or were not released in that territory.

== EPs ==
Year	Title (Note: This is a list of EPs released in the US and UK. Various other EPs were released elsewhere.)	Details	Peak chart positions
Year	Title	Details	UK
1957	Singin' to My Baby, Part One	Released: November 1957; Label: Liberty; US-only release	—
1957	Singin' to My Baby, Part Two	Released: November 1957; Label: Liberty; US-only release	—
1957	Singin' to My Baby, Part Three	Released: November 1957; Label: Liberty; US-only release	—
1959	C'mon Everybody	Released: May 1959; Label: London	2
1960	Somethin' Else	Released: February 1960; Label: London	6
1960	Eddie's Hits	Released: November 1960; Label: London	—
1961	Cherished Memories of Eddie Cochran	Released: November 1961; Label: London; UK-only release	—
1962	Never to Be Forgotten	Released: November 1962; Label: Liberty; UK-only release	18
1963	Cherished Memories, Volume 1	Released: May 1963; Label: Liberty; UK-only release	—
1964	C'mon Again	Released: May 1964; Label: Liberty; UK-only release	—
1964	Stockin's 'n' Shoes	Released: October 1964; Label: Liberty; UK-only release	—
1979	Walkin' Stick Boogie with Eddie Cochran	Released: 1979; Label: Rockstar; UK-only release	—
1979	Tired & Sleepy	Released: 1979; Label: Rockstar; UK-only release	—
1979	Country Style	Released: 1979; Label: Rockstar; UK-only release	—
1981	Pink-Peg Slacks	Released: 1981; Label: Rockstar; UK-only release	—
1981	More Sides Of Eddie Cochran	Released: 1981; Label: Rockstar; UK-only release	—
1986	Rare Items	Released: 1986; Label: Rockstar; UK-only release	—
1986	On Tour with Gene Vincent & Eddie Cochran	Released: 1986; Label: Rockstar; UK-only release	—
1986	West Coast Rockabillies	Released: 1986; Label: Rockstar; UK-only release	—
"—" denotes releases that did not chart or were not released in that territory.

== Singles ==
Year	Titles (A-side, B-side)	Peak chart positions						
Year	Titles (A-side, B-side)	US	UK	AUS	CAN	BE (FLA)	NL	NOR
1955	"Two Blue Singin' Stars" b/w "Mr. Fiddle"; Both tracks by the Cochran Brothers	—	—	—	—	—	—	—
1955	"Your Tomorrows Never Come" b/w "Guilty Conscience"; Both tracks by the Cochran Brothers	—	—	—	—	—	—	—
1956	"Walkin' Stick Boogie" b/w "Rollin'"; Both tracks by Jerry Capehart featuring the Cochran Brothers	—	—	—	—	—	—	—
1956	"Tired and Sleepy" b/w "Fool's Paradise"; Both sides by the Cochran Brothers	—	—	—	—	—	—	—
1956	"Skinny Jim" b/w "Half Loved"	—	—	—	—	—	—	—
1957	"Sittin' in the Balcony" b/w "Dark Lonely Street" (US); "Completely Sweet" (UK)	18	—	30	—	—	—	—
1957	"Mean When I'm Mad" b/w "One Kiss"	—	—	—	—	—	—	—
1957	"Drive In Show" b/w "Am I Blue"	82	—	—	—	—	—	—
1957	"Twenty Flight Rock" b/w "Cradle Baby"	—	—	—	—	—	—	—
1958	"Jeannie Jeannie Jeannie" b/w "Pocketful of Hearts"	94	—	—	—	—	—	—
1958	"Teresa" b/w "Pretty Girl"	—	—	—	—	—	—	—
1958	"Summertime Blues" b/w "Love Again"	8	18	18	10	—	—	—
1958	"C'mon Everybody" b/w "Don't Ever Let Me Go"	35	6	88	—	20	—	—
1959	"Teenage Heaven" b/w "I Remember"	99	—	—	—	—	—	—
1959	"Somethin' Else" b/w "Boll Weevil Song"	58	22	—	—	—	—	—
1959	"Hallelujah, I Love Her So" b/w "Little Angel"	—	22	45	—	—	—	—
1960	"Three Steps to Heaven" b/w "Cut Across Shorty"	108	1	—	—	—	10	7
1960	"Lonely" b/w "Sweetie Pie"	—	41; 38	—	—	—	—	—
1961	"Weekend" b/w "Lonely" (US); "Cherished Memories" (UK)	—	15	—	—	—	—	—
1963	"My Way" b/w "Rock 'n' Roll Blues"	—	23	—	—	—	—	—
"—" denotes releases that did not chart or were not released in that territory.

=== Charting reissues ===
Year	Titles (A-side, B-side)	Peak chart positions		
Year	Titles (A-side, B-side)	UK	GER	IRE
1961	"Jeannie, Jeannie, Jeannie" b/w "Pocketful of Hearts"	31	—	—
1966	"Summertime Blues" b/w "C'mon Everybody"	55 (Note: Chart position is from the UK Breakers/Bubbling Under chart.)	—	—
1968	"Summertime Blues" b/w "Let's Get Together"	34	25	—
1975	"Summertime Blues" b/w "C'mon Everybody"	53	—	—
1988	"C'mon Everybody" b/w "Don't Ever Let Me Go"	14	—	7
1988	"Somethin' Else" b/w "Boll Weevil Song"	100	—	—
"—" denotes releases that did not chart or were not released in that territory.
