= Legendary Masters Series =

Compilation album by Eddie Cochran
- Released: January 1972
- Recorded: May 1956 to August 1959
- Genres: Rock and roll, rockabilly
- Label: United Artists
- Producer: Various

Eddie Cochran chronology
| Summertime Blues (1966) | Legendary Masters Series (1972) | Eddie Cochran on the Air (1972) |

Singles from Legendary Masters Series
- 1. "Jeannie Jeannie Jeannie" Released: January 1958

Professional ratings
Review scores
| Source | Rating |
|---|---|
| Allmusic | 4.5/5 stars |

Legendary Masters Series is the fourth album posthumously released in the US after Eddie Cochran's death in 1960. The release featured liner notes by Lenny Kaye. It was described as a "double - disc set [that] presents to the public virtually everything that rocker Cochran put out".

== Content ==
The album was released as a two album set on the United Artists label in January 1972. The catalogue number was UAS 9959, and was part of a successful series of budget re-issues by the company.

Lester Bangs described the release in Rolling Stone magazine as consisting of "genre pieces are rather uneven but consistently interesting". When EMI took over the ownership of the label towards the end of the 1980s, a selection from the 2-LP set (17 of 30 tracks) was released on CD as Eddie Cochran: Legendary Masters Series, Volume 1 (#92809) in 1990.

== Track listing ==
Side one
| No. | Title | Writer(s) | Length |
|---|---|---|---|
| 1. | "Skinny Jim" | Jerry Capehart / Eddie Cochran | 2:09 |
| 2. | "Let's Get Together" | Jerry Capehart / Eddie Cochran | 1:55 |
| 3. | "Eddie's Blues" | Jerry Capehart / Eddie Cochran | 3:55 |
| 4. | "Little Lou" | Jerry Capehart / Eddie Cochran | 1:40 |
| 5. | "Pink Pegged Slacks" | Jerry Capehart / Eddie Cochran / Hank Cochran | 2:07 |
| 6. | "Jeannie Jeannie Jeannie" | George Motola / Ricky Page | 2:20 |
| 7. | "Somethin' Else" | Sharon Sheeley / Bob Cochran | 2:07 |

Side two
| No. | Title | Writer(s) | Length |
|---|---|---|---|
| 1. | "Pretty Little Devil" | Fred Carter, Jr | 2:04 |
| 2. | "Who Can I Count On" | Sammy Masters | 2:20 |
| 3. | "Thinkin' About You" | Bob Luman / Fred Carter, Jr | 2:02 |
| 4. | "Opportunity" | Jewel Akens / Eddie Daniels | 1:52 |
| 5. | "Latch On" | Dale Fitzsimmons / Ray Stanley | 1:36 |
| 6. | "I'm Ready" | Sylvester Bradford / Fats Domino / Al Lewis | 1:33 |
| 7. | "Three Stars" | Tommy Dee | 3:29 |
| 8. | "Cotton Picker" | Mike Deasy | 2:10 |

Side three
| No. | Title | Writer(s) | Length |
|---|---|---|---|
| 1. | "Summertime Blues" | Jerry Capehart / Eddie Cochran | 1:55 |
| 2. | "Cut Across Shorty" | Marijohn Wilkin / Wayne P. Walker | 1:51 |
| 3. | "Milk Cow Blues" | Kokomo Arnold | 2:40 |
| 4. | "My Way" | Jerry Capehart / Eddie Cochran | 2:13 |
| 5. | "Blue Suede Shoes" | Carl Perkins | 1:50 |
| 6. | "Nervous Breakdown" | Eddie Cochran | 2:30 |
| 7. | "C'mon Everybody" | Jerry Capehart / Eddie Cochran | 1:53 |

Side four
| No. | Title | Writer(s) | Length |
|---|---|---|---|
| 1. | "Sittin' In The Balcony" | Johnny Dee / John D. Loudermilk | 1:58 |
| 2. | "Twenty Flight Rock" | Eddie Cochran / Ned Fairchild | 1:43 |
| 3. | "Teenage Cutie" | Jerry Capehart / Eddie Cochran | 1:50 |
| 4. | "Hallelujah I Love Her So" | Ray Charles | 2:15 |
| 5. | "Fourth Man Theme" | Jerry Capehart / Eddie Cochran | 1:59 |
| 6. | "Weekend" | Bill Post / Doree Post | 1:50 |
| 7. | "Bo Weevil" | Jerry Capehart / Eddie Cochran / Traditional | 1:57 |
| 8. | "Long Tall Sally" | Robert "Bumps" Blackwell / Enotris Johnson / Richard Penniman | 1:43 |
