= The Very Best of Eddie Cochran (1975 album) =

Compilation album by Eddie Cochran
- Released: 1975
- Recorded: January 1957 to August 1959
- Genre: Rock and roll
- Label: United Artists
- Producer: Various

Eddie Cochran chronology
| Legendary Masters Series (1972) | The Very Best of Eddie Cochran (1975) | Great Hits (1983) |

The Very Best of Eddie Cochran is the fifth album posthumously released in the US after Eddie Cochran's death in 1960.

== Content ==
The album was released on the United Artists Records label in 1975. The catalogue number was LA.428-E.

== Track listing ==
Side 1

1. "Summertime Blues"
2. "Sittin' in the Balcony"
3. "Twenty-Flight Rock"
4. "Cut Across Shorty"
5. "Nervous Breakdown"

Side 2

1. "C'mon Everybody"
2. "Hallelujah! I Love Her So"
3. "Teenage Heaven"
4. "Somethin' Else"
5. "Milk Cow Blues"
