= Summertime Blues (album) =

Compilation album by Eddie Cochran
- Released: August 1966
- Recorded: March 1957 to May 1958
- Genre: Rock and roll
- Label: Sunset

Eddie Cochran chronology
My Way (1964)	Summertime Blues (1966)	Legendary Masters Series (1972)

Professional ratings
Review scores
Source	Rating
Allmusic	2012

Summertime Blues is the third album posthumously released by Eddie Cochran in the United States after Cochran's death in 1960.

== Content ==
The album was released on the Sunset Records label in August 1966 in both stereo and mono. The catalogue number was SUS-5123 for the stereo version and SUM-1123 for the mono version.

== Track listing ==
Side 1

1. "Summertime Blues" (Eddie Cochran - Jerry Capehart)
2. "Stockins 'n Shoes (Bare foot Rock)" (Lyle Gaston)
3. "Proud Of You" (Dale Fitzsimmons)
4. "Lovin' Time" (Jan Woolsey)
5. "Completely Sweet" (Eddie Cochran - Jerry Capehart)

Side 2

1. "One Kiss" (Eddie Cochran - Johnny Russell (singer))
2. "Mean When I'm Mad" (Eddie Cochran - Jerry Capehart)
3. "Tell Me Why" (Eddie Cochran)
4. "Undying Love" (Eddie Cochran - Jerry Capehart)
5. "Lonely" (Eddie Cochran - Sharon Sheeley)
