= The Eddie Cochran Memorial Album =

Compilation album by Eddie Cochran
- Released: May 1960
- Recorded: January 1957 – January 1960
- Genres: Rock and roll, rockabilly
- Length: 26:02
- Label: Liberty
- Producers: Eddie Cochran; Simon Jackson; Snuff Garrett

Eddie Cochran chronology
Singin' to My Baby (1957)	The Eddie Cochran Memorial Album (1960)	Never to Be Forgotten (1962)

Singles from The Eddie Cochran Memorial Album
- 1. "Drive in Show" Released: 1957; 2. "Sittin' in the Balcony" Released: 1957; 3. "Teenage Heaven" Released: February 1959; 4. "Hallelujah I Love Her So" Released: November 1959; 5. "Cut Across Shorty" Released: March 1960; 6. "Three Steps to Heaven" Released: March 1960 (USA) May 1960 (UK)

Professional ratings
Review scores
Source	Rating
Allmusic	Allmusic review 2012

The Eddie Cochran Memorial Album is the second album by Eddie Cochran, released on Liberty Records in mono, LRP 3172, in May 1960. It had previously been issued as 12 of His Biggest Hits in April 1960 with the same catalogue number, but after Cochran's death on April 17 it was retitled and reissued, and has remained so titled ever since. It is currently in print on the Magic Records label in France, on CD on EMI-Toshiba in Japan, and on BGO in the UK as a twofer with "Singin' To My Baby."

== Content ==
Eight tracks were released as singles, with "Three Steps to Heaven" appearing as a b-side. Three additional tracks "Have I Told You Lately That I Love You," "Lovin' Time," and "Tell Me Why" had been released on his first album, Singin' to My Baby in 1957. All five singles that appeared on the Billboard Hot 100 are included, with the teen anthem "Summertime Blues" being the only time Cochran made the top ten. No Cochran album has ever charted in the United States.

== Personnel ==
- Eddie Cochran – guitar, ukulele, bass guitar, piano, percussion, vocals
- Mike Henderson, Mike Deasy – saxophone
- Perry Botkin Jr., Sonny Curtis – electric guitar
- Ray Johnson, Jim Stivers – piano
- Connie "Guybo" Smith – double bass, bass guitar
- Don Myers - bass
- Dave Shriver – bass
- Earl Palmer, Gene Riggio, Jerry Allison – drums
- Jerry Capehart, Sharon Sheeley – percussion
- The Johnny Mann Chorus – backing vocals

== Track listing ==
Chart positions from Billboard Hot 100; all catalogue numbers Liberty Records.

=== Side one ===
Track	Recorded	Catalogue	Release date	Chart peak	Song title	Writer(s)	Time
1.	10/10/58	55166	10/58	No. 35	"C'mon Everybody"	Eddie Cochran and Jerry Capehart	1:54
2.	1/8/60	55242b	3/60		"Three Steps to Heaven"	Eddie Cochran	2:11
3.	1/8/60	55242	3/60		"Cut Across Shorty"	Marijohn Wilkin and Wayne Walker	1:48
4.	7/57	LRP 3061	11/57		"Have I Told You Lately That I Love You?"	S. Wiseman	2:32
5.	10/21/59	55217	11/59		"Hallelujah I Love Her So"	Ray Charles	2:17
6.	1/57	55056	2/57		"Sittin' in the Balcony"	John D. Loudermilk	1:58

=== Side two ===
Track	Recorded	Catalogue	Release date	Chart peak	Song title	Writer(s)	Time
1.	3/28/58	55144	7/58	No. 8	"Summertime Blues"	Eddie Cochran and Jerry Capehart	1:57
2.	6/57	LRP 3061	11/57		"Lovin' Time"	Jan Woolsey	2:04
3.	6/23/59	55203	7/59	No. 58	"Somethin' Else"	Bob Cochran and Sharon Sheeley	2:03
4.	7/57	LRP 3061	11/57		"Tell Me Why"	Eddie Cochran	2:14
5.	1/59	55177	2/59	No. 99	"Teenage Heaven"	Eddie Cochran and Jerry Capehart	2:04
6.	5/57	55087	7/57	No. 82	"Drive In Show"	Fred Dexter	2:00
