= That's My Desire =

1931 song by Helmy Kresa and Carroll Loveday

"That's My Desire" is a 1931 popular song with music by Helmy Kresa and lyrics by Carroll Loveday.

The highest-charting version of the song was recorded by the Sammy Kaye orchestra in 1946, although a version of the song recorded by Frankie Laine has become better known over the years, being one of Laine's best-known recordings. It has been recorded by many other singers, including a number of doo-wop groups.

In 1998, the 1946 recording by Frankie Laine was inducted into the Grammy Hall of Fame.

== Charted hit versions ==
"That's My Desire"

Single by Frankie Laine
- B-side: "By the River Sainte Marie"
- Released: 1946
- Recorded: August 27, 1946
- Genre: Blues
- Label: Mercury (nr. 5007)
- Songwriters: Helmy Kresa, Carroll Loveday

Frankie Laine singles chronology
"Ain't That Just Like a Woman" (1946)	"That's My Desire" (1946)	"Texas and Pacific" (1947)

The recording by the Sammy Kaye orchestra was released by RCA Victor Records as catalog number 20-2251, with the flip side "Red Silk Stockings and Green Perfume". It first reached the Billboard Best Seller chart on June 13, 1947 and lasted 17 weeks on the chart, peaking at No. 2. The recording by Frankie Laine was recorded on August 27, 1946, with Mannie Klein's Orchestra, and released by Mercury Records as catalog number 5007, with the flip side "By the River Sainte Marie". Laine's first chart hit, the release first appeared on the Billboard Best Seller chart on June 27, 1947 and lasted four weeks on the chart, peaking at No. 4. The Laine version also appeared on Billboard′s Most- Played Juke Box Race Records chart, peaking at No. 4. Despite the higher chart position of the Kaye version, the Laine version is the widely reported million-seller, and in 1998, Laine's 1946 recording was inducted into the Grammy Hall of Fame.

The recording by Hadda Brooks on the smaller Modern Records label also peaked at No. 4 on the R&B chart in 1947.

Martha Tilton recorded March 1947, released by Capitol Records as catalog number 395, with the flip side "I Wonder, I Wonder". The single reached No. 10 in June 1947 and remained there for nine weeks.

The Hollies' version, recorded in Abbey Road studios 1 March 1965 appeared on the group's third LP. In South Africa and Rhodesia, it was released as a single and went to No. 1 in both countries in 1967.

== Eddie Cochran version ==
"That's My Desire"

Song by Eddie Cochran

from the album Eddie Cochran On The Air
- Released: 1962
- Recorded: 1956
- Genre: Pop
- Length: 2:06
- Label: EMI
- Songwriters: Helmy Kresa, Carroll Loveday
- Producer: Eddie Cochran

Eddie Cochran recorded his version of "That's My Desire" in early summer of 1956 at Gold Star Recording Studios. It was first released in the UK in 1962 on the album "Cherished Memories". The first release in the US was on the album Eddie Cochran On The Air in 1987.

Personnel on the session:

- Eddie Cochran: vocal, guitar
- Conrad 'Guybo' Smith: stand-up bass
- Jerry Capehart: box slapping

== Other versions ==
- Ronnie Dove recorded the song in 1967 for his album, The Best of Ronnie Dove Volume 2.
- Louis Armstrong and his orchestra (recorded March 19, 1947, released by Decca Records as catalog numbers 28105 and 28106, with the flip side "On the Sunny Side of the Street"; re-recorded July 1952, released by Decca Records as catalog number 28372, with the flip side "Baby, It's Cold Outside").
- Hadda Brooks (1947)
- Butanes (1961)
- Chuck Carbo and The Spiders (recorded November 29, 1956, released by Imperial Records as catalog number 5423, with the flip side "Honey Bee").
- The Cats and the Fiddle (vocal by Austin Powell; released by Manor Records as catalog number 1064, with the flip side "When Elephants Roost in Bamboo Trees").
- The Channels (1957)
- Patsy Cline (1962)
- Chris Connor (recorded January 28, 1960, released by Atlantic Records as catalog number 2053, with the flip side "I Only Want Some").
- Dion & the Belmonts (1959), released by Laurie Records as catalog number 3044, with the flip side "Where or When".
- Ella Fitzgerald with Bob Haggart's Orchestra and the Andy Love Quintet (recorded 1947, released by Decca Records as catalog number 23866, later re-issued as catalog number 28993 both with the flip side "A Sunday Kind of Love").
- The Flamingos (recorded January 28, 1953, released by Chance Records as catalog number 1140, with the flip side "Hurry Home Baby").
- Gogi Grant on her 1959 album Granted - It's Gogi
- Woody Herman and his orchestra (recorded March 19, 1947, released by Columbia Records as catalog number 37329, with the flip side "Ivy").
- Buddy Holly (1958)
- The Lettermen (1961)
- Jerry Lee Lewis (1956)
- Al Martino
- Art Mooney and his orchestra (vocal: Bud Breese; recorded 1947, released by MGM Records as catalog number 10020B, with the flip side "Mahzel").
- Piano Red (released by Groove Records as catalog number G-0145, with the flip side "I'm Nobody's Fool").
- Cliff Richard (1959, on his album Cliff Sings).
- Jim Reeves (1957 on the album Jim Reeves)
- The Shadows (1961, on the album The Shadows).
- Nana Mouskouri (1962, on the album The Girl from Greece Sings).
- Nat Shilkret and the Victor Orchestra (recorded June 9, 1931, released under the name "Ronald Sachs and his Orchestra" by Timely Tunes Records as catalog number C-1584, with the flip side "Swamp Ghosts").
- James Brown (1969)
- Maynard Ferguson performed vocals and trumpet on a version that appeared on his 1995 album Footpath Cafe.
- Yvonne Baker and the Sensations (April 1962 on ARGO 5412; No. 69 on Billboard Hot 100 June 1962)
