= Eddie Cochran Great Hits =

Great Hits

Compilation album by Eddie Cochran
- Released: 1983
- Recorded: May 1956 to August 1959
- Genre: Rock and roll
- Label: Liberty LN-10204
- Producer: Various

Eddie Cochran chronology
The Very Best of Eddie Cochran (1975)	Great Hits (1983)	On the Air (1987)

Professional ratings
Review scores
Source	Rating
Allmusic	2012

Eddie Cochran Great Hits is the sixth album posthumously released in the US after Eddie Cochran's death in 1960.

== Content ==
The album was released on the Liberty Records label in 1983. The catalogue number was LN-10204. The liner notes were written by Brian Setzer of the Stray Cats.

== Track listing ==
Side 1

1. "Summertime Blues"
2. "Let's Get Together"
3. "Long Tall Sally"
4. "Pink-Peg Slacks"
5. "C'mon Everybody"

Side 2

1. "Twenty Flight Rock"
2. "Hallelujah! I Love Her So"
3. "Blue Suede Shoes"
4. "Somethin' Else"
5. "Skinny Jim"
