= The Very Best of Eddie Cochran =

The Very Best of Eddie Cochran may refer to:

- The Very Best of Eddie Cochran (2008 album)
- The Very Best of Eddie Cochran (1975 album)
