= Sweetie Pie (song) =

- UK 45 single release on London Records.

Single by Eddie Cochran

from the album Never to Be Forgotten
- A-side: "Lonely"
- Released: August 1960
- Recorded: May–August, 1957
- Genre: Rock and roll, rockabilly
- Label: Liberty Records
- Songwriter(s): Eddie Cochran, Jerry Capehart, Johnny Russell
- Producer(s): Simon Jackson

Eddie Cochran singles chronology
"Three Steps to Heaven" (1960)	"Sweetie Pie" (1960)	"Weekend" (1960)

"Sweetie Pie" is a song written by Eddie Cochran, Jerry Capehart, and Johnny Russell and recorded by Eddie Cochran. It was recorded in 1957 and released posthumously as a single on Liberty F-55278 in August 1960. In the UK the single rose to number 38 on the charts. The U.S. release did not chart. The flip side, "Lonely", reached number 41 on the UK singles chart. Keld Heich has recorded the song in 2010.

== Album appearances ==
The song appeared on the 1962 Never To Be Forgotten album, the 1979 Eddie Cochran Singles Album compilation, the 1999 Eddie Cochran: Legends Of The 20th Century collection on EMI, the 2005 The Best of Eddie Cochran album on EMI, and the 2009 Bear Family Records box set Somethin' Else: The Ultimate Collection.

== Personnel ==
- Eddie Cochran: vocal, guitar
- Conrad 'Guybo' Smith: electric bass
- Perry Botkin: rhythm guitar
- Unidentified: drums

== Other recordings ==
The song has been recorded by The Alligators in 1992, Ricky Norton in 1997, and Keld Heick in 2010.

== Charts ==
Chart (1960)	Peak position
UK Singles Chart	38
