= Am I Blue? =

1929 song copyrighted by Harry Akst and Grant Clarke; popularized by Eddie Cochran

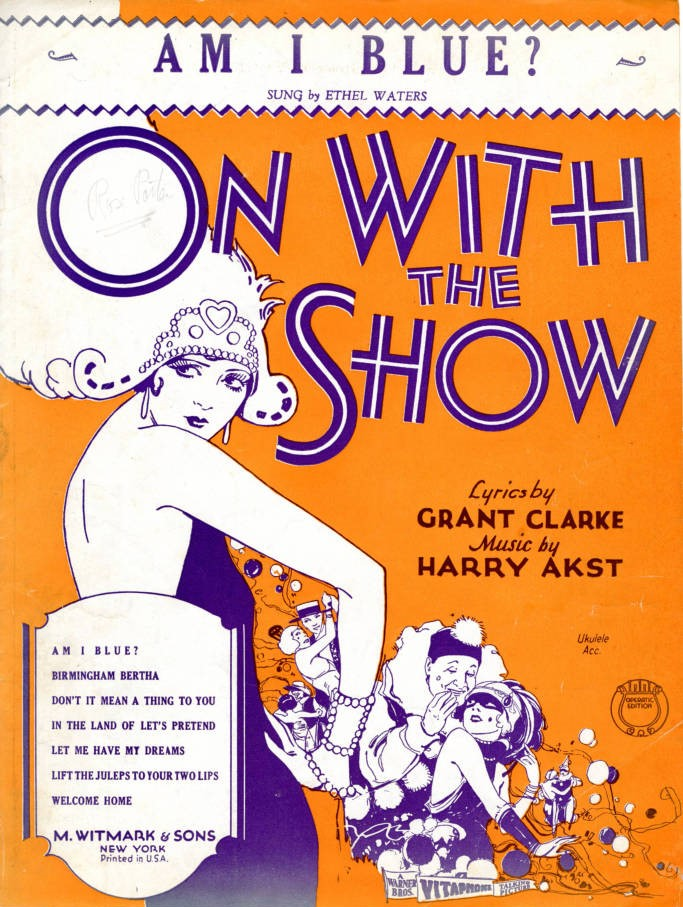
Sheet music cover, 1929

"Am I Blue?" is a 1929 song composed by Harry Akst (music) and Grant Clarke (lyrics), and published by M. Witmark & Sons. It was featured in four films that year, most notably with Ethel Waters in the movie On With the Show. (Note: Ethel Waters' 1929 single "Am I Blue?" was inducted into the Grammy Hall of Fame in 2007.) It has become a standard covered by numerous artists. As a work from 1929 with its copyright renewed, it entered the public domain on January 1, 2025. (Note: Numerous renewals in the 1956 catalogs including R1708l4)

== Eddie Cochran version ==
"Am I Blue"

Single by Eddie Cochran
- A-side: "Drive In Show"
- Released: 1957
- Recorded: May–August 1957, Gold Star Studios
- Genre: Rockabilly
- Label: Liberty 55087
- Songwriters: Harry Akst; Grant Clarke
- Producer: Simon Jackson

Eddie Cochran singles chronology
"One Kiss" (1957)	"Am I Blue" (1957)	"Twenty Flight Rock" (1957)

Eddie Cochran, an early performer of rock and roll music, also recorded his version of "Am I Blue" sometime between May and August 1957. It was released on the B-side of Liberty Records single 55087. The A-side was "Drive In Show" which rose to number 82 on the Billboard charts.

Personnel used in the recording session:

- Eddie Cochran – guitars, ukulele, vocals
- Perry Botkin – rhythm guitar
- Connie "Guybo" Smith – double bass
- The Johnny Mann Chorus – backing vocals
