= Drive In Show =

"Drive in Show"

Single by Eddie Cochran

from the album The Eddie Cochran Memorial Album
- B-side: "Am I Blue"
- Released: 1957
- Recorded: May–July 1957, Gold Star Studios
- Genre: Rockabilly
- Label: Liberty
- Songwriter(s): Fred Dexter
- Producer(s): Simon Jackson

Eddie Cochran singles chronology
"One Kiss" (1957)	"Drive in Show" (1957)	"Twenty Flight Rock" (1957)

"Drive In Show" is a song originally performed by Eddie Cochran and released on single by Liberty Records in July 1957. "Drive In Show" backed with "Am I Blue" rose to number 82 on the Billboard charts.

== Background ==
"Drive In Show" was recorded sometime between May and August 1957. The song featured an orchestra and chorus under the direction of Johnny Mann. The writer was Fred Dexter. The song was published by American Music. Sheet music was released for the song with a photograph of Eddie Cochran on the cover.

== Personnel ==
- Eddie Cochran – guitars, ukulele, vocals
- Perry Botkin Sr. – rhythm guitar
- Connie "Guybo" Smith – double bass
- The Johnny Mann Chorus – backing vocals

== Chart performance ==
Chart (1957)	Peak position	Total weeks
US Billboard Hot 100	82	6
