= Singin' to My Baby =

Studio album by Eddie Cochran
- Released: Original: November 1957; Re-issue: 1981
- Recorded: May – August 1957
- Studios: Gold Star Studios, Hollywood
- Genres: Rock and Roll: rockabilly; pop; country
- Length: 26:00
- Label: Liberty
- Producer: Simon Jackson

Eddie Cochran chronology
Singin' to My Baby (1957)	The Eddie Cochran Memorial Album (1960)

Singles from Singin' to My Baby
- 1. "Sittin' in the Balcony / Dark Lonely Street" Released: February 1957; 2. "One Kiss / Mean When I'm Mad" Released: May 1957; 3. "Twenty Flight Rock / Cradle Baby" Released: November 1957

Singin' to My Baby is the only album by Eddie Cochran, released on Liberty Records in mono in November 1957. The catalogue number was LRP 3061. It was the only album Eddie Cochran released during his lifetime. He died on April 17, 1960.

The album peaked at No. 19 on the UK Album Chart in 1960, and recharted in 1963 at No. 20.

== Content ==
The album contained the hit single "Sittin' in the Balcony" which rose to number 18 on the Billboard chart in 1957. The song was written by John D. Loudermilk under the pseudonym Johnny Dee. Cochran lip-synched to the song on the Saturday Night Beechnut Show hosted by Dick Clark.

Eddie Cochran co-wrote three of the songs with Jerry Capehart: "Completely Sweet", "Undying Love", and "Mean When I'm Mad". He wrote the words and music to the final song on the album, "One Kiss". He also adapted "Tell Me Why" from the 1945 song "Tell Me Why (The Stars Do Shine)" written by Mitchell Parish, Michael Edwards, and Sigmund Spaeth, which itself was adapted from the 1899 song "Why I Love You" composed by Roy L. Burtch with lyrics by Fred Mower.

== Track listing ==
Side one
No.	Title	Writer(s)	Length
1.	"Sittin' in the Balcony"	Johnny Dee	1:58
2.	"Completely Sweet"	Jerry Capehart, Eddie Cochran	2:17
3.	"Undying Love"	Jerry Capehart, Eddie Cochran	2:05
4.	"I'm Alone Because I Love You"	Ira Schuster, Joe Young	2:20
5.	"Lovin' Time"	Jan Woolsey	2:04
6.	"Proud of You"	Dale Fitzsimmons	1:56

Side two
No.	Title	Writer(s)	Length
1.	"Mean When I'm Mad"	Jerry Capehart, Eddie Cochran	1:50
2.	"Stockings and Shoes"	Lyle Gaston	2:04
3.	"Tell Me Why"	Eddie Cochran	2:15
4.	"Have I Told You Lately That I Love You?"	Scotty Wiseman	2:23
5.	"Cradle Baby"	Terry Fell	1:45
6.	"One Kiss"	Eddie Cochran	1:42

=== 1981 reissue ===
The album was re-issued by Liberty in 1981 as a ten-track album, omitting "I'm Alone Because I Love You" and "Have I Told You Lately That I Love You". The catalogue number was LN-10137.

In 1999, Liberty released the album on CD for the Japan market as TOCP-53090 as part of the Rock The 100 Series.

== Personnel ==
- Eddie Cochran – guitar, ukulele, vocals
- Perry Botkin Sr. – rhythm guitar
- Connie "Guybo" Smith – double bass
- The Johnny Mann Chorus – backing vocals

== Chart performance ==
Chart	Peak position	Total weeks
1960 UK Albums Chart	19	1
1963 UK Albums Chart	20	1
