= My Way (Eddie Cochran song) =

- UK 45 rpm single.

Single by Eddie Cochran

from the album My Way
- B-side: "Rock 'n' Roll Blues"
- Released: April 1963
- Recorded: January 17, 1959
- Genre: Rock and roll
- Label: Liberty; EMI
- Songwriters: Eddie Cochran; Jerry Capehart
- Producer: Eddie Cochran

Eddie Cochran singles chronology
"Never" (1962)	"My Way" (1963)	"Drive-In Show" (1963)

"My Way" is a song co-written and recorded by American rock and roll musician Eddie Cochran. It was recorded in January 1959 and released posthumously as a single by Liberty Records in April 1963. In the UK the single reached number 23 on the charts.

== Background ==
"My Way" was written by Eddie Cochran and Jerry Capehart. It was released posthumously as a 45 single in April 1963 in the UK as LIB 10088 on Liberty Records/E.M.I. backed with "Rock 'N' Roll Blues". The single reached number 23 on the UK singles chart in a ten-week run. The song was recorded on January 17, 1959. The single was also released in Germany, Sweden, and the Netherlands.

The song appeared on the 1964 UK album My Way. The song was also featured on the 1972 Legendary Masters Series compilation album.

== Personnel ==
- Eddie Cochran - vocal, guitar, guitar overdub
- Irving Asby - guitar
- Conrad 'Guybo' Smith - bass
- Ray Johnson - piano
- Jewell Grant - saxophone
- Plas Johnson - saxophone
- Jackie Kelso - saxophone
- Unidentified - drums

== Other recordings ==
"My Way" has been recorded by The Who who also performed it live at the Fillmore East in New York on April 6, 1968. The studio recording is on the reissued Odds & Sods compilation album.

George Thorogood recorded the song on his 1979 Better Than the Rest album. He also released the song as a 45 single on MCA in the U.S. and Australia.

The song has also been recorded by Blue Rock in 1977 on EMI in Belgium, The Real Kids in 1977, The Rattlers on their Live in Europe album, Dr. Feelgood in 1984 on Demon Records, The Rockats in 1982, who performed the song on the USA Hot Spots TV program, Johnny Angel and the Nomads, Guana Batz in 1986 on I.D. Records, and a live version in 2010 by Eddie Nichols. The Blasters, James Intveld, and Albert Lee performed the song at the Eddie Cochran Festival.

== Chart performance ==
Chart (1963)	Peak position
UK Singles Chart	23
