= Sweetie Pie =

Sweetie Pie may refer to:

- A term of endearment, a word or phrase used to address and/or describe a person, animal or inanimate object for which the speaker feels love or affection
- Sweetie Pie (Tiny Toon Adventures), a fictional character from Tiny Toon Adventures
- Sweetie Pie (song), a song by Eddie Cochran
