= Have I Told You Lately That I Love You? =

1947 single by Scotty Wiseman

Song
- Published: 1944 by Hilliard-Currie
- Genre: Country
- Composer: Scotty Wiseman

"Have I Told You Lately That I Love You?" is a popular song written by Scotty Wiseman for the 1944 musical film, Sing, Neighbor, Sing and performed by Lulu Belle and Scotty. It was their greatest hit and one of the first country music songs to attract major attention in the pop music field. Although the song was featured in the movie, it was not released by Lulu Belle and Scotty until 1947 (and then again in 1956). The first released version of this song was by Gene Autry in 1945.

== Bing Crosby and the Andrews Sisters version ==
"Have I Told You Lately That I Love You?"

Single by Bing Crosby and the Andrews Sisters
- B-side: "Quicksilver"
- Released: 1949
- Recorded: November 25, 1949
- Genre: Easy Listening
- Length: 3:17
- Label: Decca
- Songwriter: Scotty Wiseman

Bing Crosby and the Andrews Sisters recorded the song on November 25, 1949 and it had a good reception from the trade magazine Billboard who said: "Ditty’s a sprightly mountain-musiker that had its innings a couple of years back on straight hillbilly diskings. Bing and the gals are in top form as they harmonize it to a spanking fare-thee-well." The record entered the Billboard charts on January 21, 1950, and in a four-week stay it peaked at No. 24.

== Lulu Belle and Scotty version ==
"Have I Told You Lately That I Love You?"

Single by Lulu Belle and Scotty
- B-side: "In the Heart of a Fool"
- Released: 1956
- Recorded: 1956
- Genre: Country
- Label: Mercury
- Songwriter: Scotty Wiseman

Lulu Belle and Scotty released their version in 1956 on a Mercury Records 45 rpm single.

== Elvis Presley version ==
The earliest and easily most prominent recording of "Have I Told You Lately That I Love You" in the early rock era was by Elvis Presley. According to the book of the CD-boxset "Elvis - The Complete 50's Masters", Presley recorded it on January 19, 1957, at RCA's Radio Recorders in Hollywood for his Loving You album. Session musicians for the song included Presley himself on acoustic guitar, Scotty Moore on electric guitar, Bill Black on double bass, D. J. Fontana on drums, Dudley Brooks on piano, Hoyt Hawkins on organ, and the Jordanaires on background vocals. When the song was included on the Loving You album release in July 1957, it immediately prompted both Ricky Nelson and Eddie Cochran to record cover versions of the song. Nelson's was the "B" side of a hit single ("Be-Bop Baby", released in September), while Cochran's was an album cut (released in November). The impact of the Elvis version was felt across the Atlantic.

== Eddie Cochran version ==
"Have I Told You Lately That I Love You"

Song by Eddie Cochran

from the album Singin' to My Baby
- Released: November 1957
- Recorded: August 1957
- Genre: Country
- Length: 2:32
- Label: Liberty
- Songwriter: Scotty Wiseman
- Producer: Simon Jackson

Eddie Cochran recorded his version in August 1957 and released it on the album Singin' to My Baby. Musicians on the session were:

- Eddie Cochran - guitars, ukulele, vocals
- Perry Botkin Sr. - rhythm guitar
- Connie "Guybo" Smith - double bass
- The Johnny Mann Chorus - backing vocals

== Other versions ==
- Ricky Nelson on his 1957 album Ricky Imperial LP 9048 USA and the B-side to "Be-Bop Baby"
- Gene Autry – one of the first recorded versions of this song, which went to number 3 on the C&W charts in 1946. For many years it was the standard, and still is to many people today.
- Bob Hope with Bing Crosby (This was a parodied version which was used in Crosby's radio show on February 1, 1950.)
- Al Martino - included in his album Painted, Tainted Rose (1963).
- Willie Nelson (on his 1967 album Make Way for Willie Nelson)
- Jim Reeves - included in the album Have I Told You Lately That I Love You? (1964).
- Marty Robbins - included in his album The Songs of Robbins (1957 Columbia Records) and "Have I Told You Lately That I Love You?" (1974).
- Ringo Starr (on his 1970 album Sentimental Journey)
- Pat and Shirley Boone - included in their album I Love You Truly (1962).
- The Chieftains & Van Morrison on the album "The Long Black Veil" (1995)

== Charting versions ==
Year	Artist	Chart Positions		
Year	Artist	U.S. C&W	U.S.	CAN
1946	Red Foley	5	—	—
1946	Gene Autry	3	—	—
1946	Tex Ritter	3	—	—
1950	Bing Crosby & Andrews Sisters	—	24	—
1957	Ricky Nelson	—	29	—
1957	Elvis Presley	—	—	13
1968	Kitty Wells & Red Foley	74	—	—
