= Murder by Contract =

1958 film by Irving Lerner

- Directed by: Irving Lerner
- Written by: Ben Simcoe
- Produced by: Leon Chooluck
- Starring: Vince Edwards
- Cinematography: Lucien Ballard
- Edited by: Carlo Lodato
- Music by: Perry Botkin
- Production company: Orbit Productions
- Distributed by: Columbia Pictures
- Release date: December 1958 (United States)
- Running time: 81 minutes
- Country: United States
- Language: English

Murder by Contract is a 1958 American film noir crime film directed by Irving Lerner. Academy Award-nominated screenwriter Ben Maddow did uncredited work on the film. Centering on an existentialist hit man assigned to kill a woman, the film is often praised for its spare style and peculiar sense of cool.

The film has exerted an influence on American cinema, most notably on director Martin Scorsese, who famously cited Murder by Contract as "the film that has influenced [him] most."

== Plot ==
Claude is a disaffected man who, in search of fast money to purchase a $28,000 house, decides to become a contract killer for a Mr. Brink. After proving his worth by killing targets in a barber shop and a hospital for a Mr. Moon, whom he then kills at Brink's behest, Claude is given a contract to kill a witness in a high-profile trial, which starts in two weeks in Los Angeles.

At first calm about the assignment, spending the first several days sightseeing to check if his handlers, George and Marc, are being followed, Claude becomes agitated when he discovers the witness in question is a woman, Billie Williams; in his opinion, women are harder to kill than men, because they are "unpredictable". Claude scrambles to find a way to kill Billie, who never leaves her closely guarded house. After two attempts, Claude believes he has killed her, but later discovers that he mistakenly killed a policewoman instead, and the police have covered it up to avoid further attempts on Billie's life.

Out of ideas and convinced the contract is "jinxed", Claude quits, only to find George and Marc have now been instructed to kill him. After killing the men, Claude finally succeeds in sneaking into Billie's house via a culvert, but hesitates when he is about to strangle her. The police arrive; Claude attempts to escape via the culvert but is killed in a shoot-out.

Claude is set apart from the other hit men in the story by his unwillingness to carry a gun, and his clinical, precise approach to murder, which he treats as a business.

== Cast ==
- Vince Edwards as Claude
- Phillip Pine as Marc
- Herschel Bernardi as George
- Caprice Toriel as Billie Williams
- Michael Granger as Mr. Moon
- Cathy Browne as Mary
- Joseph Mell as Harry
- Frances Osborne as Miss Wiley
- Steven Ritch as plainclothesman
- Janet Brandt as woman in movie theater
- Davis Roberts as clerk
- Don Garrett as James William Mayflower
- Gloria Victor as Miss Wexley
- Cisco Houston as rifle salesman (uncredited)

== Production ==
Murder by Contract was directed by Irving Lerner from an original screenplay by Ben Simcoe. At some point, Ben Maddow, who had been nominated for an Academy Award for his screenplay for The Asphalt Jungle, did uncredited work on the script (Maddow also worked uncredited on several other notable films of the era, including Johnny Guitar and The Wild One). The film was shot in seven days in February 1958 in Los Angeles. Produced by Orbit Productions, it was distributed theatrically in December 1958 by Columbia Pictures. Columbia still holds the copyright on the film, dated October 1, 1958.

== Reception ==
Part of the film's reputation lies in its influence on director Martin Scorsese, who cites it as the one that has influenced his approach to filmmaking the most. Scorsese praises its "economy of style" and compares its ability to communicate ideas through cinematic "shorthand" to the work of Jean-Luc Godard and Robert Bresson. In the September–October 1978 issue of Film Comment, Scorsese included the film in his list of Guilty Pleasures. In addition to the aforementioned ideas, he specifically pointed out the scene showing Claude getting in shape and how it influenced a similar sequence with Robert De Niro in Taxi Driver.

Reviewing it for the Chicago Reader, Jonathan Rosenbaum praises the film as "singular and nearly perfect", noting its "lean, purposeful style" and "witty feeling for character, dialogue, and narrative ellipsis." In overview of a 2006 Film Forum series on film noir for Slant Magazine, Fernando F. Croce writes that "[Irving] Lerner's camera records [Vince] Edwards's moral emptiness with a sharpshooter's calm." The Time Out Film Guide describes Murder by Contract as a "terrific, no-nonsense B movie", praising it as "well ahead of its time" and adding that "Lerner and his superb cameraman, Lucien Ballard, make the most of a shoestring budget to produce a taut, spare, amoral film; it doesn't look restricted, it looks restrained."

Variety's original 1958 review singles out Perry Botkin's music for the film for praise, noting that the all-guitar score gives "fine atmospheric backing." Writing in the Radio Times, film-maker Anthony Sloman called Murder by Contract "a real gem and total justification for the existence of the B-movie", praising the "darkly sinister plot [which] masks a deeply original screenplay proffering philosophical insights into what makes hitman Vince Edwards tick." He summarised the film as "stunningly well directed by Irving Lerner and cleverly produced on a shoestring, this might be called pretentious by some; another view is that it's original, clever and absorbing. Also tough as nails." On Rotten Tomatoes, the film has an aggregate score of 100% based on 12 critic reviews.

The single The Executioner Theme from the film reached number 39 on Canada's CHUM Chart.

== Home media ==
The film was released on Blu-ray as part of the boxed set "Columbia Pictures Film Noir Classics, Vol. 2 (Framed / 711 Ocean Drive / The Mob / Affair in Trinidad / Tight Spot / Murder by Contract).
