= Sandy Stewart (singer) =

American jazz and cabaret singer

Sandy Stewart (born Sandra Esther Galitz; July 10, 1937) is an American jazz and cabaret singer. Her son is jazz pianist Bill Charlap and her husband was Moose Charlap.

== Early life and education ==
Sandy Stewart was born in Philadelphia, Pennsylvania, the daughter of Samuel Galitz, an owner of an egg, butter and cheese store in the Strawberry Mansion section of Philadelphia. When she was nine years old, she began performing on radio station WPEN in Philadelphia as a member of the cast of Jackie Kane's Juvenile Variety Show. Sandy Stewart attended high school at Lincoln College Prep School, which she graduated from in 1955.

== Career ==
When Stewart was 15, she recorded "Since You Went Away from Me", which led to her making guest appearances on network radio and television shows. In her teens she sang on the radio for NBC accompanied by a band of Mundell Lowe, Dick Hyman, Eddie Safranski, and Don Lamond. After moving to New York City, she worked on the Ernie Kovacs television program and during her career appeared on programs hosted by Ed Sullivan and Johnny Carson. In 1959 she acted with Alan Freed in the movie Go, Johnny, Go!.

Stewart performed regularly on Ed McMahon's Get Happy TV show in Philadelphia, and she frequently filled in for Denise Lor on Garry Moore's daytime TV program. As a singer she performed with Steve Allen, Perry Como, Bing Crosby, and Benny Goodman. During the 1961–63 television seasons, she appeared often on The Perry Como Show as part of The Kraft Music Hall Players with Don Adams, Kaye Ballard and Paul Lynde.

Stewart worked as a ghost singer, dubbing singing segments for stars in films, and she recorded jingles for commercials for products including Bain De Soleil, Easy Spirit, and Enjoli. She had a hit song with "My Coloring Book", which reached number 20 in the Billboard Top 40 in 1963. The record was nominated for the 1962 Grammy Award for Best Solo Vocal Performance, Female.

== Personal life ==
On December 11, 1955, Stewart married Saul Kane. She later married first composer Moose Charlap and later trumpeter George Triffon.

== Discography ==
- Selections from the Unsinkable Molly Brown (RCA Camden, 1961)
- My Coloring Book (Colpix, 1963)
- Sandy Stewart and Family (Cabaret, 1994) – recorded in 1993
- Sandy Stewart Sings the Songs of Jerome Kern with Dick Hyman at the Piano (Audiophile, 1995) with Dick Hyman (piano) – recorded in 1994. songs of Jerome Kern.
- Love Is Here to Stay (Blue note, 2005) with Bill Charlap (piano) – recorded in 2004
- Something to Remember (Ghostlight, 2012) with Bill Charlap (piano) – recorded in 2011
