= Shane Cullinan =

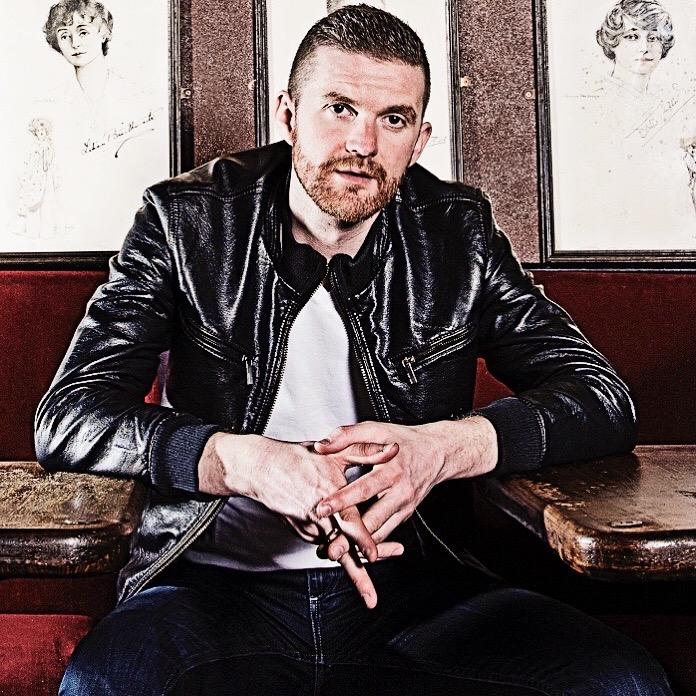

Shane Cullinan is a composer, arranger and lyricist whose work ranges from compositions for TV and film to orchestral dramas and opera.

== Life and career ==
Cullinan has worked independently as a composer and arranger since graduating from Nottingham Trent University.

His focus for composition for string quartet came in the form of a residency at Princeton University, New Jersey and featured on his first commercial recording, Y=-X2. His film credits include the music to Insight In Mind, The Nuclear Train and The Silent Train, all for Channel 4. His score to Insight In Mind, a short film about mental illness, was screened at the National Film Theatre, London..

His first orchestral drama, The Pieta, had its world premiere in St James's Church, Piccadilly, London in May 2009, featuring actor Frances Barber as the narrator with a subsequent cast recording being commercially released through Cayos Records. The work was revived for a performance at Royal Northern College of Music

The text and score to his work The Magpie was the inspiration behind the play, Dirty Pretty Secrets, which premiered at the Edinburgh Festival Fringe.

Cullinan works with his orchestral collective, Tonic Fold, who have released three albums. They include Numbers Rush By which was released in January 2008 and won the Overplay Songwriters Award 2008 and was shortlisted for the UK Songwriters Awards.

His album, The Violent Language of Portraits, features guest artists Kathy Burke, David McAlmont, Chris New, Rachel Tucker and Tom Parsons.

Cullinan has continued to work for theatre and film and on projects with the Royal Opera House, The Urban Culture Project, Tonic Fold, Cargem Theatre, Hanby & Barrett, and Channel 4. In 2017 he was appointed as composer and musical director for the prolific West-End production of Lady Windermere's Fan directed by Kathy Burke starring Jennifer Saunders, Samantha Spiro, Kevin Bishop and Joseph Marcell, produced by Dominic Dromgoole Classic Spring Company at Vaudeville Theatre London.

== Discography ==
=== Albums ===
- Y=-X2 - Shane Cullinan (EP)
- The Beachcomber - Shane Cullinan
- Letter to East - Shane Cullinan
- Demonstration – Shane Cullinan
- The Run - Tonic Fold (EP)
- The Magdalens - Tonic Fold
- Numbers Rush By – Tonic Fold
- The Pieta - Shane Cullinan
- The Violent Language of Portraits - Tonic Fold
- The Everlights - Shane Patrick Cullinan

== Theatre ==
- Lady Windermere's Fan, Director Kathy Burke, Vaudeville Theatre London
- The Acid Circus, Castlegate Hall in Nottingham and Town Hall Manchester
- Dirty Pretty Secrets, Edinburgh Festival Fringe
- Anthony on a Bench on a Hill, in pre-production

== Opera ==
- Tacitly Type Tabes, Bonnington Gallery, Nottingham
- The Pieta, St James's Church, Piccadilly, London & RNCM Manchester

== Film/TV ==
- Becca's Earth (Soundtrap/Channel 4 pilot)
- The Nuclear Train (Channel 4, Animate! series)
- Insight In Mind (Swings And Roundabouts in association with Arts Council England)
