= Frances Barber =

British actress (born 1958)

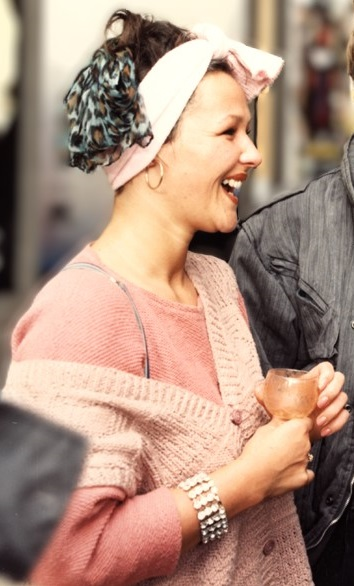
- Barber in 1985
- Born: Frances Brookes; 13 May 1958 (age 68); Wolverhampton, England
- Education: University College of North Wales
- Occupation: Actress
- Years active: 1979–present

Frances Barber (née Brookes, born 13 May 1958) is an English actress. She received Olivier Award nominations for her work in the plays Camille (1985), and Uncle Vanya (1997). Her film appearances include three collaborations with Gary Oldman in Prick Up Your Ears (1987), We Think the World of You (1988) and Dead Fish (2005); as well as Sammy and Rosie Get Laid (1987); Soft Top Hard Shoulder (1992); and latterly Film Stars Don't Die in Liverpool (2017). Barber's numerous television credits include The Street (2009), Doctor Who (2011), Silk (2012–2014), and Whitstable Pearl (2021–2025).

== Life and career ==
Barber was born in Wolverhampton, Staffordshire. Her parents are S.W. Brookes and Gladys Simpson; Barber is the fourth of six children. She attended the Wolverhampton Municipal Grammar School.

Barber studied drama at the University College of North Wales in Bangor, where she was a contemporary of director Danny Boyle, who became her boyfriend.

She appeared in the Pet Shop Boys' musical Closer to Heaven in 2001 as well as being guest singer for the song "Friendly Fire" on the Pet Shop Boys' 2006 live concert at the Mermaid Theatre. She also appeared alongside Ian McKellen and Roger Allam in the Old Vic's pantomime production of Aladdin in the 2005–2006 Christmas season. She again starred with Ian McKellen in 2007 playing Goneril in Trevor Nunn's production of King Lear and as Arkadina in Chekhov's The Seagull with the Royal Shakespeare Company in Stratford-upon-Avon followed by a world tour throughout the year. They again performed the two plays in repertory at the New London Theatre on Drury Lane, opening in November 2007 and closing mid-January 2008.

In 2011, Barber guest-starred in the Doctor Who episodes "A Good Man Goes to War" and "The Wedding of River Song" (and five other episodes, sometimes uncredited) as Madame Kovarian. She also acted in the television film We'll Take Manhattan as Diana Vreeland. In 2019, she starred in the Pet Shop Boys' musical Musik.

In May 2022, Barber appeared as Lesley in series 8 episode 4 of BBC dark comedy series, Inside No. 9 (2022), in the episode titled "Love Is a Stranger".

== Political views ==
She signed a letter supporting a No vote ahead of the 2014 Scottish independence referendum. After the Scottish National Party won 56 seats at the 2015 general election, she caused controversy after making comments on Twitter comparing the SNP to the Third Reich, further stating "God help us all is all I can say when the racist S.N.P. try to take over, England will react we will have civil war."

She supported Remain during the 2016 United Kingdom European Union membership referendum.

Barber urged a vote for the Labour Party at the 2017 UK general election. Critical of Labour leader Jeremy Corbyn, she said "I will vote Labour holding my nose. Urge you too." In September 2017, she resigned from the party, saying: "I can't belong to a party full of Misogyny, Anti-Semitism and Thuggery". In the 2019 United Kingdom general election, she backed the Liberal Democrats.

In 2018, she was among the signatories to a letter published in The Observer arguing that debate surrounding reforms of the Gender Recognition Act were being silenced. In September 2020, she signed a further letter in support of J.K. Rowling, against what The Scotsman described as "the abuse and death threats" Rowling had received after publicising her views.

== Recognition ==
In 2006, Barber received an honorary fellowship from the University of Wolverhampton.

== Theatre ==
- Ooh La La (Hull Truck Theatre, 1979)
- Riff Raff Rules (Theatre Royal Stratford East)
- Space Ache (Tricycle Theatre, 1980)
- Emilia in Othello (Oxford Playhouse)
- La Guerra (The Battle), Desperado Corner and Madame Louise (Glasgow Citizens', 1980, and Venice Biennale Festival, 1981)
- The Treat (Institute of Contemporary Arts)
- The Mission (Soho Poly)
- Hard Feelings (Oxford Playhouse and The Bush, 1983)
- Turning Over (The Bush, 1983)
- Marguerite in Camille (Royal Shakespeare Company, The Other Place, 1984, and Comedy Theatre, 1985 – Olivier nomination for Most Promising Newcomer)
- Ophelia in Hamlet (RSC Barbican Theatre, 1985)
- Love's Labour's Lost (RSC The Other Place, Comedy Theatre, 1985)
- The Dead Monkey (RSC The Pit, 1986))
- Summer and Smoke (Haymarket Theatre)
- Viola in Twelfth Night (Renaissance, Riverside Studios, 1987)
- Lady Macbeth in Macbeth (Royal Exchange, Manchester, 1988)
- My Heart's a Suitcase (Royal Court, 1990)
- Over a Barrel (Watford Palace Theatre)
- Imagine Drowning (Hampstead Theatre, 1991)
- Maxine Faulk in The Night of the Iguana (National Theatre, 1992)
- Eliza Doolittle in Pygmalion (National Theatre, 1992)
- Insignificance (Donmar Warehouse, 1995)
- Uncle Vanya (Minerva Theatre, Chichester and Albery Theatre, 1996 – TMA Award and Olivier nomination for Best Supporting Actress)
- Closer (Lyric Theatre, National Theatre West End transfer, 1998)
- Billie Trix in Closer to Heaven (Arts Theatre, 2001)
- Valerie in Tales from the Vienna Woods (National Theatre, 2003)
- Nurse Ratched in One Flew Over the Cuckoo's Nest (Gielgud Theatre, 2004)
- Dim Sum in Aladdin (Old Vic pantomime, 2005)
- The Narrator in Shane Cullinan's The Pieta St Paul's, Covent Garden, 2006)
- Cleopatra in Antony and Cleopatra (Shakespeare's Globe, London, 2006)
- Arkadina in The Seagull and Goneril in King Lear (RSC, Courtyard Theatre Stratford-upon-Avon, and New London Theatre, 2007)
- Madame de Sade (Donmar West End, Wyndham's Theatre, 2009)
- Afterplay (Edinburgh Festival, then Gate Theatre, Dublin, 2009)
- Julius Caesar (Donmar Theatre, 2012–2013)
- Lady Sneerwell in The School for Scandal (Lucille Lortel Theatre, New York City, 2016)
- Mrs Cheveley in An Ideal Husband (Vaudeville Theatre, London, May 2018)
- Billie Trix in Musik (Edinburgh Festival Fringe, August 2019 and Leicester Square Theatre, London, September 2019 and February 2020)
- Polonius in Hamlet (Theatre Royal Windsor, 2021)
- Elsa Jean Krakowski in The Unfriend (Chichester Festival Theatre, Chichester, 2022 and The Criterion, London, 2023)

== Selected filmography ==
=== Film ===
Year	Title	Role	Notes
1982	The Missionary	Mission Girl	
1982	Get Well Soon		BFI health and safety film; made at Lewisham Abbey National Building Society
1983	A Flame to the Phoenix	Wanda Grabinska	
1985	Acceptable Levels	Jill	
1985	A Zed & Two Noughts	Venus de Milo	
1985	White City	Alice	
1986	Castaway	Sister Saint Winifred	
1987	Prick Up Your Ears	Leonie Orton	
1987	Sammy and Rosie Get Laid	Rosie Hobbs	
1988	We Think the World of You	Megan	
1988	Victim of the Brain		
1989	Chambre à part	Gert	
1991	Young Soul Rebels	Ann	
1991	Secret Friends	Angela	
1992	Soft Top Hard Shoulder	Miss Trumble	
1994	Du fond du coeur	Anna Lindsay	
1994	Giorgino	Marie	
1997	Photographing Fairies	Beatrice Templeton	
1998	Still Crazy	Lady in Black	
1999	The Escort	Jessica	
2000	Esther Kahn	Rivka Kahn	
2000	Shiner	Georgie	
2001	Superstition	Isabella Flores	
2002	The Red Siren	Eva	
2002	24 heures de la vie d'une femme	Betty	
2002	Flyfishing	Frances	
2003	Boudica	Agrippina	
2004	Suzie Gold	Joyce Spencer	
2004	Evilenko		
2005	Goal!	Carol Harmison	
2005	Dead Fish	S & M Prostitute	
2007	Goal II: Living the Dream	Carol Harmison	
2012	May I Kill U?	Bernice	
2015	Mr. Holmes	Madame Schirmer	
2016	The Chosen	Natalia Sedova	
2017	Film Stars Don't Die in Liverpool	Joy	
2017	The Escape	Alison	
2017	The Bookshop	Jessie	
2018	An Ideal Husband	Mrs. Cheveley	
2018	Blue Iguana	Princess	
2021	A Bird Flew In	Marie	
2025	A Hand to Hold	Moira	
2026	Virginia Woolf's Night and Day		
2026	Eddie Cochran: Don't Forget Me	Alice Cochran	

=== Television ===
Year	Title	Role	Notes
1988	Twelfth Night	Viola / Cesario	Television film
1989	Behaving Badly	Rebecca	Mini-series
1989	Red Dwarf	Genny	Episode: "Polymorph"
1990	Agatha Christie's Poirot	Lady Millicent	Episode: "The Veiled Lady"
1992	Inspector Morse	Nicole Burgess	Episode: "The Death of the Self"
1992	The Leaving of Liverpool	Ellen	Television film
1993	The Inspector Alleyn Mysteries		Episode: "Scales of Justice"
1995	Space Precinct	Erika Brandt	Series
1996	Rhodes	Princess Catherine Radziwill	Mini-series
1997	The Ice House	Diana Goode	Mini-series
1997	A Royal Scandal	Lady Jersey	Television film
1998	Dalziel and Pascoe	Amanda "Cap" Marvell	Episode: "The Wood Beyond"
1999	Murder Most Horrid	Gloria Twigge	Series
1999	Plastic Man	Louise Ferman	Mini-series
1999	Bremner, Bird and Fortune		Series
2001	Gimme Gimme Gimme	Janine	
2002	Manchild	Elizabeth	Series
2003	My Family	Vanessa	Series
2003	Monkey Dust		Voice
2005	Agatha Christie's Marple	Lizzie Hinchcliffe	Episode: "A Murder Is Announced"
2005	Funland	Connie Woolf	Mini-series
2006	The IT Crowd	Doctor Mendall	Episode: "Aunt Irma Visits"
2006	New Tricks	Anita Walsh	Episode: "Dockers"
2007	Hustle	Clarissa	Series
2008	Beautiful People	Miss Prentice	Series
2008	King Lear	Goneril	Television film
2009	Agatha Christie's Poirot	Merlina Rival	Episode: "The Clocks"
2009	The Fattest Man in Britain	Janice	Television film
2009	The Royal		
2010	Midsomer Murders	Constance Fielding	Episode: "Master Class"
2011	Doctor Who	Eye Patch Lady / Madame Kovarian	Series
2011	Great Expectations	Mrs. Brandley	Mini-series
2011	Friday Night Dinner	Sheila Bloom	Series
2011	Death in Paradise	Diana Watson	Series 1 episode 2 Wicked Wedding Night
2012	We'll Take Manhattan	Diana Vreeland	Television film
2012	Vexed	Pat Poynter	Series
2012–2014	Silk	Caroline Warwick QC	Series
2014	The Life of Rock with Brian Pern		Series
2014	Mapp & Lucia	Amelia	Mini-series
2016	Benidorm	Daisy	Series
2016	Medici: Masters of Florence	Piccarda	Series
2017	Father Brown	Davina Malmort	Episode: "The Labyrinth of the Minotaur"
2017	Midsomer Murders	Ingrid Lockston	Episode: "Crime and Punishment"
2018	The Queen and I	Margaret	Television film
2019	Casualty	Nancy / Claire Wakelins	Series
2020	Cold Feet	Maxine Ibsen	
2021	Whitstable Pearl	Dolly Nolan	Series
2021	The Mezzotint	Mrs Ambrigail	Television film
2022–2025	The Chelsea Detective	Olivia Arnold	Series
2023	Inside No. 9	Lesley	Episode: "Love Is A Stranger"
2026	Coronation Street	Celeste Butterfield	

=== Music video ===
Year	Title	Role	Notes
2011	Deeper Understanding	Wife of a computer junkie	Kate Bush album Director's Cut

== See also ==
- List of people from Wolverhampton
