= My Way (Eddie Cochran album) =

Compilation album by Eddie Cochran
- Released: September 1964
- Genre: Rock and roll
- Label: Liberty LBY1205
- Producer: Various

Eddie Cochran chronology
Cherished Memories (1962)	My Way (1964)	Summertime Blues (1966)

Singles from My Way
- 1. "My Way" Released: April 1963

Professional ratings
Review scores
Source	Rating
Allmusic	2013

My Way is a compilation album by Eddie Cochran, posthumously released in 1964 in the UK by Liberty Records. It has been noted for its emphasis on the Blues influences.

The album has never been released in the United States.

== Track listing ==
1. "My Way" (Capehart/Cochran)
2. "Little Angel" (Winn)
3. "Eddie's Blues"
4. "Love Again" (Sheeley)
5. "I Almost Lost My Mind" (Hunter)
6. "Jam Sandwich"
7. "Little Lou" (Capehart/Cochran)
8. "Blue Suede Shoes"
9. "Hammy Blues"
10. "My Love to Remember"
11. "Milk Cow Blues"
12. "Guybo" (Capehart/Cochran)
13. "Long Tall Sally"

== Additional notes ==
Catalogue: (LP) Liberty 1205.
