= Eddie Cochran: Don't Forget Me =

2026 documentary film

- Theatrical release poster
- Directed by: Kirsty Bell
- Produced by: Ben Charles Edwards
- Edited by: Brad Watson
- Production company: Goldfinch
- Release date: June 26, 2026 (United States)
- Running time: 95 minutes
- Country: United Kingdom
- Language: English

Eddie Cochran: Don't Forget Me is a 2026 British drama-documentary film directed by Kirsty Bell, about the life of Eddie Cochran. The film combines contemporary interviews with dramatised scenes from Cochran's life, starring Jack Harris and Frances Barber.

== Cast ==
=== Dramatisation ===
- Jack Harris as Eddie Cochran
- Frances Barber as Alice Cochran

=== Interviewees (alphabetical) ===
- Tim Burgess
- Simone Marie Butler
- Eddie Cochran (archive)
- Alice Cooper
- Maxwell D.
- Roger Daltrey
- BP Fallon
- Peter Frampton
- Greg Harris
- Darrel Higham
- Billy Idol
- Karim Kamar
- Camille Koefoed
- Nick Moran
- Linda Perry
- Suzi Quatro
- Mike Read
- Tim Rice
- Cliff Richard
- Keith Richards
- Stephen Sanchez
- Brian Setzer
- Brix Smith-Start
- Rod Stewart
- Sting
- Kiefer Sutherland
- John Waters
- Marty Wilde
- Ronnie Wood
- Yungblud

== Release ==
The film premiered at the 2026 Raindance Film Festival.

== Reception ==
In The Guardian Leslie Felperin gave the film 3/5 stars, writing: "Director Kirsty Bell alternates archival footage with tacky dramatised filler, but it’s the breadth of appreciation, from Keith Richards to Kiefer Sutherland that impresses. ... [The film] is stretched so thin to make a feature-length running time you can practically see through the screen."

Martin Robinson in the London Evening Standard gave 4/5 stars, writing: "This is a documentary on a mission – to bolster Eddie Cochran against the tides of time and honour his request: 'Don’t Forget Me' was a phrase he’d write next to his autograph. ... The sheer enthusiasm of [the interviewees] makes the film work and there’s an extra edge of accomplishment about it. ... And more than anything else, his songs are so great they demand to be heard over and over. I would defy anyone not to be a huge Eddie Cochran fan after seeing this film."
