= Cut Across Shorty =

1960 single by Eddie Cochran

Single by Eddie Cochran

from the album The Eddie Cochran Memorial Album
- A-side: "Three Steps to Heaven"
- Released: March 1960
- Genre: Rock and roll, country, bluegrass
- Length: 1:37
- Label: Liberty 55242
- Songwriters: Marijohn Wilkin, Wayne P. Walker
- Producer: Snuff Garrett

Eddie Cochran singles chronology
"Hallelujah, I Love Her So" (1959)	"Cut Across Shorty" (1960)	"Lonely" (1960)

"Cut Across Shorty" is a song written by Marijohn Wilkin and Wayne P. Walker, originally released and made popular by Eddie Cochran. It was the B-side of his number 1 UK hit "Three Steps to Heaven" and the last song he ever recorded.

== Personnel ==
- Eddie Cochran: vocal and rhythm guitar
- Sonny Curtis: guitar
- Conrad 'Guybo' Smith: electric bass
- Jerry Allison: drums

== Johnny Hallyday version (in French) ==
"Cours plus vite Charlie"

Single by Johnny Hallyday

from the album Rêve et Amour
- Language: French
- English title: Run Faster, Charlie
- B-side: "J'ai peur, je t'aime"
- Released: October 18, 1968
- Recorded: March 1968
- Studio: Olympic Studios, London
- Genre: Rock and roll
- Length: 2:22
- Label: Philips
- Songwriters: Marijohn Wilkin, Wayne P. Walker; Long Chris (French lyrics)
- Producer: Lee Hallyday

Johnny Hallyday singles chronology
"Le ciel nous fait rêver" (1968)	"Cours plus vite Charlie" (1968)	"Je suis l'amour" (1969)

The song was covered in French by Johnny Hallyday. His version (titled "Cours plus vite Charlie", meaning "Run Faster, Charlie") was released in October 1968 and spent two weeks at no. 1 on the singles sales chart in France (from 9 to 20 November). In Wallonia (French Belgium) his single spent 18 weeks on the chart, peaking at number 9.

== Track listing ==
7" single Philips B 370 743 F (France, etc.)

A. "Cours plus vite Charlie" ("Cut Across Shorty") (2:22)
B. "J'ai peur je t'aime" (2:43)

=== Charts ===
Chart (1968)	Peak position
Belgium (Ultratop 50 Wallonia)	9
France (singles sales)	1

== Rod Stewart version ==
"Cut Across Shorty" was also recorded by Rod Stewart for his 1970 album Gasoline Alley, with Ronnie Wood playing several instruments. In 1993, Stewart reunited with Wood for a session of MTV Unplugged. During the session they recorded a version of "Cut Across Shorty" which was included on the album Unplugged...and Seated.

== Other versions ==
- Carl Smith 1960 (#28 country)
- Freddie and the Dreamers October 1964
- Nat Stuckey 1969 (#15 country)
- Rod Stewart 1970; a 1993 live single went to #16 on the US rock charts
- Faces 1974
- Mud 1978
- The Head Cat 2006
- The 99ers 2012
