= Go, Johnny, Go! =

- Theatrical release poster by Tom Jung
- Directed by: Paul Landres; Piero Vivarelli
- Written by: Gary Alexander
- Produced by: Hal Roach, Jr.
- Starring: Alan Freed; Jimmy Clanton; Sandy Stewart; Chuck Berry; Adriano Celentano; Piero Vivarelli; Ritchie Valens
- Cinematography: Jack Etra
- Edited by: Walter A. Hannemann
- Music by: Leon Klatzkin
- Production company: Hal Roach Studios
- Distributed by: Valiant Films
- Release date: April 1959
- Running time: 75 minutes
- Country: United States
- Language: English

Go, Johnny, Go! is a 1959 rock and roll film starring Alan Freed as a talent scout searching for a future rock and roll star. Co-starring in the film are Jimmy Clanton, Sandy Stewart, and Chuck Berry. The film has also been released as Johnny Melody, The Swinging Story and The Swinging Story of Johnny Melody.

== Plot summary ==
Chuck Berry performs "Johnny B. Goode" over the opening titles. We meet a young singer (Jimmy Clanton) who goes by the stage name of Johnny Melody. After a few opening performances, Berry and Alan Freed (playing themselves) discuss their discovery of Johnny, whose fate once hinged on the toss of a coin, with Freed intimating that Johnny nearly ended-up in jail. Berry demands to know the rest of the story.

Alan relates that Johnny was once a choir boy from an orphanage. After a practice, the choir director expresses his contempt for rock and roll and leaves. A moment later, he returns to find the kids performing "Ship On A Stormy Sea" with Johnny, who has no last name, in the lead. He stops the song and says that he'll call the other kids' parents, but since Johnny has no parents, he is dismissed and will be sent back to the orphanage. Instead, he gets a job as an usher in a theater, but is fired on his first day for dancing in the aisle to Jo Ann Campbell's "Mama Can I Go Out". During the performance, Alan Freed announces a talent search for a singer to be renamed "Johnny Melody".

At the theater door, Johnny meets his old friend from the orphanage, Julie Arnold (Sandy Stewart). She wants him to call her to re-connect, but he tells her he has no money for dates and is saving to record a demo record. Freed then tells Johnny that the talent search was only a publicity stunt by his agent.

At a recording studio, Julie records a demo of "Playmates". On her way out, she meets Johnny again, and sings back-up on his recording of "My Love Is Strong". The record is one of many sent to Freed, but Berry, hearing something special in it, urges that it be given strong consideration. But Johnny has failed to include contact information, and his subsequent call to Freed's office fails to get through.

Johnny and Julie begin to fall in love, and he wants to get her a special pin for Christmas. After pawning his trumpet, he still doesn't have enough, and he determines to break the jewelry store window with a brick. In the meantime, Freed has begun playing Johnny's record on his radio show to overwhelming response, and has started a public search for Johnny. After hearing the show, Julie rouses Freed and they trail Johnny to the area of the jewelry store, at one point flipping a coin to decide in which direction to look. They find Johnny just as he throws the brick. Freed sends Johnny away with Julie and diverts the police by pretending to be a drunk who tossed the brick.

This brings us back to present, and Johnny and Julie are married.

== Cast ==
- Alan Freed as himself
- Jimmy Clanton as Johnny Melody
- Sandy Stewart as Julie Arnold
- Chuck Berry as himself
- Herb Vigran as Bill Barnett
- Frank Wilcox as Mr. Arnold
- Barbara Wooddell as Mrs. Arnold
- Ritchie Valens as himself
- Eddie Cochran as himself
- Jackie Wilson as himself
- Harvey Fuqua as himself
- Jo Ann Campbell as herself
- Milton Frome as Mr. Martin
- Adriano Celentano as himself (Italian version)
- Piero Vivarelli as TV director (Italian version)
- Joe Cranston as Band leader
- Martha Wentworth as Mrs. McGillacudy, Johnny's landlady
- Robert Foulk as Policeman at jewelry store
- Phil Arnold as Stagehand
- William Fawcett as Janitor at radio station
- Dick Elliott as Man waiting for the telephone
- Inga Boling as Secretary
- Joe Flynn as Usher who fires Johnny

Jazz legend Dave Brubeck appears uncredited as the piano player backing Chuck Berry when he sings "Little Queenie".

Cast notes

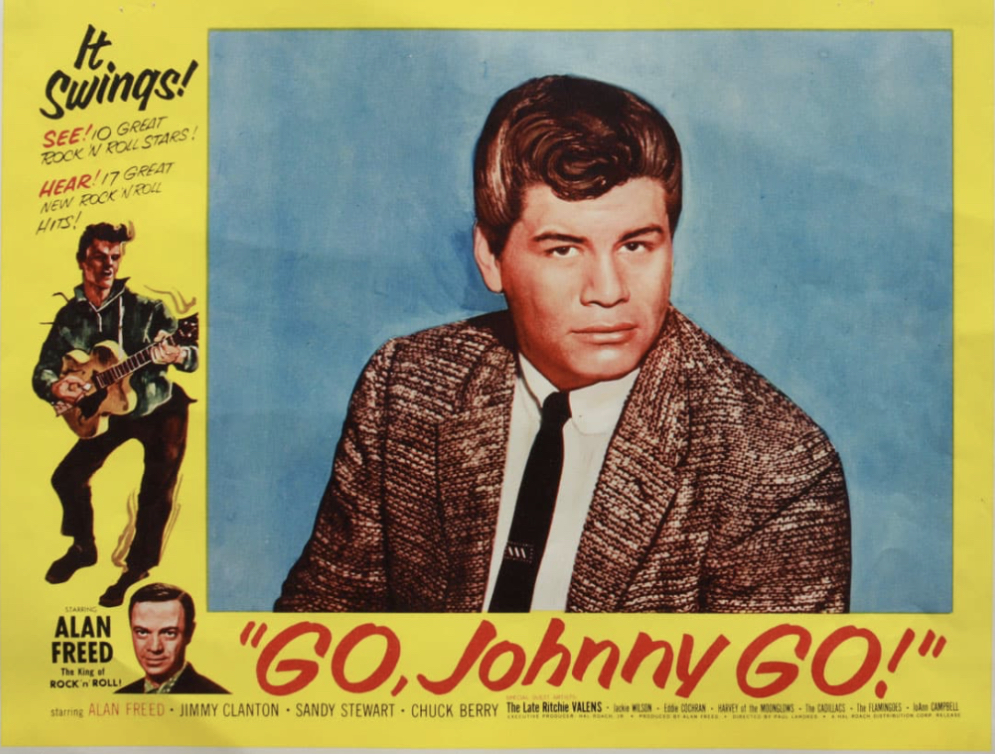
A theatrical release poster for Go, Johnny, Go! highlighting Ritchie Valens' role in the movie by prominently showing his photograph (by far the largest section in the poster), listing his name in the cast as "The Late Ritchie Valens" as a mark of respect in the manner deceased persons are traditionally referred to (as Valens died before the movie was released) and displaying that name in bold font to make it more prominent

- Jimmy Clanton' was involved in the music scene of New Orleans. The first single he released, "Just a Dream", was recorded with the assistance of studio musicians such as Mac Rebennack ("Dr. John, the Night Tripper") and Allen Toussaint. Rebennack would have a top 10 hit on the Billboard charts with "Right Place, Wrong Time" in 1973. The recording session for "Just a Dream" was among the early sessions that Toussaint participated.
- Go, Johnny Go! was the only film appearance of Ritchie Valens, who died shortly after filming it in a plane crash, along with Buddy Holly and The Big Bopper. The film was released after Valens' death.
- Go, Johnny Go! was Eddie Cochran's third and final appearance in a major picture. A second song, "I Remember", was filmed but cut from the final print.

== Songs ==
1. "Go, Johnny Go!" (Johnny B. Goode) – Chuck Berry
2. "It Takes A Long, Long Time" – Jimmy Clanton
3. "Jump Children" – The Flamingos
4. "Angel Face" – Jimmy Clanton
5. "Don't Be Afraid To Love" – Harvey
6. "Mama Can I Go Out" – Jo Ann Campbell
7. "Teenage Heaven" – Eddie Cochran
8. "Playmates" – Sandy Stewart
9. "My Love Is Strong" – Jimmy Clanton
10. "Memphis, Tennessee" – Chuck Berry
11. "Jay Walker" – The Cadillacs
12. "You Better Know It" – Jackie Wilson
13. "Please Mr. Johnson" – The Cadillacs
14. "Heavenly Father" – Sandy Stewart
15. "Little Queenie" – Chuck Berry
16. "Ooh My Head" – Ritchie Valens
17. "Ship On A Stormy Sea" – Jimmy Clanton

== Production ==
Go, Johnny Go! was filmed in 1-week over five days starting Monday morning January 5, 1959, at the Culver City, California studios of Hal Roach Productions.
