= Never to Be Forgotten =

Compilation album by Eddie Cochran
- Released: January 1962
- Genre: Rock and roll
- Label: Liberty

Eddie Cochran chronology
The Eddie Cochran Memorial Album (1960)	Never to Be Forgotten (1962)	Cherished Memories (1962)

Singles from Never Forgotten
- 1. "Lonely" Released: August 1960; 2. "Weekend" Released: December 1961

Professional ratings
Review scores
Source	Rating
Allmusic	2012
Rate Your Music	Rate Your Music 2013

Never to Be Forgotten is the third album by Eddie Cochran and the second album posthumously released in the US after Cochran's death in 1960.

== Content ==
The album was released by Liberty Records in January 1962 with catalogue number LRP 3220.

== Cover versions ==
"Nervous Breakdown" was covered by Prism for their 2008 album Big Black Sky and by Wanda Jackson for her 2011 album The Party Ain't Over.

== Track listing ==
Side one

1. "Weekend" (Bill Post / Doree Post)
2. "Long Tall Sally" (Robert "Bumps" Blackwell / Enotris Johnson / Little Richard)
3. "Lonely" (Sharon Sheeley)
4. "Nervous Breakdown" (Eddie Cochran)
5. "Cherished Memories" (Sharon Sheeley)
6. "Twenty Flight Rock" (Eddie Cochran / Ned Fairchild)

Side two

1. "Boll Weevil Song" (Traditional; Arranged and adapted by Jerry Capehart / Eddie Cochran)
2. "Little Angel" (H. Winn / Hal Winn)
3. "Milk Cow Blues" (Kokomo Arnold)
4. "Sweetie Pie" (Jerry Capehart / Eddie Cochran)
5. "Love Again" (Sharon Sheeley)
6. "Blue Suede Shoes" (Carl Perkins)
