= Lulu Belle and Scotty =

American country music duo

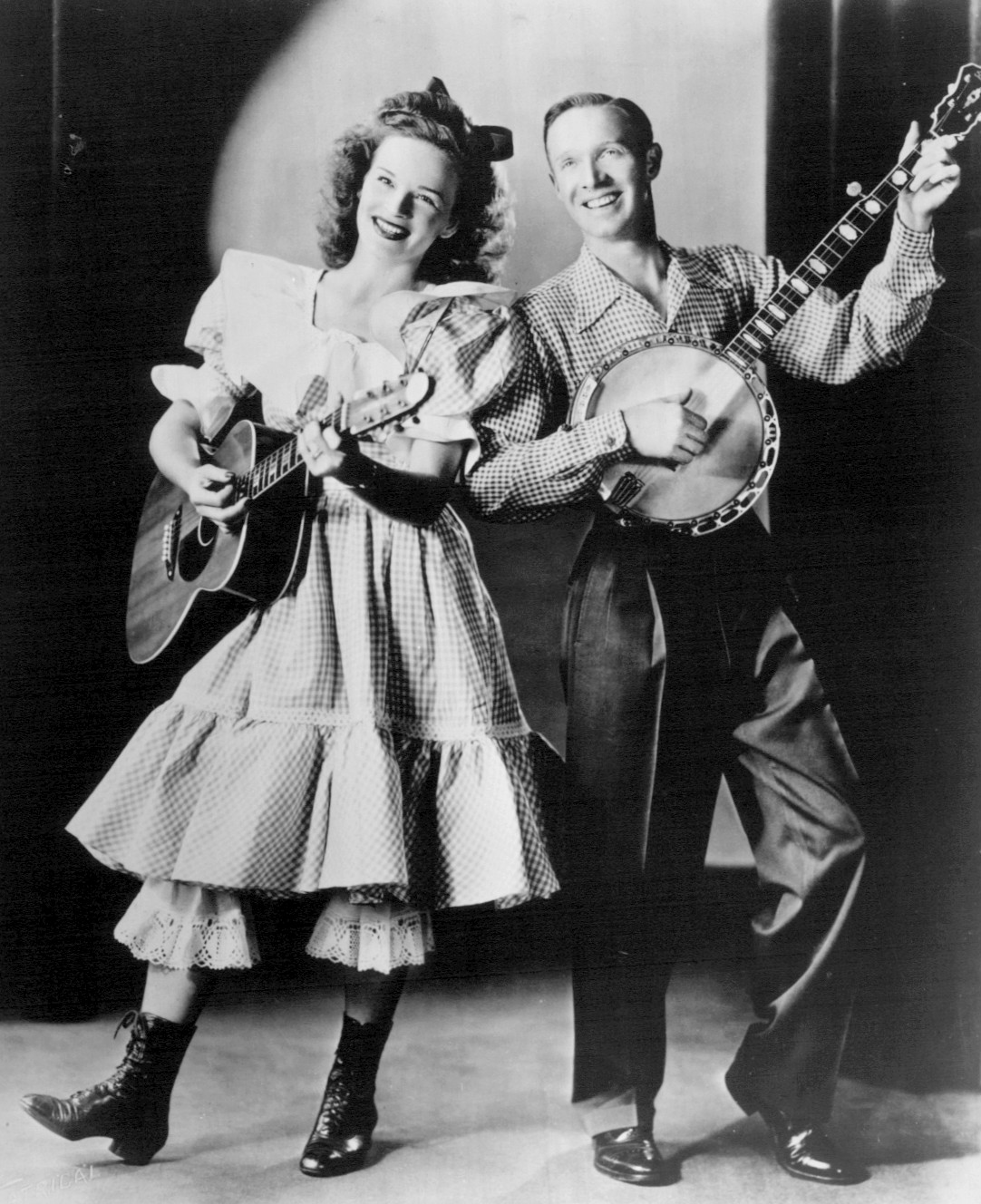
Lulu Belle and Scotty in 1949

Myrtle Eleanor Cooper (December 24, 1913 – February 8, 1999) and Scott Greene Wiseman (November 8, 1909 – January 31, 1981), known professionally as Lulu Belle and Scotty, were one of the major country music acts of the 1930s and 1940s, dubbed The Sweethearts of Country Music.

== Career ==
Myrtle Eleanor Cooper (Lulu Belle) was born in Boone, North Carolina, United States; Wiseman was from Spruce Pine, North Carolina. Lulu Belle and Scotty enjoyed enormous national popularity thanks to their regular appearances on National Barn Dance on WLS-AM in Chicago, a rival to WSM-AM's Grand Ole Opry. Barn Dance enjoyed a large radio audience in the 1930s and early 1940s with some 20 million Americans regularly tuning in.

The duo married on December 13, 1934, one year after Wiseman became a regular on Barn Dance (Cooper had been a solo performer there since 1932). The duo is best known for their self-penned classic "Have I Told You Lately That I Love You?", which became one of the first country songs to attract major attention in pop circles, and was recorded by many artists in both genres. Cooper was the somewhat dominant half of the duo with a comic persona as a wisecracking country girl. Her most famous novelty number was "Daffy Over Taffy". In 1938, she was named Favorite Female Radio Star by the readers of Radio Guide magazine, an unusual recognition for a country performer.

Lulu Belle and Scotty recorded for record labels including Vocalion Records, Columbia Records, Bluebird Records; and Starday Records, in their final sessions during the 1960s reprising their old hits. They were among the first country music stars to venture into feature motion pictures, appearing in such films as Village Barn Dance (1940), Shine On, Harvest Moon (1938), County Fair (1941) and The National Barn Dance (1944).

The couple retired from show business in 1958, except occasional appearances, going on to new careers in teaching (Wiseman) and politics (Cooper). Cooper served two terms from 1975 to 1978 in the North Carolina House of Representatives as the Democratic representative for three counties. In 1977, she gave a memorable speech in which she revealed that she had been raped on the country music circuit.

Scotty Wiseman was inducted into the Nashville Songwriters Hall of Fame in 1971. After his death in 1981 from a heart attack in Gainesville, Florida, Cooper married Ernest Stamey in 1983; and in 1989 recorded her first album in 20 years for a small traditional music label, Mar-lu Records out of Portageville, Missouri.

Myrtle Stamey died in Spruce Pine, North Carolina, aged 85. In 1999, Old Homestead Records released a retrospective album Early & Great.
