= Teenage Heaven =

Single by Eddie Cochran

from the album The Eddie Cochran Memorial Album
- B-side: "I Remember"
- Released: February 1959
- Recorded: January 1959
- Genre: Rock and roll
- Label: Liberty 55177
- Songwriter(s): Eddie Cochran; Jerry Capehart
- Producer(s): Eddie Cochran

Eddie Cochran singles chronology
"C'mon Everybody" (1958)	"Teenage Heaven" (1959)	"Somethin' Else" (1959)

"Teenage Heaven" is a 1959 song by Eddie Cochran and Jerry Capehart. It was the A-side of Liberty F-55177 and was featured in the 1959 film Go, Johnny Go!. This single rose to number 99 on the Billboard charts. The B-side's "I Remember" was also recorded and filmed for the movie but was left out. It would be Cochran's last charting single during his lifetime.

== Personnel ==
- Eddie Cochran: vocal, guitar
- Don Myers: electric bass
- Gene Riggio: drums
- Jim Stivers: piano
- Plas Johnson: tenor saxophone
- Earl Palmer: drums

== Chart performance ==
Chart (1959)	Peak position
US Billboard Hot 100	99
