= Three Steps to Heaven (song) =

Single by Eddie Cochran

from the album The Eddie Cochran Memorial Album
- B-side: "Cut Across Shorty"
- Released: March 1960 (USA); May 1960 (UK)
- Recorded: January 8, 1960, Gold Star Studios, Hollywood, California
- Genre: Rock and roll, doo-wop, pop, country
- Length: 2:21
- Label: Liberty 55242 (USA); London HLG 9115 (UK)
- Songwriters: Eddie Cochran; Bob Cochran
- Producer: Snuff Garrett

Eddie Cochran singles chronology
"Hallelujah, I Love Her So" (1959)	"Three Steps to Heaven" (1960)	"Lonely" (1960)

"Three Steps to Heaven" is a song co-written and recorded by Eddie Cochran, released in 1960. The record topped the charts in the Republic of Ireland and the United Kingdom posthumously for Cochran following his death in a car accident in April 1960. In the US it did not reach the Billboard Hot 100.

"Three Steps To Heaven" was recorded in January 1960 and featured Buddy Holly's Crickets on instruments. The song was written by Eddie Cochran and his brother Bob Cochran.

David Bowie used the guitar chord riff in his 1971 song "Queen Bitch" on his album Hunky Dory. He later made reference to the song title in the lyrics of "It's No Game" on 1980's Scary Monsters (And Super Creeps).

The Police released a recording of the song in 2024.

== Lyrics ==
The lyrics outline a "formula for heaven" in three steps:

Step one, you find a girl to love
Step two, she falls in love with you
Step three, you kiss and hold her tightly
Yeah, that sure seems like heaven to me.

== Personnel ==
- Eddie Cochran: vocal and rhythm guitar
- Sonny Curtis: guitar
- Conrad 'Guybo' Smith: electric bass
- Jerry Allison: drums

== Chart performance ==
Chart (1960)	Peak position
Ireland Singles Chart	1
Netherlands Singles Chart	10
New Zealand Singles Chart	6
Norway Singles Chart	7
South African Singles Chart	5
UK Singles Chart	1

== Cover versions ==
Showaddywaddy's 1975 cover version of this song was also a hit, reaching No. 1 in Ireland and No. 2 in the UK Singles Chart.

The Police recorded a version which was released in 2024 on the Synchronicity box set collection.

P.J. Proby recorded it in 2010, as did Keld Heick, Daniel O'Donnell on The Jukebox Years album in 2004, John Spencer, Benny Scott, Foster and Allen, Paul Michiels, Ricky Norton in 1997, Heinz in 1963, and Jerry Williams in 1974.

== Memorial ==
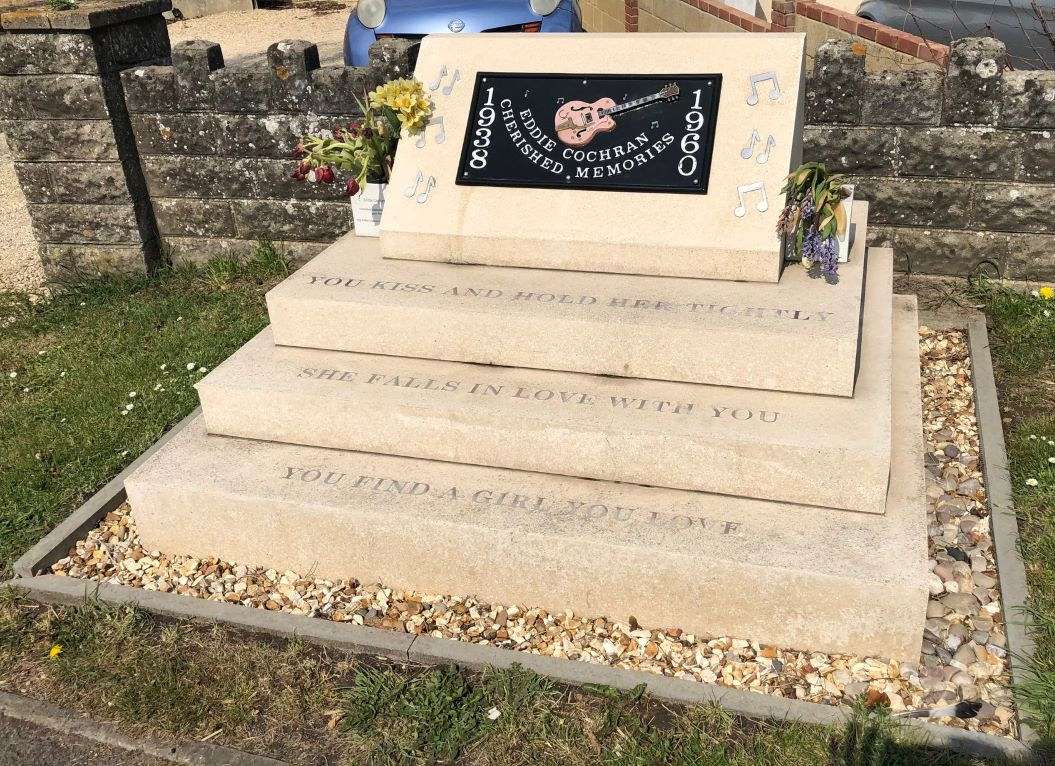
"Three Steps" memorial, Rowden Hill, Chippenham

On April 16, 1960, Cochran, along with his friend Gene Vincent, tour manager Patrick Tompkins, and songwriter Sharon Sheeley, were involved in a high-speed traffic accident at Rowden Hill, Chippenham, Wiltshire, England. All four were badly injured, but Cochran sustained the most serious injuries, and died in hospital the following day. The accident occurred a month after "Three Steps to Heaven" had been released in the US, but before it had been released in the UK. In 1990 a memorial plaque was erected at the site of the accident, and in 2018 this was re-set in a larger monument composed of three steps, each inscribed with lyrics from the song.

== See also ==
- List of posthumous number-one singles (UK)
