= Lonely (Eddie Cochran song) =

- UK 45 single release on London Records.

Single by Eddie Cochran

from the album Never to Be Forgotten
- B-side: "Sweetie Pie"
- Released: August 1960
- Recorded: May 1958
- Genre: Doo-wop
- Label: Liberty 55278
- Songwriter: Sharon Sheeley
- Producer: Eddie Cochran

Eddie Cochran singles chronology
| "Three Steps to Heaven" (1960) | "Lonely" (1960) | "Weekend" (1960) |

"Lonely" is a song written by Sharon Sheeley and recorded by Eddie Cochran. It was recorded in May 1958 and released posthumously as a single on Liberty F-55278 in August 1960. In the UK the single rose to number 41 on the charts. The U.S. release did not chart. The flip side, "Sweetie Pie", reached number 38 on the UK Singles chart.

== Personnel ==
- Eddie Cochran: vocal, guitar
- Conrad 'Guybo' Smith: electric bass
- Unidentified: drums

== Chart performance ==
| Chart (1960) | Peak position |
|---|---|
| UK Singles Chart | 41 |

== Cover version ==
In 1982 Austrian band Drahdiwaberl - also famous for recording Falco's first hit Ganz Wien - recorded a cover version of Lonely together with comedic artist Lukas Resetarits. It was by far their biggest hit and reached number four on the Austrian singles chart in early 1983.
