= Weekend (Eddie Cochran song) =

- UK 45 release on London Records

Single by Eddie Cochran

from the album Never to Be Forgotten
- B-side: "Lonely"
- Released: December 1961
- Recorded: April 1959
- Genre: Rock and roll, rockabilly
- Label: London HLG 9362 in the UK; Liberty 55389 in US;
- Songwriter(s): Bill Post; Doree Post

Eddie Cochran singles chronology
"Lonely" (1960)	"Weekend" (1961)

"Weekend" is a song recorded by Eddie Cochran. The song was written by Bill and Doree Post and recorded in April 1959.

== Background ==
The song was released posthumously as a single in the UK on London Records as 45-HLG 9362 in June 1961 and rose to number 15 on the charts. In the US it was released on Liberty Records as 55389 in December 1961 and did not chart. The song was published by Cross Music in the UK. This was the last single with original material by Eddie Cochran released in the US.

== Personnel ==
- Eddie Cochran - vocals, guitar
- Conrad "Guybo" Smith or Dave Shriver - electric bass
- Gene Riggio - drums

== Chart performance ==
Chart (1960)	Peak position
UK Singles Chart	15

== Cover versions ==
The song was covered in 1968 by The Move and appears on their eponymous album, released on the 22nd of March that year. The song was also recorded by Bobby Vee in 1965, Showaddywaddy in 1981, Alvin Stardust in 1982, Teenage Head in 1985, and Darrel Higham in 2004.
