= Perry Botkin =

American jazz musician and composer (1907–1973)

- Born: July 22, 1907; Springfield, Ohio, U.S.
- Died: October 14, 1973 (aged 66); Van Nuys, California, U.S.
- Occupation: Musician

Perry Botkin (July 22, 1907 – October 14, 1973) was an American jazz guitarist, banjoist, and composer.

== Career ==
Born in Springfield, Ohio, Perry Botkin started working in the 1920s for Wayne Euchner, who had a big band in West Baden, Indiana. Around 1928 he worked with Phil Napoleon's Original Memphis Five. Later he played the guitar on Hoagy Carmichael's Hong Kong Blues. He also recorded with Al Jolson, Buddy Cole Trio, Connee Boswell, Eddie Cantor, Glenn Miller, Benny Goodman, Paul Whiteman, Bob Hope, Fred Astaire, Spike Jones, Roy Rogers, and The Dorsey Brothers.

The single The Executioner Theme from the film Murder by Contract reached number 39 on Canada's CHUM Chart.

For 17 years he worked as musical director for Bing Crosby. He appeared as a musician in The Adventures of Ozzie and Harriet (1956-1957). In 1958 he composed the score for Murder by Contract, and in the 1960s he composed many songs for The Beverly Hillbillies, e.g. "Elly May's Theme". His son, Perry Botkin Jr., was also a musician and composer.

Perry Botkin died in Van Nuys, California at the age of 66.

== Discography ==
- The World Is Waiting for the Sunrise (Decca, 1951)
