= Sittin' in the Balcony =

"Sittin' in the Balcony" is a song written and performed by John D. Loudermilk under his artist name Johnny Dee. It was released in January 1957 on the Colonial Records label. Eddie Cochran had a Top 20 hit in the U.S. with his recording on Liberty Records in 1957.

== Eddie Cochran version ==
"Sittin' in the Balcony"

Single by Eddie Cochran

from the album Singin' to My Baby
- B-side: "Dark Lonely Street"
- Released: 1957
- Recorded: January 1957, Gold Star Studios
- Genre: Rockabilly
- Length: 2:05
- Label: Liberty
- Songwriter(s): Johnny Dee

Eddie Cochran singles chronology
"Skinny Jim" (1956)	"Sittin' in the Balcony" (1957)	"One Kiss" (1957)

Professional ratings
Review scores
Source	Rating
Rate Your Music	3.3/5 stars

"Sittin' in the Balcony" is a song performed by Eddie Cochran and released on single by Liberty Records in January 1957. It rose to number 18 on the Billboard charts by April of that year. Cochran lip-synched to the song on the Saturday Night Beechnut Show hosted by Dick Clark. It appeared on his 1957 Liberty Records album Singin' To My Baby.

=== Chart performance ===
Chart (1957)	Peak position
Canadian Singles Chart	23
US Billboard Top 100	18
U.S. Billboard Most Played R&B by Jockeys	7

== Other notable versions ==
- Don McLean (1989)
- Keld Heick (2010)
