= Hallelujah I Love Her So =

1956 single by Ray Charles

- 1968 French re-release

Single by Ray Charles

from the album Ray Charles (or, Hallelujah I Love Her So)
- B-side: "What Would I Do Without You"
- Released: May 1956
- Recorded: November 30, 1955
- Genre: Soul; R&B
- Length: 2:35
- Label: Atlantic
- Songwriter: Ray Charles
- Producer: Jerry Wexler

Ray Charles singles chronology
"Drown in My Own Tears" (1955)	"Hallelujah I Love Her So" (1956)	"Lonely Avenue" (1956)

"Hallelujah I Love Her So" is a single by American musician Ray Charles. The rhythm and blues song was written and released by Charles in 1956 on the Atlantic label, and in 1957 it was included on his self-titled debut LP, also released on Atlantic. The song peaked at number five on the Billboard R&B chart. It is loosely based on 'Get It Over Baby' by Ike Turner (1953).

The song features a horn arrangement and tenor saxophone solo by Don Wilkerson. Several artists, including Stevie Wonder, The Kim Sisters, Peggy Lee, Eddie Cochran, and Humble Pie have covered the song.

== Personnel ==
- Ray Charles – lead vocal
- Don Wilkerson – tenor saxophone solo
- The Ray Charles Orchestra – instrumentation
- Jerry Wexler – producer

== Eddie Cochran version ==
"Hallelujah, I Love Her So"

Single by Eddie Cochran

from the album The Eddie Cochran Memorial Album
- B-side: "Little Angel"
- Released: November 1959
- Recorded: August 31, 1959
- Genre: Rock 'n' roll
- Label: Liberty F-55217
- Songwriter: Ray Charles
- Producer: Eddie Cochran

Eddie Cochran singles chronology
"Somethin' Else" (1959)	"Hallelujah, I Love Her So" (1959)	"Three Steps to Heaven" (1960)

"Hallelujah, I Love Her So" was adapted by Eddie Cochran. It was released as a single on Liberty Records in November 1959.

== Beatles cover versions ==
"Hallelujah I Love Her So"

Song by the Beatles (then known as the Quarrymen)

from the album Anthology 1
- Released: November 20, 1995
- Recorded: July 1960
- Studio: 20 Forthlin Road, Liverpool
- Genre: Rhythm and blues
- Length: 1:13
- Songwriter: Ray Charles

According to biographer Mark Lewisohn (in The Complete Beatles Chronicle, p. 362), the Beatles (first as the Quarrymen) regularly performed the song, from at least 1960 through 1962 with Paul McCartney on lead vocal. A very early home recording rehearsal (dated tentatively to May 1960) of it was included on Anthology 1 as well as on previous unauthorized releases. They continued playing it regularly including at The Star-Club in Hamburg through the end of 1962, an audience recording was made there which is included in the album Live! at the Star-Club in Hamburg, Germany; 1962. Tony Sheridan recorded the song with his back-up group The Beat Brothers, long after his recording session with The Beatles in 1961. It was released on Sheridan's album My Bonnie (1962) which included a few of the songs he recorded previously with The Beatles in 1961. Additionally, according to author Doug Sulpy (in Drugs, Divorce And A Slipping Image, sec. 22.25) on January 22, 1969, during the Get Back sessions, they recorded a version with John Lennon doing a "loose" lead vocal; that version has never been officially released.

=== Personnel ===
The Quarrymen, Paul's home, 1960

- Paul McCartney - vocals, guitar
- John Lennon - guitar
- George Harrison - guitar
- Stuart Sutcliffe - bass

The Beatles, Star-Club recording, December 1962

- Horst Fascher (Star-Club manager) - Guest lead vocal
- John Lennon - guitar
- George Harrison - guitar
- Paul McCartney - bass
- Ringo Starr - drums

== Personnel ==
- Eddie Cochran: vocal, guitar
- Jimmy Stivers: piano
- Gene Riggio: drums
- Don Myers: electric bass
- Mike Henderson: tenor sax
- Mike Deasy: baritone sax

=== Chart performance ===
Chart (1960)	Peak position
UK Singles Chart	22

== George Jones and Brenda Lee version ==
George Jones covered the song on his 1984 album Ladies' Choice as a duet with Brenda Lee titled "Hallelujah, I Love You So". It was released as a single in 1984 and peaked at number 15 on the Billboard Hot Country Singles chart in 1985.

=== Chart performance ===
Chart (1984–1985)	Peak position
US Billboard Hot Country Singles	15
Canada RPM Country Tracks	13
