= Jerry Capehart =

American songwriter (1928–1998)

- Born: August 22, 1928; Goodman, Missouri, U.S.
- Died: June 7, 1998 (aged 69) Nashville, Tennessee, U.S.
- Genres: Rock and roll
- Occupations: Songwriter; music manager

Jerry Neil Capehart (August 22, 1928 – June 7, 1998) was an American songwriter and music manager. Capehart co-wrote the songs "Summertime Blues" and "C'mon Everybody" with Eddie Cochran, whom he also managed. One of his most-recorded songs, "Turn Around, Look at Me," was a chart hit for Glen Campbell (his first), the Lettermen, and the Vogues.

== Career ==
Eddie Cochran's 1958 recordings of Capehart compositions reached No. 8 and No. 35 respectively on the Billboard pop chart. Besides managing Cochran, Capehart was manager for actor and impressionist Frank Gorshin and vocalists Rosemary Clooney and Glen Campbell, among others. Other notable songs written by Capehart are "Beautiful Brown Eyes" recorded by Rosemary Clooney which reached No. 11 on Billboard Pop chart in 1951 and "Turn Around, Look at Me", which was Glen Campbell's first hit single, peaking at No. 15 on Billboard Adult Contemporary chart in 1961, followed by The Vogues recording which made No. 7 on the Hot 100 during 1968-1969. He also contributed music to the 1963 film Shotgun Wedding starring Jenny Maxwell.

In 1994, country music artist Alan Jackson scored a No. 1 hit with his recording of "Summertime Blues".

Capehart died in Nashville June 7, 1998. He had been in Nashville pitching a new song "Summertime Blues No. 2", to record labels on Music Row. Capehart wrote more than 100 songs during his career.

== Death ==
He died at the age of 69 from brain cancer in Nashville, Tennessee.

== Discography ==
- "Rollin'" b/w "Walkin' Stick Boogie" (CASH 1021, 1956) released as by Jerry Capehart Featuring The Cochran Brothers
- "I Hates Rabbits" b/w "Scratchin'" (Dot 15810, 1958) released as by Jerry Neal
- "Song Of New Orleans" b/w "The Theme For The Young And The Blue" (Crest 1101, 1962)
- "Love On The Run" b/w "I Remember Love" (Liberty 55657, 1964) released as by Jerry Berryhill
- "Lemon Pie" b/w "Midnight In The Afternoon" (Liberty 55825, 1964) released as by Jerry Berryhill
