= Eddie Cochran =

American rock and roll pioneer (1938–1960)

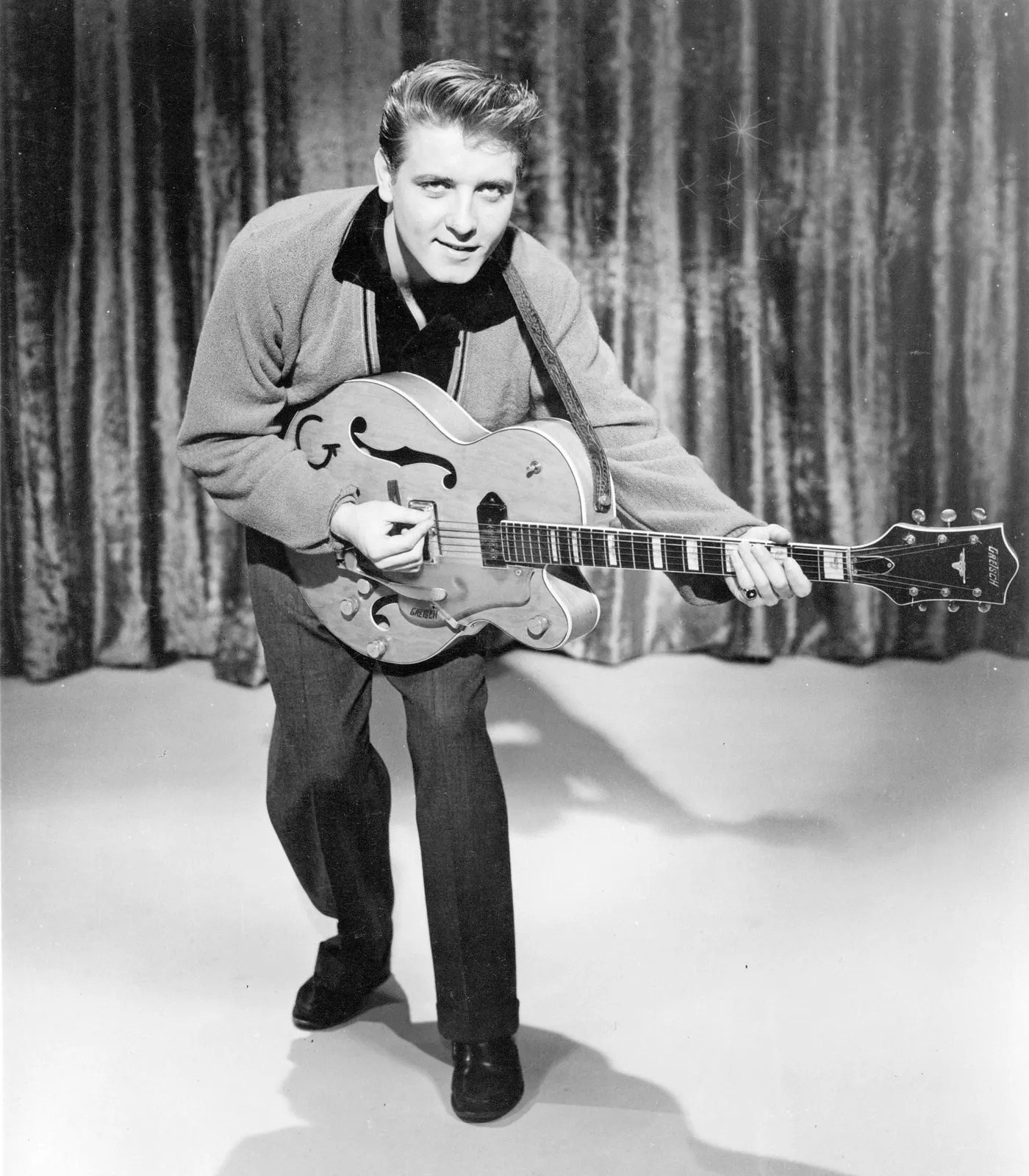
- Cochran in 1958

Background information
- Born: Edward Ray Cochran; October 3, 1938; Albert Lea, Minnesota, U.S.
- Died: April 17, 1960 (aged 21) Bath, Somerset, England
- Genres: Rock and roll; rockabilly; country; rhythm and blues
- Occupations: Musician; songwriter
- Instruments: Guitar; piano; bass guitar; drums; vocals
- Years active: 1950–1960
- Labels: Ekko; Crest; Liberty; London

Edward Ray Cochran (Note: While some sources list his name as Ray Edward Cochran or Edward Raymond Cochran, his death certificate records it as Edward Ray Cochran. His grave plaque, which reads "Edward R. Cochran", is compatible with this.) (/ˈkɒkrən/ KOK-rən; October 3, 1938 – April 17, 1960) was an American rock and roll musician. His songs, such as "Twenty Flight Rock", "Summertime Blues", "C'mon Everybody" and "Somethin' Else", captured teenage frustration and desire in the mid-1950s and early 1960s. He experimented with multitrack recording, distortion techniques and overdubbing, even on his earliest singles. Cochran played the guitar, piano, bass, and drums. His image as a sharply dressed and attractive young man with a rebellious attitude epitomized the stance of the 1950s rocker, and in death, he achieved iconic status.

Cochran was involved with music from an early age, playing in the school band and teaching himself to play blues guitar. In 1955, Cochran formed a duo with the guitarist Hank Cochran (no relation) and became known as the Cochran Brothers. When they split the following year, Eddie began a song-writing career with Jerry Capehart. His first success came when he performed "Twenty Flight Rock" in the film The Girl Can't Help It, which starred Jayne Mansfield. Soon afterward, he signed a recording contract with Liberty Records and his first record for the label, "Sittin' in the Balcony", rose to number 18 on the Billboard charts.

Cochran died in April 1960 in St Martin's Hospital, Bath, Somerset, after a car accident in Chippenham, Wiltshire, at the end of his British tour with Gene Vincent. On April 16, after they had just performed at the Bristol Hippodrome, and when they were on their way to Heathrow Airport to fly home, Vincent, Cochran, their tour manager Patrick Tompkins, and the songwriter Sharon Sheeley were involved in a high-speed traffic accident in a private-hire taxi. The other three passengers survived (albeit with significant injuries); but Cochran, who had been thrown from the vehicle, suffered more serious brain injuries and died the following day.

Though Cochran's best-known songs were released during his lifetime, more of his songs were released posthumously. In 1987, he was inducted into the Rock and Roll Hall of Fame. A wide variety of recording artists have recorded his songs. Paul McCartney performed "Twenty Flight Rock" in his audition for John Lennon's group the Quarrymen, and it won him a place; the Quarrymen later became the Beatles.

== Early life ==
Cochran was born on October 3, 1938, in Albert Lea, Minnesota, to Alice and Frank R. Cochran, natives of 'Oklahoma. He was of Scottish and English descent. Cochran took music lessons in school but quit the band to play drums. Additionally, rather than taking piano lessons, he began learning guitar, playing country and other music he heard on the radio.

In 1952, Cochran's family moved to Bell Gardens, California. As his guitar playing improved, Cochran formed a band with two friends from his junior high school. In January 1955, Cochran dropped out of Bell Gardens High School in his first year to become a professional musician.

== Career ==
=== The Cochran Brothers (1955–1956) ===
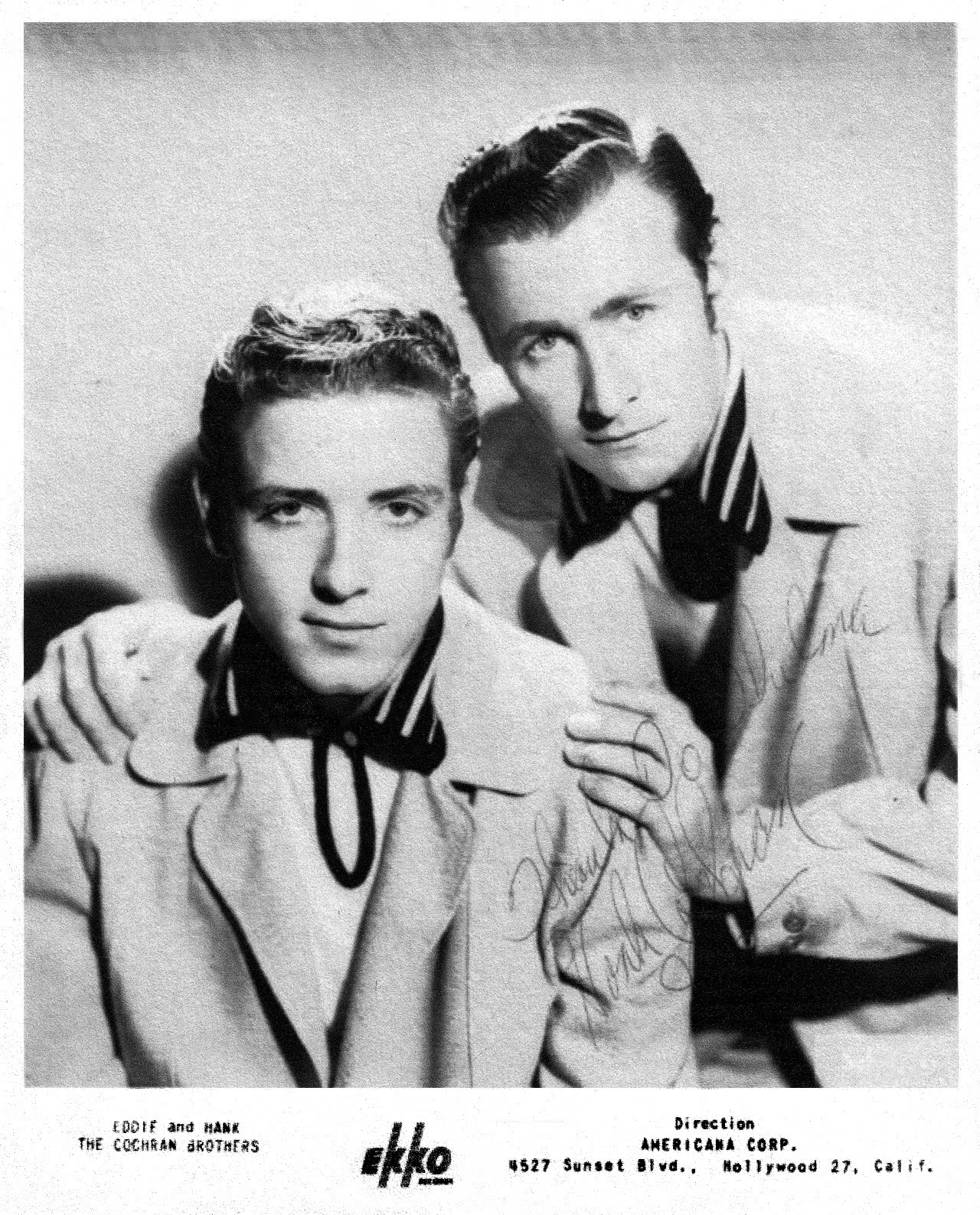
The Cochran Brothers

During a show featuring many performers at an American Legion hall, Cochran met the songwriter Hank Cochran. Although they were not related, they recorded as the Cochran Brothers and performed together. They recorded a few singles for Ekko Records that were fairly successful and helped to establish them as a performing act. Eddie Cochran also worked as a session musician and began writing songs, making a demo with Jerry Capehart, his future manager.

=== Solo and film appearances (1956–1959) ===
In July 1956, Eddie Cochran's first "solo artist" single was released by Crest Records. It featured "Skinny Jim", now regarded as a rock-and-roll and rockabilly classic. In the spring of 1956, Boris Petroff asked Cochran if he would appear in the musical comedy The Girl Can't Help It. Cochran agreed and performed "Twenty Flight Rock" in the movie. In 1957, Cochran starred in his second film, Untamed Youth (1957), for which he and Jerry Capehart co-wrote one of the songs from the movie, "Oo Ba La Baby", sung by co-star Mamie Van Doren, and had yet another hit, "Sittin' in the Balcony", one of the few songs he recorded that was written by other songwriters (in this case John D. Loudermilk). "Twenty Flight Rock" was written by AMI staff writer Ned Fairchild (a pen name—her real name is Nelda Fairchild). Fairchild, who was not a rock and roll performer, merely provided the initial form of the song; the co-writing credit reflects Cochran's major changes and contributions to the final product.

==== Singin' to My Baby (1957) ====
In the summer of 1957, Liberty Records issued Cochran's only studio album released during his lifetime, Singin' to My Baby. The album included John D. Loudermilk's "Sittin' in the Balcony". For the album, Cochran worked with manager and songwriter Jerry Capehart, and wrote the songs "Completely Sweet", "Undying Love", "When I'm Mad", and Cochran original "One Kiss".

In 1958, Cochran seemed to find his stride in the famous teenage anthem "Summertime Blues" (co-written with Jerry Capehart). With this song, Cochran was established as one of the most important influences on rock and roll in the 1950s, both lyrically and musically. The song, released by Liberty recording no. 55144, charted at number 8 in 1958.

Originally, Cochran toured with the Kelly Four as his backing band, guitarist Mike Deasy, saxophonist Mike Henderson, bassist Dave Shriver, and drummer Gene Riggio. They were known as the Hollywood Swingers, a reference to Dick D'Agostin's band. The line-up of Cochran's touring band would change over time, with saxophonist Jim Seals and bassist Connie 'Guybo' Smith, and the addition of pianist Jim Stivers. They were eventually joined by various members from Dick D'Agostin and The Swingers. In 1959, the Swingers line-up became muti-instrumentalist with pianist Dick D'Agostin, pianist Jim Stivers (briefly on bass), guitarist Larry D'Agostin, saxophonist Paul Kaufman, and drummer Gene Riggio. However, D'Agostin left and was called up to enlist into the U.S. Army. Members from the Kelly Four returned, Deasy and Henderson, with Stivers and Riggio being accompanied by bassist Don Meyer (later replaced by Dave Shriver). This was the last line-up of Cochran's touring band, returning to the name of the Kelly Four.

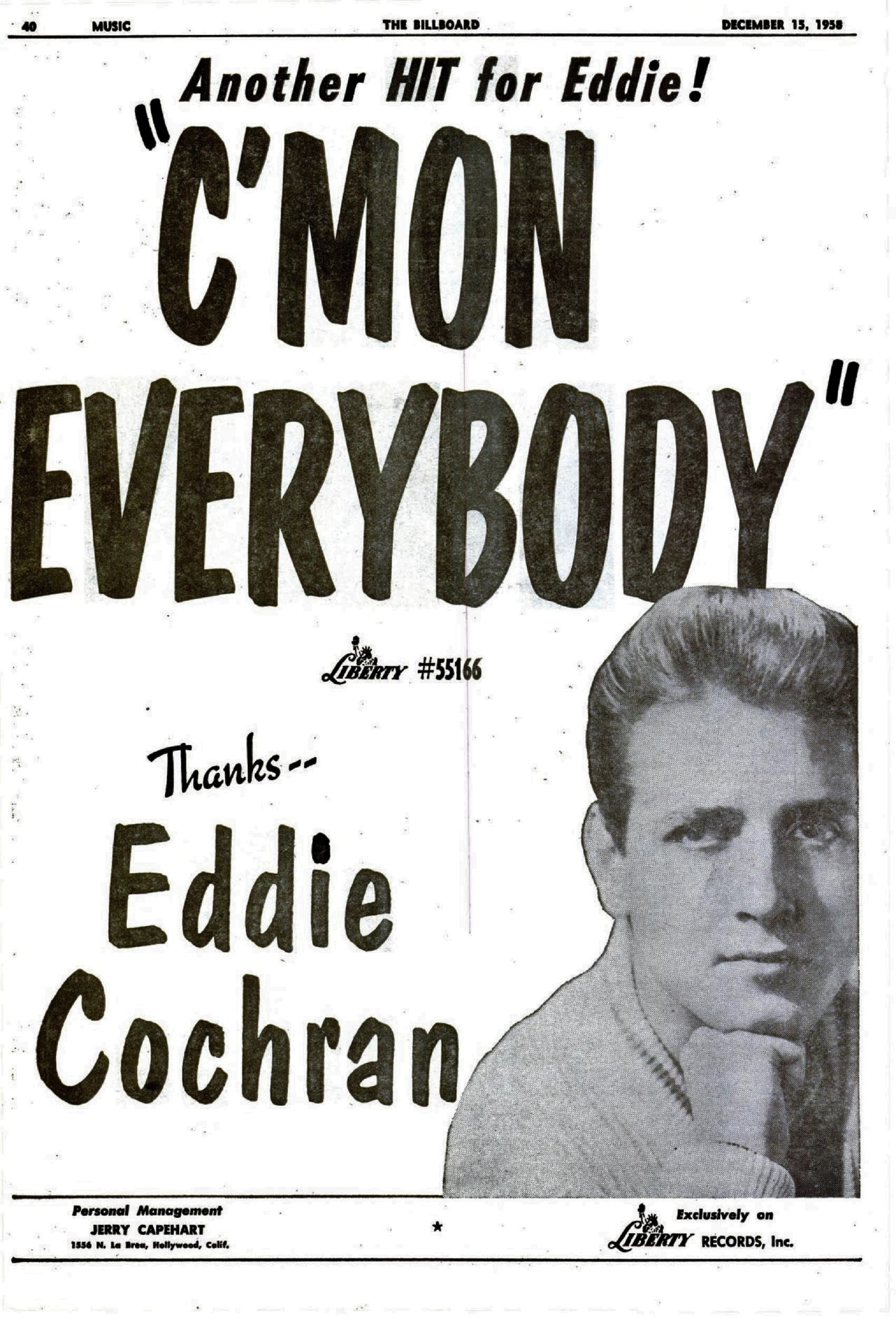
Billboard advertisement, December 15, 1958

Cochran starred in his last film Go, Johnny, Go! (1959). In January 1960, Cochran recorded his last session at Gold Star Studios. His brief music career included a few more hits, such as "C'mon, Everybody", "Somethin' Else", "Teenage Heaven", and "Three Steps to Heaven", which posthumously topped the charts in the Republic of Ireland and the United Kingdom in 1960. He remained popular in the United States and United Kingdom through the late 1950s and early 1960s, and more of his records were posthumous hits, such as "My Way", "Weekend", and "Nervous Breakdown".

=== Television appearances ===
Throughout his music career, Cochran made a few television appearances. On October 22, 1957, in Portland, Oregon, Cochran appeared on KPTV's High Time, hosted by Gene Brendler, and sang "Am I Blue?". During late 1957, Cochran was on the Biggest Show of Stars for '57 tour with Buddy Holly and the Crickets, Fats Domino, Chuck Berry, the Everly Brothers, Buddy Knox, Frankie Lymon, and Paul Anka, among others. In November 1958, Cochran performed on American Bandstand, and The Dick Clark Show (Dick Clark's Saturday Night Beech-Nut), in which he played his hit song "C'mon Everybody".

On February 7, 1959, Cochran performed live on Town Hall Party with Dick D'Agostin and the Swingers. He played "C'mon, Everybody", "Have I Told You Lately That I Love You", "Don't Blame It On Me", "Summertime Blues", "School Days", Gene Autry's "Be Honest With Me", and "Money Honey". There was a brief interview segment on the show, and Cochran was asked about his prediction for the future of rock 'n' roll music. On October 10, 1959, he appeared on The Dick Clark Show (Dick Clark's Saturday Night Beech-Nut), and performed "Somethin' Else" and "Sittin' in the Balcony".

During his UK Tour in 1960, Cochran performed on the BBC radio show Saturday Club and the British ABC TV programme Boy Meets Girls, hosted by Marty Wilde. In late January 1960, Cochran appeared on two episodes and performed live an array of songs including a newly released cover of Ray Charles' "Hallelujah I Love Her So".

I think actually rock 'n' roll will be here for quite sometime. But I don't think it's going be rock 'n' roll as we know it today...I think it has been around for a long time, but nobody actually recognized it. The way I look at it, rhythm and blues y'know, and blues has been around for so long, and then they kind of blended country and western music in with it y'know. I think it's going to be here for a long time, but changing.

— Eddie Cochran, Town Hall Party, February 7, 1959

=== Session musician and producer ===
Another aspect of Cochran's short career is his work as a session musician and producer. In 1959, Cochran played lead for Skeets McDonald at Columbia's studios for "You Oughta See Grandma Rock" and "Heart Breaking Mama". In a session for Gene Vincent in March 1958, he contributed his trademark bass voice, as heard on "Summertime Blues". The recordings were issued on the album A Gene Vincent Record Date.

Cochran worked mainly as a guitarist, and sometimes as a vocalist and arranger for other artists, such as Mamie Van Doren, Baker Knight, Johnny Burnette, Wynn Stewart, and Al Casey.

=== The Day the Music Died (1959) ===
In early 1959, two of Cochran's friends, Buddy Holly and Ritchie Valens, along with the Big Bopper, were killed in a plane crash while on tour on February 3, 1959. Cochran's friends and family later said that he was badly shaken by their deaths, and he developed a morbid premonition that he also would die young. Shortly after their deaths, Cochran recorded a song (written by disc jockey Tommy Dee) in tribute to them, "Three Stars". He was anxious to give up life on the road and spend his time in the studio making music, thereby reducing the chance of suffering a similar fatal accident while touring. Financial responsibilities, however, required that Cochran continue to perform live, and that led to his acceptance of an offer to tour the United Kingdom in 1960.

=== United Kingdom tour (1960) ===
Organized and promoted by Larry Parnes, Cochran and Gene Vincent toured the United Kingdom from January through to April 1960. On the bill, they were accompanied by British acts Billy Fury, Joe Brown, Vince Eager, and Tony Sheridan. At the beginning of the tour, Cochran first performed a memorable show in Ipswich, Suffolk at the cinema venue Ipswich Gaumont. Cochran was backed by Marty Wilde's band The Wildcats throughout the 1960 tour, exposing the British audience to live American rock 'n' roll. Georgie Fame, then a member of the Beat Boys and the backing band for Vincent, recollected, "I remember Eddie playing guitar and we were astounded." During the progression of the tour, Cochran's fiancé Sharon Sheeley had flown in from America and joined them in late March. From a distance, Sheeley had kept track of Cochran's performances in England, when he had sent her postcards and letters. Using a map, she tried to pinpoint exactly where he was each day on the tour. However, their tour ended abruptly.

Not quite as long as Gene [Vincent]. I'll be here until April 17th, and then I go home for seven days, and then I'm back near the end of April and stay here for ten more weeks.

— Eddie Cochran, Interview on Saturday Club (BBC Radio), March 12, 1960

== Death ==
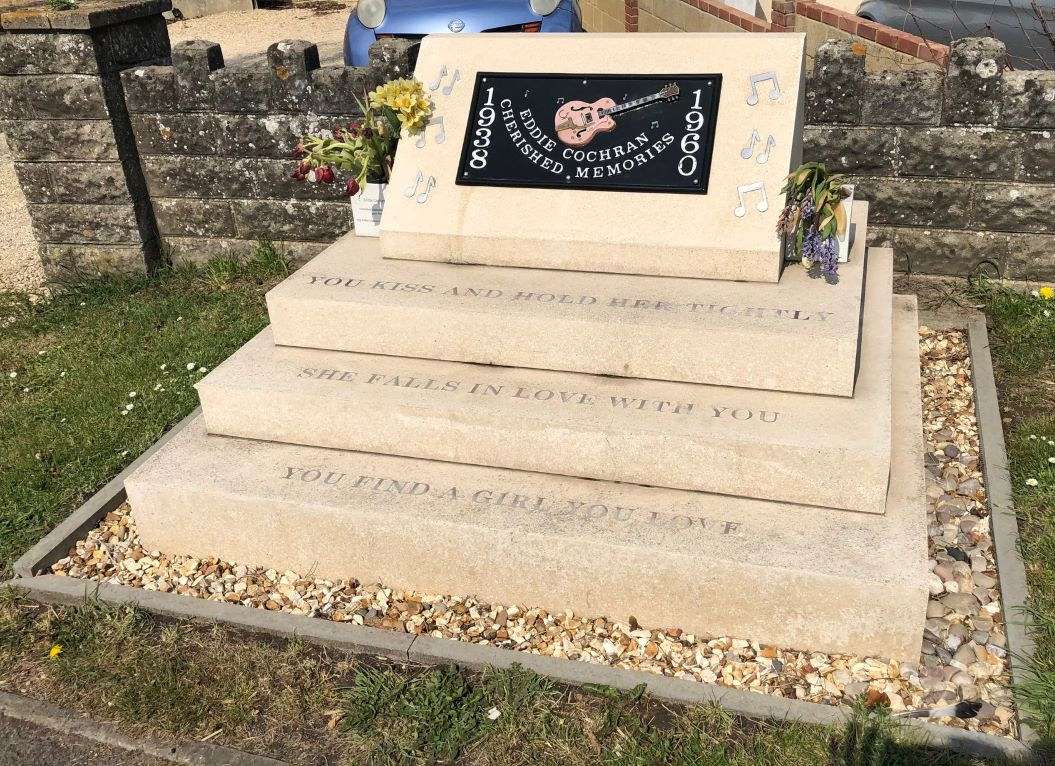
Eddie Cochran Memorial, Rowden Hill, Chippenham

On the evening of April 16, 1960, Cochran and his friend and fellow performing artist Gene Vincent had just finished performing at the last of their scheduled concerts at the Bristol Hippodrome. Having returned to the Royal Hotel at the bottom of Park Street and gathered their belongings, they waited for their taxi to arrive. They travelled along the Bath Road in a cream-coloured 1960 model Ford Consul Mark II saloon from Bristol towards London to Heathrow Airport. At about 11:50 p.m. that night, the driver, 19-year-old George Martin (no relation to the record producer of the same name) lost control of the vehicle, which crashed into a concrete lamppost at Rowden Hill in Chippenham. In addition to Cochran and Vincent, the other passengers in the vehicle were Sharon Sheeley, and Patrick Tompkins (the tour manager, 29 years old). At the moment of impact, Cochran (who was seated in the center of the back seat) threw himself over Sheeley to shield her. The force of the collision caused the left rear passenger door to open, and Cochran was ejected from the vehicle, sustaining a massive traumatic brain injury from blunt force trauma to the skull or a cerebral contusion. The road was dry, and the weather was good, but the vehicle was later determined to be travelling at an excessive speed. No other vehicle was involved in the incident.

The occupants of the vehicle were all taken to Chippenham Community Hospital and later transferred to St. Martin's Hospital in Bath. Cochran never regained consciousness, and he died at 4:10 p.m. the following day – Easter Sunday. Sheeley suffered injuries to her back and thigh, Vincent suffered a fractured collarbone and severe injuries to his legs, and Tompkins sustained facial injuries and a possible fracture of the base of the skull. Martin did not sustain significant injuries. At the time of his death, Cochran was 21 years old.

Vincent and Sheeley returned to the United States after the accident. Cochran's body was flown home, and after a funeral service was buried on April 25, at Forest Lawn Memorial Park in Cypress, California. In August 1960, Sheeley told Photoplay magazine that Cochran said to her on his last day, just before entering the taxi to the airport, "You know, Shari, I've got a queer feeling that Fate's not going to let us [be together]. Something awful is going to happen—I can feel it."

Martin was convicted of dangerous driving, fined £50 (and in default of payment six months' imprisonment), and disqualified from driving for 15 years. His driving disqualification was lifted on May 7, 1968, after the judge at Bristol Assizes determined that Martin "had suffered considerable financial hardship". The car and other items from the crash were impounded at the local police station until a coroner's inquest could be held. David Harman, a police cadet at the station, who would later become known as Dave Dee of the band Dave Dee, Dozy, Beaky, Mick & Tich, is said to have played on Cochran's Gretsch 6120 guitar while it was held at the station.

There is a plaque marking the site of the car crash on Rowden Hill. There is also a memorial stone on the grounds of St Martin's Hospital in Bath, commemorating Cochran's death. The stone was restored in 2010 on the 50th anniversary of his death and can be found in the old chapel grounds at the hospital. A memorial plaque was also placed next to the sundial at the back of the old chapel. The Eddie Cochran Memorial Project spearheaded a fundraising campaign in 2018 to restore the plaque and install a brand new "Three Steps to Heaven" base at the Chippenham crash site.

While they were preparing to board their taxi, Vincent and Cochran rebuffed musician Tony Sheridan's request to ride along with them, resulting in Sheridan avoiding involvement in the accident.

== Personal life ==
Cochran dated singer-songwriter Sharon Sheeley. As a songwriter, Sheeley worked in the music business and for manager Jerry Capehart. She wrote "Love Again" and "Cherished Memories" for Cochran, and the 1959 hit song "Somethin' Else" with Eddie's brother Bill Cochran. Sheeley had been romantically interested in Cochran for two years, seemingly unrequited. Originally brunette, she dyed her hair blonde and spent money on a new wardrobe, in an attempt to impress Cochran. In 1958, after attending a New Year's Eve party hosted by Cochran in New York, the couple started dating. They were secretly engaged by 1960, and were planning a future together.

In 1988, Levi Strauss & Co. promoted their Levi's 501 range with a television commercial called Eddie Cochran, directed by Syd Macartney. It told the story of how Sheeley (played by actress Sharon Devlin) attracted Cochran at the 1958 party by wearing said product. It was supposedly narrated by Sheeley. The background song, "C'mon Everybody", was released as a promotional single, followed by a compilation album of Cochran's hits.

== Legacy ==
=== Posthumous releases and honors ===
A posthumous album, My Way, was released in 1964. Cochran was a prolific performer, and the British label Rockstar Records has released more of his music posthumously than was released during his life. The company is still looking for unpublished songs. One of his posthumous releases was "Three Stars", a tribute to J.P. Richardson, better known as the Big Bopper, and Cochran's friends Buddy Holly and Ritchie Valens, who had all died in a plane crash just one year earlier. Written just hours after the tragedy by disc jockey Tommy Dee, it was recorded by Cochran two days later (Dee recorded his own version several weeks later). His voice broke during the spoken lyrics about Valens and Holly.

In 1987, Cochran was inducted into the Rock and Roll Hall of Fame. His pioneering contribution to the genre of rockabilly has also been recognized by his induction to the Rockabilly Hall of Fame in 2017, at the same time as his nephew Bobby Cochran. Several of his songs have been re-released since his death, such as "C'mon Everybody", which was a number 14 hit in 1988 in the UK. Rolling Stone magazine ranked him number 84 on its 2003 list of the 100 greatest guitarists of all time.

The Very Best of Eddie Cochran was released by EMI Records on June 2, 2008.

On September 27, 2010, the mayor of Bell Gardens, California, declared October 3, 2010, to be "Eddie Cochran Day" to celebrate the famous musician who began his career when living in that city.

On June 10, 2022, Cochran's hometown of Albert Lea, Minnesota, renamed James Street to Eddie Cochran Street in his honor.

On May 23, 2023, Cochran was honored with a blue plaque in Bristol, South West England, at the Bristol Hippodrome venue, the last place Cochran performed on his ill-fated tour in 1960.

==== Music ====
In 1963, pop star Heinz Burt and producer Joe Meek paid tribute to Cochran with the song "Just Like Eddie" which became a top five chart hit.

==== Film ====
In 1986, there was a planned biopic, Summertime Blues: The Eddie Cochran Story, produced by Cassian Elwes and starring Rob Lowe as Cochran. D'Agostin was involved in the pre-production stage, but the film was never made. Played by actor Jerry Zaremba, Cochran appeared in The Buddy Holly Story (1978), directed by Steve Rash. Cochran was played by Brian Setzer of Stray Cats in the Ritchie Valens biopic La Bamba (1987).

There have been two documentary films made on Eddie Cochran's life by the BBC, Three Steps to Heaven (aired on November 30, 1982 BBC Arena), and Cherished Memories (2001 BBC). In 2022, It was announced that Kirsty Bell's documentary was in the works, titled Don't Forget Me. Another documentary film titled The Bell Gardens Rocker was also in production.

The 2026 British documentary film Eddie Cochran: Don't Forget Me produced by Goldfinch Entertainment in partnership with the Cochran estate and Universal Music Enterprises had its world premiere on April 10, 2026, at the 50th Cleveland International Film Festival, United States. It premiered in the U.K. at the Raindance Film Festival on June 26 at Vue Piccadilly, London. It is scheduled to be released in cinemas across the United Kingdom on September 11, 2026, by Fremantle distribution.

==== Books ====
Cochran's life is chronicled in several publications, including Don't Forget Me: The Eddie Cochran Story, by Julie Mundy and Darrel Higham (ISBN 0-8230-7931-7), and Three Steps to Heaven, by his nephew Bobby Cochran (ISBN 0-634-03252-6).

== Style and influence ==
Cochran was one of the first rock-and-roll artists to write his own songs and overdub tracks. He is also credited with being one of the first to use an unwound third string to "bend" notes up a tone—an innovation (imparted to the British guitarist Joe Brown, who secured much session work as a result) that has become an essential part of the standard rock guitar vocabulary.

Cochran was well known for playing the Gretsch 6120 guitar, with a Wild West "G" branded into the body's bass bout. In 2010, Gretch and Fender Musical Instruments Corporation announced the G6120 Eddie Cochran Signature Hollow Body model, based on Cochran's original modified Gretsch.

=== Influence ===
Many artists have covered Cochran's songs, such as Joan Jett and the Blackhearts, the Who, the Rolling Stones, Bruce Springsteen, UFO, Van Halen, Tom Petty, Rod Stewart, T. Rex, Cliff Richard, the Beach Boys, Led Zeppelin, the White Stripes, the Sex Pistols, Sid Vicious, Rush, Simple Minds, George Thorogood, Guitar Wolf, Alan Jackson, the Move, David Bowie, Johnny Hallyday, and U2.

It was because Paul McCartney knew the chords and words to "Twenty Flight Rock" that he became a member of the Beatles. On July 6, 1957, McCartney met John Lennon at the St Peter's Church and performed a few songs for him, including Cochran's "Twenty Flight Rock". Lennon was so impressed that he invited McCartney to play in his band, the Quarrymen.

From a young age, Jimi Hendrix was influenced by Cochran. Hendrix performed "Summertime Blues" early in his career, with his band the Jimi Hendrix Experience in 1967. Hendrix requested a few of Cochran's songs to be played at his funeral. "I tell you, when I die I'm going to have a jam session. I want people to go wild and freak out. And knowing me, I'll probably get busted at my own funeral. The music will be played loud and it will be our music. I won't have any Beatles songs, but I'll have a few of Eddie Cochran's things and a whole lot of blues."

The Who's Pete Townshend was influenced by Cochran's guitar style ("Summertime Blues" was a staple of live performances by the Who for most of their career, until the death of bassist and vocalist John Entwistle in 2002, and is featured on their album Live at Leeds). Blue Cheer's version of "Summertime Blues" was their only hit and signature song, and has been described as the first heavy metal song.

Producer Terry Manning recorded a live version of "Somethin' Else" in concert, held inside Elvis Presley's first house in Memphis. In 2019, he released a live album Playin' with Elvis, on ECR. In 2016, Manning told PopWrapped, "I love rock and roll ... the early stuff like Eddie Cochran and Buddy Holly, not to mention Elvis, was very important to me."

The English band Humble Pie did a rendition of "C'mon, Everybody" and the song featured on their album Smokin' (1972).

The glam rock artist Marc Bolan had his main Gibson Les Paul guitar refinished in a transparent orange to resemble the Gretsch 6120 played by Cochran, who was his music hero. He was also an influence on Brian Setzer,of Stray Cats, and portrayed him in the film La Bamba.

Eddie was a huge idol to his nephew Bobby Cochran, who would later play guitar for Steppenwolf, The Flying Burrito Brothers, and Bobby and the Midnites, among others. Bobby has stated that as a child he would have lucid dreams of Eddie teaching him how to play the guitar, and that his playing benefited from hearing Eddie's unreleased music. Bobby would later become the only living inductee to the Rockabilly Hall of Fame, being inducted at the same time as Eddie.

== Filmography ==
Eddie Cochran filmography
Year	Film	Role	Distributor
1956	The Girl Can't Help It	Himself	20th Century Fox
1957	Untamed Youth	Bong	Warner Bros.
1959	Go, Johnny, Go	Himself	Hal Roach Studios

== Discography ==
Year	Title	Details	Peak chart positions
Year	Title	Details	UK
1957	Singin' to My Baby	Released: November 1957; Label: Liberty	19
