= Gas House Gang (quartet) =

Barbershop quartet

The Gas House Gang
- Also known as: GHG
- Origin: Saint Louis, Missouri
- Genres: Barbershop
- Occupation: Barbershop quartet
- Years active: 1987–2005
- Past members: Kipp Buckner – tenor Rich Knight – lead Rob Henry – baritone Dr. Jim Henry – bass Joe Fink (1988–1990) – tenor
- Website: www.facebook.com/gashousegangquartet

Gas House Gang was a barbershop quartet that won the 1993 SPEBSQSA International Quartet Competition. They began singing together as a group in 1987 in St. Louis, Missouri. After winning the Central States District Competition in 1988 on their first attempt, they steadily advanced in the International Competition, ultimately winning the 1993 International Quartet Championship in Calgary, Alberta, Canada.

== Performances ==
The Gas House Gang toured the United States and they performed in all fifty states in the U.S. They also sang extensively in Canada and performed around the world, singing in 15 countries.

Major highlights included:

- Singing on a PBS special with Marquis (quartet), "Voices in Harmony"
- NPR's "At the Creation"
- NBC's Today Show
- BBC Radio
- Singing at Carnegie Hall three times
- Singing on the stage at the Grand Ole Opry
- Professional productions of The Music Man with the St. Louis Symphony Orchestra at The Muny
- Cruise ship performances
- Performers with whom they shared the stage include The Four Freshmen, The Swingle Singers, Rockapella, The Persuasions, The Chordettes, The King's Singers, the St. Louis Symphony Orchestra, Victor Borge, Porter Wagoner, GLAD and the Grammy award-winning group Chanticleer.
- They produced five recordings
- They were awarded nominations and awards by the Contemporary A Cappella Society of America (CASA), including Best Barbershop Song, Studio Album of the Year, Artist of the Year, Best Christmas Album, and Best Christmas Song.
- They were named to the Barbershop Harmony Society's Hall of Fame in 2008.

On June 3, 2004, the quartet announced their retirement at the end of 2005.

As a part of their 25th-anniversary performance on the 2018 Association of International Champions Show, the Gas House Gang shared a tribute to their original baritone Rob Henry, with some help from his son, Ryan.

== Contest placement ==
=== International ===
1989	1990	1991	1992	1993
13th	6th	3rd	2nd	1st

=== Central States District (CSD) ===
- 1988 – 1st

== Members ==
- Original tenor: Joe Fink (1988–1990)
- Winning members:
  - Tenor: Kipp Buckner
  - Lead: Rich Knight
  - Bari: Rob Henry
  - Bass: Jim Henry
- Kipp Buckner began singing barbershop when he was 14 with the Louisville Thoroughbreds chorus and international championship victories in 1981 and 1984. He is one of two men to have won the International Champion Quartet Medal three times. (Jeff Oxley also won three, with Acoustix, The Rapscallions, and Max Q.) Buckner won his three gold medals with the GHG in 1993, the Interstate Rivals in 1987, and Old School in 2011. Buckner sang with the Ambassadors of Harmony for their first international championship victory in 2004 in his hometown of Louisville, Kentucky.
- Jim Henry, PhD joined the society at the age of 11 as a member of the Daniel Boone Chorus, which became the Ambassadors of Harmony. He became the director of the Ambassadors in 1991 and went on to lead the chorus to 16 medals including 4 gold medals (2004, 2009, 2012 and 2016). In 2009 when Crossroads won, Jim became the only man in BHS history to direct the winning chorus and win with his quartet in the same year. In 2019, he was inducted to the Barbershop Harmony Society's Hall of Fame.
  Henry's 2000 doctoral dissertation on the African American origins of barbershop harmony and his 2007 Harmony University keynote address, "Gold Medal Moments" have influenced the study, philosophy, and discourse of barbershop harmony.
- Rich Knight has sung with the Ambassadors of Harmony since the 1970s and has been part of each championship. His lead voice creates the defining sound of the GHG. He is an active member in the Central States District. He is an active coach and clinician, teaching at district events, Harmony University and International Barbershop events.
- Rob Henry, the quartet's baritone, was diagnosed with esophageal cancer on May 30, 2003, and died shortly thereafter on September 4, 2003.

Several prominent barbershop singers helped fill in after Rob's death, to fulfill show obligations.

Replacement baritone members:

- Mike Slamka (Power Play and Crossroads)
- Brandon Guyton (Four Voices and Crossroads)
- DJ Hiner (The Ritz)
- Tony DeRosa (Keepsake, Platinum, Max Q, and Main Street)
- Jonny Moroni (Vocal Spectrum)

== Discography/recordings ==
Our Rough & Tumble Best (1989)	A Little Night Music (1992)	Face The Music (1996)	Some Children See Him... (2000)	The Gas House Gang's Fifth (2003)
Bowery Medley	Wonderful Day Medley	Strike Up The Band Medley	Caroling, Caroling	Beethoven 5.1
Sixteen Tons	The Moment I Saw Your Eyes	Wedding Bells	The Little Drummer Boy	Lazy Day
So Long, Mother	I Still Can't Say Goodbye	Brother Can You Spare A Dime	Merry Christmas, Darling	Blackbird/I Will
K.P.	O.C. Cash / The Flat Foot Four	Muskrat Ramble	Mary, Did You Know?	Goodbye, World, Goodbye
When I Look In Your Eyes	Shine	Where The Southern Roses Grow	Pat-A-Pan	My Coloring Book
Pass The Apples Medley	The Music Of The Night	Above My Head, I Hear Music	O Come Emmanuel	We're Little But We're Loud
Liar Medley	Sit Down, You're Rockin' The Boat	Erie Canal	Have Yourself A Merry Little Christmas	Great Day
Old St. Louis	No More Sorrow	All Aboard For Dixieland	Carol Of The Bells	Will You Love Me Tomorrow?
My Old Man	Bright Was The Night	Don't Be A Baby, Baby	Do You Hear What I Hear?	Ezekiel Saw The Wheel
The Chemical Elements	Eine Kleine NOT Musik	This Is Some Lucky Day	Go Tell It On The Mountain	Lullabye (Goodnight My Angel) for Ryan
Sweet Hour Of Prayer	Love-Eyes Medley	Old Hymns Medley	Some Children See Him	Ob-La-Di, Ob-La-Da
William Tell Overture	Sometimes	Alleluia	bonus track: 'Twas the Night Before Christmas	Hold On
		bonus track: Geda's Song	White Christmas	

Preceded by Keepsake	SPEBSQSA International Quartet Champions; 1993	Succeeded by Joker's Wild
