= Max Q (quartet) =

Barbershop quartet

- Max Q

Background information
- Genre: Barbershop
- Years active: 2002–present
- Members: Greg Clancy – tenor Tony DeRosa – lead Gary Lewis – baritone Jeff Oxley – bass

Max Q is the barbershop quartet that won the gold medal Barbershop Harmony Society International Barbershop Quartet Contest at Denver's Pepsi Center July 7, 2007. The quartet's run for the title is featured in the 2009 feature documentary American Harmony.

== Background ==
Max Q formed in 2002 and began competing in the International Barbershop Quartet Contest in 2004. In 2004, 2005, and 2006, Max Q finished in second place to Gotcha!, Realtime, and Vocal Spectrum in consecutive years. In 2007, Max Q won by a 286-point margin over second-place quartet OC Times.

Max Q is notable in that all four members have prior experience in championship-level quartets and choruses. With their 2007 win, DeRosa and Oxley joined Joe Connelly as the only singers with three first-place finishes. Lewis has gone onto win a third gold medal with the quartet Quorum in 2022 as the only man to win gold in 3 separate vocal parts, and DeRosa and Connelly have since gone on to win a record fourth gold medal with Main Street and Old School, respectively. DeRosa won a fifth gold medal with Three and a Half Men in 2024.

== Members ==
- Greg Clancy – tenor; currently musical director of the Vocal Majority chorus, and has participated in all 13 Vocal Majority gold medal victories—eleven as a singer, and the most recent two as musical director.
- Tony DeRosa – lead, former five-time gold medalist singing baritone with 1992 champions Keepsake, 2000 champions Platinum, 2017 champions Main Street, and Three and a Half men in 2024. He currently directs the Big Orange Chorus out of Jacksonville, Florida, as well as the Heralds of Harmony and Toast of Tampa Show Chorus women's chorus out of Tampa, Florida.
- Gary Lewis – baritone in Max Q, three-time former gold medalist singing tenor with Platinum, bass with Quorum and the Collegiate Quartet "The Real Deal". First, and only singer to win gold in 3 vocal parts (bass, baritone, and tenor) in the International Barbershop Harmony Society. He was director of the Sweet Adelines Chorus "Pride of Toledo" and sang as replacement bass for 1992 champs Keepsake. He now directs the Men of Independence chorus in Independence, Ohio.
- Jeff Oxley – bass, former three-time gold medalist with The Rapscallions in 1984 and Acoustix in 1990, former associate director and bass section leader of the Vocal Majority, participated in 6 Vocal Majority gold medal victories, and one gold medal as musical director of the Masters of Harmony chorus

In 2008, Oxley and DeRosa were elected to the Westminster Chorus Fantasy Gold Quartet as bass and baritone along with lead Joe Connelly (Old School 2011, Platinum 2000, Keepsake 1992, Interstate Rivals 1987) and tenor Tim Waurick (Vocal Spectrum 2006).

== See also ==
- Barbershop music
- Ambassadors of Harmony
- Barbershop Harmony Society
- List of quartet champions by year

Preceded by Vocal Spectrum	SPEBSQSA International Quartet Champions; 2007	Succeeded by OC Times
