= Toast of Tampa Show Chorus =

American all-female a cappella chorus

Toast of Tampa Show Chorus is an women's a cappella chorus, composed of 100 women singers of all ages. The non-profit group, a chapter of Sweet Adelines International, competes and performs around the world, and is considered locally to be among the best barbershop music choruses in the world.

The Toast of Tampa Show Chorus won the gold medal at the 2025 SAI International Competition in Columbus, Ohio.

== History ==
Toast of Tampa was founded in 1987 as a vehicle for women to sing in four-part harmony and express their love of music.

== Chorus overview ==
The chorus is composed of women from a variety of personal and professional backgrounds, from working women, stay-at-home mothers, students, and retirees. Some are professional musicians, though most are passionate amateurs. Musical training is not a pre-requisite, auditions are required to join.

The chorus sings and dances together, and some members also perform in quartets, including Viva! (Sweet Adelines International 2019 2nd place medalist). On Valentine's Day, many quartets deliver singing telegrams.

Tony De Rosa is the chorus's Master 700 Director. He is a five-time Barbershop Harmony Society International Gold Medalist who sang with 1992 champion Keepsake, 2000 champion Platinum, 2007 champion Max Q, 2017 champion Main Street, and 2024 champion Three and a Half Men. He also directs the Barbershop Harmony Society's Tampa Bay Heralds of Harmony. In 2013 was named a level Master 700 Director in the Director Certification Program (DCP) of Sweet Adelines.

Rehearsals are held in Tampa, and chorus members come from all over the state of Florida.

In October, 2014, several chorus members joined fellow singers from the Big Orange Chorus, and Tampa Bay Heralds of Harmony, on a trip to Great Britain where they performed at Bath Abbey, King's College Cambridge University, and numerous other churches.
