= Heralds of Harmony =

Florida-based men's acappella chorus

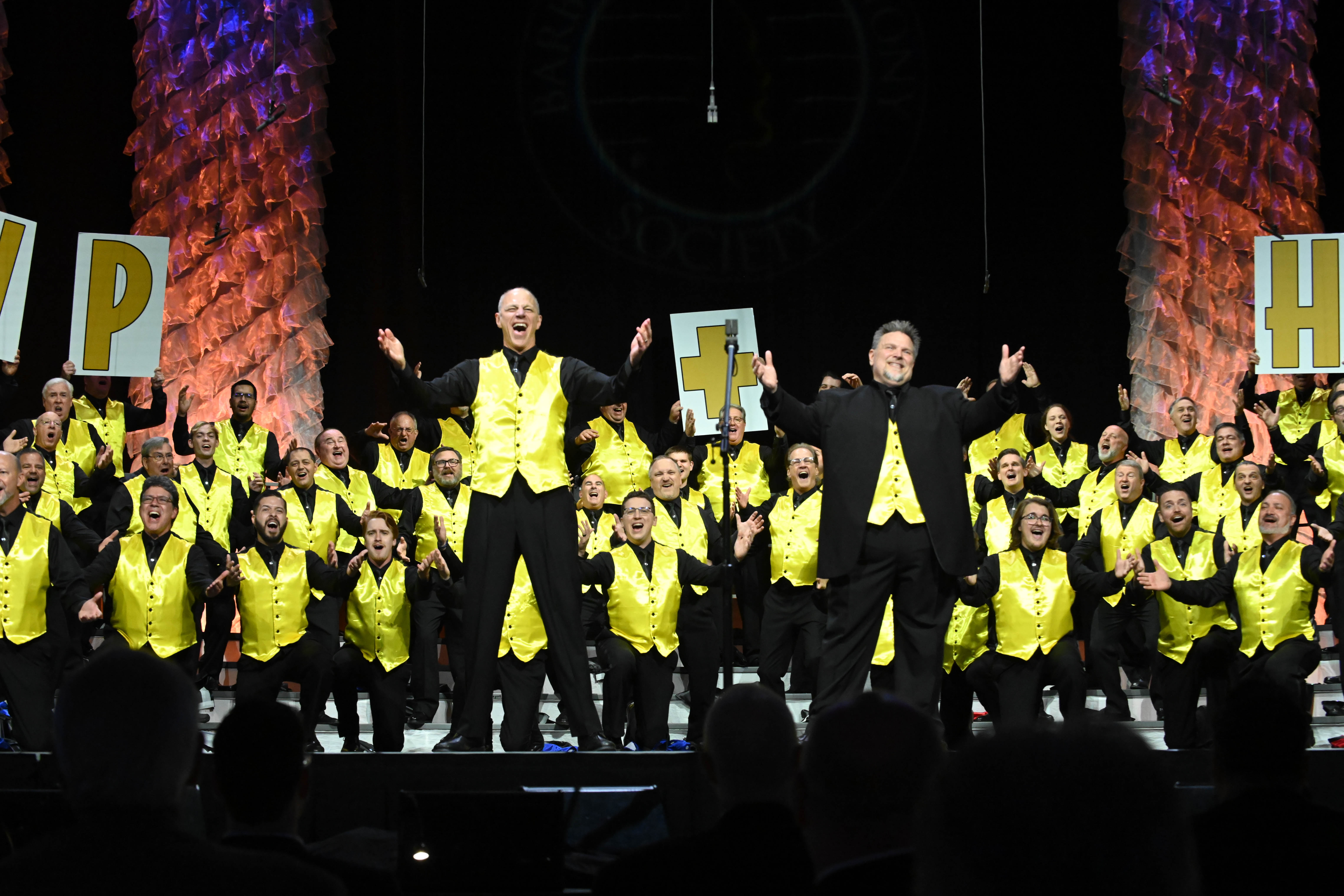
- At the 2023 Barbershop Harmony Society international contest where they placed 3rd

Background information
- Origin: Tampa, Florida
- Genres: Barbershop music
- Years active: 1945–present
- Website: Official site

The Heralds of Harmony is a Tampa, Florida-based men's a cappella chorus that has been entertaining Florida audiences in the barbershop style continuously since 1945, and is currently ranked among the nation's best male vocal ensembles. The Heralds are affiliated with the Barbershop Harmony Society (BHS) and are multiple-time Sunshine District barbershop chorus champions. They consistently represent the district at the BHS international chorus contest, where they ranked 2nd in the world in July 2024, at a percent higher than their 2023 3rd-place score.

== Performances and quartets ==
Multiple quartets who have qualified for international competition have emerged from the Heralds of Harmony, including BHS gold medal champions Keepsake (1992) and Platinum (2000). Since the early 2000s, the chorus has been led by three directors who are gold medal winners in chorus or quartet competition: Tony De Rosa, Randy Loos, and Roger Ross.

The Heralds are regularly featured as guest performers in concert series and other events throughout the Tampa Bay area and other parts of Florida. They have performed multiple times with the Florida Orchestra, directed by guest conductors Skitch Henderson and Doc Severinsen. The Heralds also produce their own shows, most notably their annual Christmas shows.

== Community involvement ==
The Heralds have regularly supported the community by providing benefit performances for the Spring of Tampa Bay (women's shelter) in Hillsborough County and The Hospice of the Florida Suncoast in Pinellas County. The Heralds engage in an active youth outreach program offering in-service training to many vocal music educators of Pinellas and Hillsborough Counties, providing youth music scholarships, and often participate as a clinic chorus at the annual Florida Music Education Association conference.

The Arts Council of Hillsborough County announced the Heralds of Harmony as a recipient of one of its 2011–12 Cultural Development Grants. They are listed as a valuable nonprofit arts and cultural resource to the State of Florida. The chorus is one of the largest groups in its area and draws its members from several communities.

== International competition ==
The Heralds of Harmony were ranked 6th in the world at the Barbershop Harmony Society's international competition in July 2018, at the Orange County Convention Center in Orlando, Florida.

The Heralds of Harmony were ranked 3rd in the world at the Barbershop Harmony Society's international competition in July 2023, at the KFC Yum Center in Louisville, Kentucky. The Heralds collaborated with the Atlanta Vocal Project chorus and had about 80 members on stage for the competition.

== Director ==
Tony De Rosa is the director of the Heralds since 2012. He is a four-time gold medal-winning quartet champion, most recently with Main Street. De Rosa had previously directed the Heralds from 1994 to 2002, succeeding his father, and has directed the Toast of Tampa Show Chorus since 2007.

== History ==
The Heralds of Harmony were known as the Orange Belt Chorus when the chorus began in 1945.

== Discography ==
- This Joint is Jumpin' (CD; 1998)
- Songs of Christmas (CD; 2016)
