= Bill Burkette =

- Born: September 17, 1942; Turtle Creek, Pennsylvania, US
- Died: March 1, 2018 (aged 75) Murrysville, Pennsylvania, US
- Genre: pop
- Years active: 1958–2018
- Formerly of: The Vogues

William W. Burkette III (September 17, 1942 – March 1, 2018) was an American singer, best known for being the primary lead singer for The Vogues.

== Career ==
Burkette started singing with a vocal group in high school, with help from his school principal. His main inspiration was "Oh, What a Night" by The Dells. He sang in a vocal group with Chuck Blasko, with whom he eventually joined Hugh Geyer and Don Miller and formed The Val-Aires. After recording demos with Elmer Willet as their manager, their name was changed to The Vogues, after a club Willet once owned.

In 1965, the group recorded their first two singles, "You're the One" (originally recorded by Petula Clark) and "Five O'Clock World", both of which charted at number four on the Billboard charts. Burkette was working in a factory at the time of The Vogues' first recordings, but quit his job with the rest of the group when "Five O'Clock World" became a hit. A "cold spell" of hits led to the Vogues reinventing themselves as a more Adult contemporary groip, which led to two more hit songs in 1968, "Turn Around, Look at Me" and "My Special Angel", both of which peaked at number seven on the Hot 100 chart, and the latter topping the Adult Contemporary chart. The Vogues had twelve more US top 40s in the Adult Contemporary chart by 1973. The original group disbanded in 1983, and Burkette took some time off singing to raise a family.

None of the original members of the Vogues owned the trademark to the name, meaning after the group disbanded, the rights to the name were sold and a new group of fresh faces toured as the Vogues. Blasko sang in his own versions of The Vogues, and, when his children got old enough, so did Bill, but a court order against the owner of the trademarker meant they could only sing in 14 Pittsburgh counties as "The Vogues", whereas the trademarkers could sing anywhere else with the name; which inspired Bill to dissolve his group.

In 2001, the Vogues were inducted into the Vocal Group Hall of Fame.

In 2007, original member Hugh Geyer was called by one of the trademark owners and a member of the new Vogues group to join the group. Geyer joined and a year later the group had ideas of bringing Burkette into the group. In May 2008, Burkette joined the version of the Vogues that was owned by Stan Elich, and that could tour throughout the US. According to Burkette, he was "bitter" for many years about the name scandal, but felt that the invitation to join the larger touring group was "like a validation".

== Personal life ==
Burkette was married to Elaine M. Downing Burkette for fifty-four years. They had three children and three grandchildren. While he was not active in the Vogues, he was a local sales manager position at a home improvements company. He spent the rest of his life living in Murrysville, Pennsylvania.

== Death ==
After struggling with breathing problems at a Vogues gig in Prescott, Arizona, Burkette was soon diagnosed with lung cancer. Burkette died at 7 a.m. at William Penn Care Center in Penn Township on March 1, 2018, aged 75. He had stepped down from touring, but at the time of his death had planned on returning to the road. According to his wife, he also had lymphoma.
