= Interstate Rivals =

Barbershop quartet

- Years active: 1982–91
- Members: Kipp Buckner – tenor Joe Connelly – lead Paul Gilman – baritone Jay Hawkins – bass
- Website: Official site

The Interstate Rivals is the barbershop quartet that won the 1987 SPEBSQSA international competition in Hartford, Connecticut. Formed in 1982, the Rivals won the Cardinal District championship that fall. The next summer at the international contest they placed tenth, followed by sixth, third, second-place finishes before winning in 1987. They sang and travelled widely, until they disbanded in August 1991. All four members went on to repeat gold medals with Keepsake, Gas House Gang, Marquis, Platinum and Old School. The members combine for a total of 11 gold medals between the four, all winning on just one voice part each.

== Discography ==
- It's A Brand New Day (LP 1987, cassette, CD; 1989)
- The Bronze Edition (LP, cassette; 1986)

They also appear on the CD The Thoroughbreds Present Solid Gold.

Preceded by Rural Route 4	Barbershop Harmony Society International Quartet Champions; 1987	Succeeded by Chiefs of Staff
