= The Vogues' Greatest Hits =

The Vogues Greatest Hits

Greatest hits album by The Vogues
- Released: January 1970
- Genre: Pop
- Label: Reprise
- Producer: Dick Glasser

The Vogues chronology
Memories (1969)	The Vogues Greatest Hits (1970)	The Vogues Sing the Good Old Songs (1970)

The Vogues' Greatest Hits is an LP album by The Vogues, released by Reprise Records (RS 6371) in 1970, consisting of the group's charted hits from the Co & Ce and Reprise labels. For this collection, arranger Ernie Freeman wrote orchestral parts to overdub the original Co & Ce masters of "You're the One", "Five O'Clock World", and "Magic Town" since all the Reprise songs were orchestrated.

Three of the twelve tracks make their album debut in this compilation: "Magic Town", "Green Fields", and "See That Girl".

An album review in Billboard called it a "collector's delight" and "a musical trip down memory lane".

== Track listing ==
Track number	Title	Songwriter(s)
1	"Turn Around, Look at Me"	Jerry Capehart
2	"Earth Angel (Will You Be Mine)"	Curtis Williams/Jesse Belvin/Gaynel Hodge
3	"You're the One"	Petula Clark/Tony Hatch
4	"Green Fields"	Terry Gilkyson/Richard Dehr/Frank Miller
5	"No, Not Much"	Robert Allen/Al Stillman
6	"See That Girl?"	Barry Mann/Cynthia Weil
7	"My Special Angel"	Jimmy Duncan
8	"Moments To Remember"	Robert Allen/Al Stillman
9	"Magic Town"	Barry Mann/Cynthia Weil
10	"Woman Helping Man"	Mark Charron
11	"Five O'Clock World"	Allen Reynolds
12	"Till"	Charles Danvers/Carl Sigman
