= Once Upon a Time (The Lettermen album) =

Studio album by The Lettermen
- Released: June 1962
- Genre: Traditional pop
- Label: Capitol
- Producer: Nick Venet

The Lettermen chronology
A Song for Young Love (1962)	Once Upon a Time (1962)	Jim, Tony, and Bob (1962)

Professional ratings
Review scores
Source	Rating
AllMusic	4.5/5 stars

Once Upon a Time is an album recorded by The Lettermen released in 1962. This album, combined with their debut A Song for Young Love, was remastered and reissued on CD. Jimmie Haskell was credited for the string arrangements and as the conductor. George Jerman was responsible for the album cover.

== Track listing ==
1. "Time Was (Duerme)" (Gabriel Luna, Miguel Prado, Bob Russell)
2. "Young and Foolish" (Albert Hague, Arnold B. Horwitt)
3. "Lover's Beach" (Chuck Blore, Carl Prior, Euro Testi)
4. "Polka Dots and Moonbeams" (Johnny Burke, Jimmy Van Heusen)
5. "Evening Rain" (Leon Pober)
6. "Once Upon a Time" (Lee Adams, Charles Strouse)
7. "How Is Julie?" (Eddy Carroll, Barry DeVorzon)
8. "My Funny Valentine" (Richard Rodgers, Lorenz Hart)
9. "Remembering Last Summer" (Barry Mann, Cynthia Weil)
10. "Sixteen Reasons (Why I Love You)" (Bill Post)
11. "Summer's Gone" (Paul Anka)
12. "Turn Around, Look at Me" (Jerry Capehart)
