= Storm Front =

Storm Front may refer to:

- Weather fronts

== Film and TV ==
- Storm Front (Star Trek: Enterprise), a 2004 episode of Star Trek: Enterprise

== Books ==
- Storm Front (novel), a 2000 fantasy novel by Jim Butcher
- Storm Front, a novel by John Sandford
- Storm Front, novel ghostwritten for fictional TV character Richard Castle

== Music ==
- Storm Front (quartet), the 2010 international champion barbershop quartet
- Storm Front (album), the eleventh studio album by Billy Joel

== See also ==
- Stormfront (disambiguation)
