= I Have Dreamed =

I Have Dreamed may refer to:

- "I Have Dreamed" (song), a song by Rodgers and Hammerstein from the musical The King and I
- I Have Dreamed (Doris Day album), an album by Doris Day
- I Have Dreamed (The Lettermen album), an album by The Lettermen

== See also ==
- I Have a Dream (disambiguation)
