= Come Back Silly Girl =

Single by The Lettermen

from the album A Song for Young Love
- B-side: "A Song for Young Love"
- Released: 1962
- Genre: Easy listening
- Length: 2:24
- Label: Capitol
- Songwriter: Barry Mann

The Lettermen singles chronology
"When I Fall in Love" (1961)	"Come Back Silly Girl" (1962)	"How Is Julie?" / "Turn Around, Look at Me" (1962)

"Come Back Silly Girl" is a song written by Barry Mann. It was first released as a single by Steve Lawrence in 1960. This version garnered very little notice but was a minor hit in Australia.

== The Lettermen version ==
In 1962, the Lettermen released their version as a single from their album A Song for Young Love. This version became a top twenty hit on Billboard's pop and easy listening charts. The song also reached No. 18 in the Canadian city of Vancouver and No. 19 on Cashbox in the US.

Chart (1962)	Peak position
Canada CHUM Chart	12
U.S. Billboard Hot 100	17
U.S. Billboard Easy Listening	3

== The Staccatos version ==
In the last two weeks of December 1965 a version by the South African group, The Staccatos, reached number 2 on the South African Singles Chart.
