= American Harmony =

- The greatest singing competition you've never heard of...
- Directed by: Aengus James
- Written by: Aengus James
- Produced by: Aengus James; Colin Miller
- Starring: Max Q, OC Times, Vocal Spectrum, Reveille, Joe Connelly
- Edited by: Kate Amend
- Distributed by: Abramorama (Theatrical), Breaking Glass Pictures (DVD/VOD)
- Release date: February 14, 2009 (BIFF)
- Running time: 86 minutes
- Country: United States
- Language: English

American Harmony is a 2009 documentary film directed and produced by Aengus James, produced by Colin Miller, and edited by Kate Amend.

American Harmony, the documentary, was initially screened at the Barbershop Harmony Society’s 2008 International Convention in Nashville. The film is a tribute to the human musical spirit as practiced in the barbershop genre. It was in production for more than three years and was edited by Kate Amend, the editor of two Oscar-winning documentaries.

American Harmony was filmed by James and his camera crews during the Society’s 2005, 2006 and 2007 International conventions and is interspersed with footage and other graphic elements provided by the Barbershop Harmony Society.

== Synopsis ==
American Harmony provides an in-depth look at the amazingly rich subculture of a true American art form. It follows the lives of some of the biggest names to emerge from international competition in the Society’s history, as well as providing interviews with many rank-and-file members, referred to as “Joe Barbershoppers.” The film features four prominent Barbershop Society quartets: OC Times, Max Q, Vocal Spectrum, and Reveille – over a span of years, on stage and at home, in their personal quests for international recognition.

"The film is a mixture of obsession, singing, zany comedy and nail-biting competition", according to writer/director, Aengus James.

=== Screening ===
The film was theatrically released in April 2009, and eventually made its way to 30 markets during 2009/2010. There is a Google pin map showing the markets where the film had a theatrical release.

=== DVD release ===
The DVD was made available in June 2010 through Abramorama, and re-released in September 2011 through Breaking Glass Pictures.

=== Festivals and awards ===
- Winner: Best Documentary at the 2009 San Diego Film Festival.
- Winner of the 2009 Honolulu Film Festival Silver Lei Award.
- Nominated for the 2008 International Documentary Association Best Music Documentary Award.
- Official selection for the Nashville Film Festival - Apr 16–23, 2009.
- Official selection for the Boulder International Film Festival - Feb 12–15, 2009.
- Official selection and Second Place Audience Choice award for the Sedona International Film Festival - Feb 24 – March 1, 2009.
- Official selection for the Waterfront Film Festival - June 2009.
- Official selection for the Three Rivers Film Festival - Nov 6–21, 2009.

== See also ==
- List of documentaries
- Barbershop music
