= I've Got My Eyes on You =

"I've Got My Eyes on You" can refer to:

- "I've Got My Eyes on You" (1939 song), a song by Cole Porter, popularized by Frank Sinatra and others
- "I've Got My Eyes on You," a 1966 song by Sonny Burgess, popularized by Gene Vincent
- "I've Got My Eyes on You" (1968 song), a song by Les Reed and Jackie Rae, popularized by Ray Conniff and by The Vogues
- "I've Got My Eyes on You," a 1999 song by J. Aberg and Paul Rein, popularized by Jessica Simpson in her album Sweet Kisses
