= Silly Boy =

Silly Boy may refer to:

- "Silly Boy (She Doesn't Love You)", a 1962 song by The Lettermen
- "Silly Boy" (Eva Simons song), 2009
- "Silly Boy", 2025 song by XO from Fashionably Late
