= Big Orange =

Big Orange may refer to:

- Big Orange/The Great Pumpkin, popular name for one Braniff Airways-operated Boeing 747, the 100th produced plane of its type
- Big Orange (horse), British thoroughbred racehorse
- Big Orange (South Australia), a "Big Thing" in Australia
- Big Orange Chorus, a barbershop men's chorus in Jacksonville, Florida
- Gibeau Orange Julep, a restaurant and roadside attraction in Montreal
- Los Angeles, a city in California, USA
- Tel Aviv, a city in Israel
- Tennessee Volunteers, the athletics programs (teams) of the University of Tennessee
  - Tennessee Volunteers football
