= OC Times =

Barbershop quartet

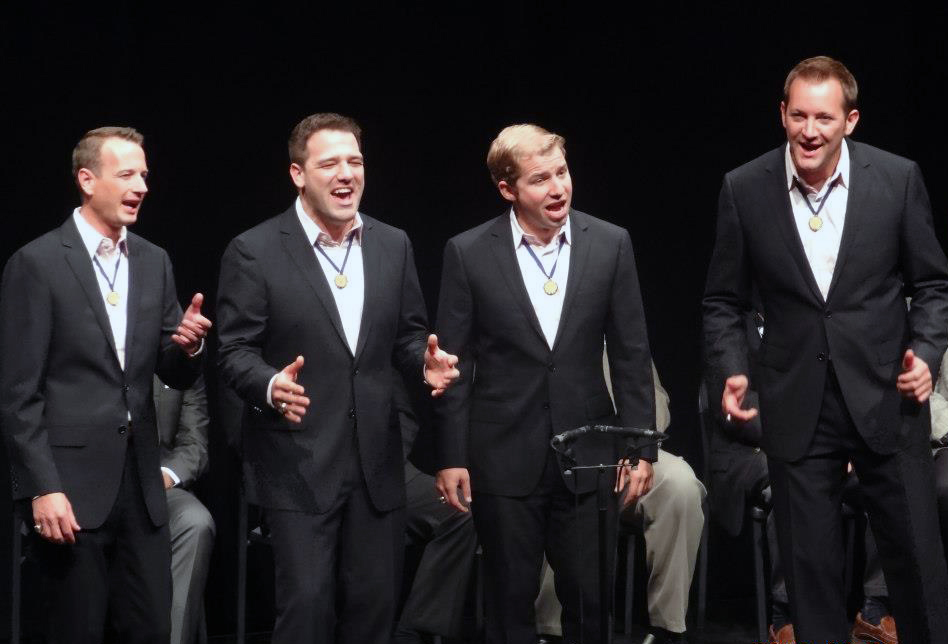
- OC Times performing in Auckland, New Zealand, in September 2012. From left to right: Shawn York, Sean Devine, Cory Hunt and Patrick Claypool.

Background information
- Origin: Orange County, California
- Genres: Barbershop
- Years active: 2003–present
- Members: Shawn York — tenor Sean Devine — lead Patrick Claypool — baritone Cory Hunt — bass (from 2005)
- Past members: Drew Harrah – bass (to 2004)
- Website: octimesquartet.com

OC Times is a barbershop quartet affiliated with the Barbershop Harmony Society. They earned second place silver medals at the International Barbershop Quartet Contest at Denver's Pepsi Center on July 7, 2007, and won the International Quartet Championship on July 5, 2008, in Nashville, Tennessee. The quartet combines traditional barbershop harmonies with contemporary music styles. The music of OC Times is inspired by artists like Michael Buble, Sinatra, and Elvis.

The quartet's run for the title is featured in the 2009 feature film American Harmony.

== Background ==
OC Times formed in the spring of 2003 and placed 18th out of 52 quartets in their first Barbershop Harmony Society international quartet competition. The quartet updated its image in January 2005 when Cory Hunt replaced Drew Harrah as the bass singer. With coaching by barbershop veteran Mark Hale, they dressed more casually and broadened their repertoire with non-traditional songs. OC Times' subsequent international competition placement jumped to 5th, 3rd, then 2nd before they won the championship in 2008.

The quartet has earned several other awards and accolades, including being chosen as the society's Far Western District champions in 2004. The group won the 2008 CARA Awards (Contemporary A cappella Recording Awards) for Best Barbershop Song and Best Barbershop Album for their sophomore release, Let's Fly.

All of OC Times are members of the Masters of Harmony, the 8-time gold medalist chorus (including 2011), and the 2007 and 2010 gold medalist Westminster Chorus.

== Members ==
- Shawn York – tenor; originally from Rescue, California, and earned his bachelor's degree in Music Education from Vanguard University. He also owns a Chick-fil-A restaurant in Corona, California.
- Sean Devine – lead; originally from Hershey, Pennsylvania, and a graduate of Azusa Pacific University with a degree in organizational leadership. Also sang in the quartet Sam's Club and the doo wop group The Alley Cats. Accepted a job with the Harmony Foundation in Nashville in July 2008.
- Patrick Claypool – baritone; General Manager for the Tigard, Oregon location of Din Tai Fung
- Cory Hunt – bass; a May 2008 graduate of the University of Nevada, Reno, and member of the Reno Silver Dollar Chorus. Landed a job with Environmental Incentives, a consulting firm in Lake Tahoe.

== Discography ==
- Let's Fly (CD; 2007)
- Destinations (CD; 2010)
- The Road (CD; 2014)

Preceded by Max Q	SPEBSQSA International Quartet Champions; 2008	Succeeded by Crossroads
