= Joe Connelly (musician) =

American singer (born 1965)

- Genres: Barbershop, a cappella
- Occupation(s): Singer, coach
- Instrument: Voice
- Member of: Old School
- Formerly of: Interstate Rivals, Keepsake, Platinum

Joe Connelly (born 1965) is a barbershop quartet lead singer, competition judge, chorus director, and full-time coach for various barbershop quartets. Connelly is the first man ever to have become a Barbershop Harmony Society International Championship gold medalist four times, first with Interstate Rivals in 1987 at the age of 22, then with Keepsake in 1992, with Platinum in 2000, and with Old School in 2011. In 2000, he had already become the first person to win the gold medal three times. Quartet-mate Tony DeRosa joined Connelly as a four-time gold medalist in 2017 (in Keepsake, Platinum, Max Q and Main Street). In 2024, De Rosa became the first person to become a 5-time gold medalist with his quartet Three and a Half Men. A few other singers have achieved the honor of being three-time champions, including quartet-mate Kipp Buckner (in The Gas House Gang, Interstate Rivals, and Old School).

He is the son of international quartet medalist Mike Connelly, baritone of The Roaring 20's. Joe directed the Southern Gateway chorus from 2008 until 2014. He was the director of Canadian Showtime Chorus in Ottawa, Ontario, from May 2018 to April 2023. He coaches men's and women's barbershop quartets and choruses around the world full-time, having become one of the few barbershoppers who has turned his hobby into a profession. He currently performs around the world with his quartet, Old School, which took the silver medal in international competition in 2009 and 2010, before winning the gold in 2011.

In 2022, Connelly was one of three individuals inducted into the Barbershop Harmony Society's Hall of Fame.
