= Joker's Wild (quartet) =

Barbershop quartet

- Genres: Barbershop
- Years active: 1990–2001, 2008–present
- Members: Steve Iannacchione – tenor Jon Clunies – lead Steve Legters – baritone Dave Kindinger – bass
- Past members: Mark Green – lead
- Website: Official site

Joker's Wild is a barbershop quartet formed in 1990 by Dave Kindinger and Mark Green from Columbus, Ohio, and Steve Legters and Stephen Iannacchione from Pittsburgh, Pennsylvania. Coached by Lance Heilmann, after winning the Johnny Appleseed District of the SPEBSQSA competition that fall, they went on to the SPEBSQSA's International contests, earning 10th place, 5th, 2nd, and finally the International Championship in Pittsburgh in 1994.

Jon Clunies replaced Mark Green as the lead singer in 1996.

They have toured widely, performing all over the world before they went on hiatus in June 2001.

== Discography ==
- Right From The Start (Cassette, CD; 1993)
- Chasing a Dream (Cassette, CD; 1996)
- More of the Different (CD; 2000)

Also appear on

- The Pittsburghers (Cassette, CD; 1998)
- Seems Like Old Times (CD; 1994)

Preceded by Gas House Gang	Barbershop Harmony Society International Quartet Champions; 1994	Succeeded by Marquis
