= Crossroads (quartet) =

Barbershop quartet

- Genres: Barbershop
- Years active: 2007–2022
- Members: Fred Farrell – tenor Mike Slamka – lead Brandon Guyton – baritone Jim Henry – bass
- Website: Official site

Crossroads is the barbershop quartet that won the International Quartet Championship for 2009 at the Barbershop Harmony Society's annual international convention, in Anaheim, California. Bass singer Jim Henry also directed the Ambassadors of Harmony chorus to their international championship at the same event with the highest chorus score ever obtained.

All four members had previously won the gold in other quartets. Henry had his first win with the 1993 champion Gas House Gang, while baritone Brandon Guyton previously sang in the 2002 champion quartet Four Voices. The lead part is sung by Mike Slamka, formerly of 2003 champion Power Play while tenor Fred Farrell won previously singing with 1989 champion Second Edition.

This quartet should not be confused with the unrelated gospel quartet of the same name, founded in 1960 in Russell Springs, Kentucky, which includes Vernie McGaha, a former member of the Kentucky State Senate, as its lead singer and pianist.

Crossroads was awarded "Quartet of the Year" in May 2018 by the inaugural A Cappella Music Awards program.

== Discography ==
- Crossroads (CD; 2009)
- That Lucky Old Sun (CD; 2011)
- The Simple Life (CD; 2014)
- How Can I Keep From Singing (CD; 2018)

Preceded by OC Times	SPEBSQSA International Quartet Champions; 2009	Succeeded by Storm Front
