= After Hours (quartet) =

American barbershop quartet

- Genre: Barbershop
- Members: Tim Beutel – tenor Drew Ochoa – lead Bryan Ziegler – baritone Dan Wessler – bass
- Past members: Ben Harding - lead Kevin McClelland - baritone
- Website: afterhoursqt.com

After Hours is an American barbershop quartet that won the 2018 Barbershop Harmony Society International Quartet Championship held in Orlando, Florida. They were founded in 2007 and originally based in Illinois. Their current members are based in Illinois, Wisconsin, and Florida.

== History ==
The quartet began in 2007 at Bradley University in Peoria, Illinois. They first performed at the Bradley Chorale talent show, with the quartet at the time including current members Tim Beutel and Dan Wessler, as well as Kevin McClelland and Ben Harding. Bryan Ziegler and Drew Ochoa replaced McClelland and Harding respectively.

With an overall score of 94.7% at the 2018 International Quartet Championship, they are the highest scoring quartet to win since the change in scoring in 1993.

Outside of the quartet, Beutel and Wessler both work as high school choir directors, Ochoa performs at Walt Disney World and Ziegler runs a coffee and bagel shop.

== Awards ==
- 2018 International 1st Place Medalists
- 2017 International 3rd Place Medalists
- 2011 International Collegiate 3rd Place Medalists
- 2010 Illinois District Champions

== Discography ==
- Half Past Eight (CD; 2012)
- All Night Long (CD; 2014)
- One Minute to Midnight (CD; 2017)
- The Next Ten Minutes (CD; 2019)
- Passing the Time (EP; 2020)

Preceded by Main Street	SPEBSQSA International Quartet Champions; 2018	Succeeded by Signature
