= Tony Butala =

American singer (1938–2026)

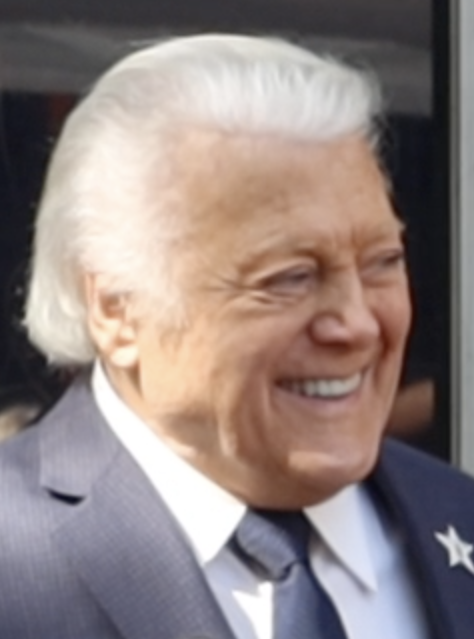
- Butala in 2020

Background information
- Born: Anthony Francis Butala; November 20, 1938; Sharon, Pennsylvania, U.S.
- Died: November 1, 2026 (aged 87) Manitowoc, Wisconsin, U.S.
- Occupation: Singer
- Years active: 1958–2019
- Formerly of: The Lettermen
- Spouses: Judith Ann Blaskovich (m. 1969; div. 1984) Greta Fosse (m. 1984; div. 1995) Julia Anne Twichell (m. 1995; died 2017)

Anthony Francis Butala (November 20, 1938 – November 1, 2026) was an American singer. He was the lead singer of the vocal group The Lettermen from 1958 until his retirement in 2019. Butala was the last surviving of the original three members. The Lettermen received a star on the Hollywood Walk of Fame in February 2020.

== Early life ==
Butala was born in Sharon, Pennsylvania, the eighth of eleven children of Mary Ann (Ference) and John George Butala. Butala's family was of Croatian descent, from the Žumberak region of Croatia. He spent much of his early years on a farm owned by his grandparents, enjoying a rural upbringing which included deer hunting. Butala said in a radio interview that hunting in those days was done more out of survival, rather than sport as it is today. He shot his first deer at the age of 12.

== Career ==
Butala began his professional singing career in 1948, when he appeared on Starlets on Parade, a Saturday morning show on KDKA radio in Pittsburgh. He quickly became a favorite in and around his hometown of Sharon during his pre-teen years.

In 1951, Butala's mother, who was a nurse, was called to California to assist her sister, who had been stricken with pneumonia and needed assistance with her children while she recovered. Butala's father, believing that there could be opportunities for his son on the West Coast, suggested that Tony accompany his mother to California, where he joined the Robert Mitchell Boys Choir and performed with the choir through 1954. His notable works during this period included providing the singing voice for Lost Boy Fox/Slightly in the Disney animated film Peter Pan (1953).

Butala's tenure with the boys' choir ended as his voice naturally changed as he entered his teen years. However, Mitchell, retained him as assistant choir director and paid for his private education as he continued his show business career. As a teenager, Butala sang with a quartet called "The Fourmost", which included Concetta Ingolia, who would later be known as Connie Stevens. Though the group would later disband, for Tony, it laid the foundation of what would become known as The Lettermen.

The first unofficial incarnation of The Lettermen came in 1958, with Butala, Mike Barnett, and Talmadge Russell, who would later be replaced by Jerry Paul. That same year, Gary Clark and Jimmy Blaine followed, and that combination made its first recording, but it was not successful. Butala tried again with two new singers, Bob Engemann and Jim Pike. This lineup brought the group its first success, as The Lettermen scored their first Top 40 hit at #13 on the U.S. charts in 1961 with "The Way You Look Tonight". This cover of Fred Astaire's 1936 song went gold in the U.S.

The Lettermen's success included two Top 10 singles (both No. 7), 16 Top 10 singles on the Adult Contemporary chart (including one No. 1), 32 consecutive Billboard chart albums, 11 gold records, and four Grammy nominations. The group became known for their romantic ballads and characteristic three-voice harmonic singing.

From the 1970s through the 2010s, the Lettermen have enjoyed sustained success in the Philippines due to their performances of traditional Tagalog-language kundimans such as "Dahil Sa Iyo", "Sapagka Kami Ay Tao Lamang", "Ikaw", and "Hindi Kita Malimot". The group toured the country in 2006.

After the retirements of Pike and Engemann, Butala reformed the band's lineup with many new members including Donovan Tea, Mark Preston and Bobby Poynton.

On February 24, 2020, the Lettermen were honored with a star on the Hollywood Walk of Fame. They were nominated by the group’s fan club, the Lettermen Friends Fan Club. At the ceremony, Butala gave a speech thanking his family, friends, and colleagues who have contributed to his success, as well as the band's fans for their continued support throughout the years.

=== Retirement ===
Butala announced his retirement from full-time touring with the band in 2019, the same year Pike died at the age of 82 from complications related to Parkinson's disease. However, Butala still maintained a background presence with the group and occasionally made guest appearances, the last being in 2025.

== Business interests ==
Butala also owned Butala Vineyards, which he started from a ranch in Chatsworth, California, which he purchased in 1969. Less than 20 years later, he purchased another ranch along the southern Vaca Mountain Range, which is along the eastern border of the Napa Valley. He first began selling wine commercially in 1992 under the Castlebrooke label, and continued to produce both wine and grapes for other winemakers as well. Butala was friends with fellow Croatian-American winemaker Mike Grgić, who also did business in the Napa Valley.

In 1998, Butala founded the Vocal Group Hall of Fame, a museum that honors vocal groups from the United States. The museum is headquartered in Butala's hometown of Sharon, Pennsylvania.

== Personal life and death ==
Butala married the former Judith Ann Blaskovich in 1969. The couple divorced in 1984, but both remained friendly until Judith's death in a car collision on October 10, 2006, aged 60. He had four children. Butala married Julia Anne Twichell in 1995.

=== Involvement in Croatian-American community ===
Throughout his career, Butala was a prominent figure in the Croatian-American community and became involved in philanthropy and related Croatian projects. He has organized 15 Croatian wine tastings as fundraisers for the Croatian-American community. He has met with prominent Croatian and Croatian-American figures, including former Croatian President Kolinda Grabar-Kitarović, recording artist and composer Nenad Bač, and contemporary singer Tommi Mischell.

In 2016, he was honored by the National Federation of Croatian Americans Cultural Foundation (NFCACF) with the NFCACF Lifetime Achievement Award, in which he was recognized for his "long-time and amazingly serious commitment to Croatian causes."

=== Death ===
Butala died on November 1, 2026, in Manitowoc, Wisconsin. He was 87 years old. The band published an official commemoration on their Facebook page on November 1. A cause of death has not yet been determined. The Lettermen also published a tribute video to their YouTube channel on November 3.
