= Till (The Vogues album) =

Studio album by The Vogues
- Released: January 1969 (U.S.) / May 1969 (U.K.)
- Recorded: 1968
- Genre: Pop, rock
- Label: Reprise
- Producer: Dick Glasser

The Vogues chronology
Turn Around, Look at Me (1968)	Till (1969)	Memories (1969)

Till is the fourth studio album by The Vogues, released by Reprise Records in 1969 under catalog number RS 6326.

The album was reissued, combined with their 1968 album Turn Around, Look at Me, on Compact disc by Taragon Records on November 6, 2001.

== Track listing ==
Track number	Title	Songwriter(s)
1	"I've Got My Eyes on You"	Jackie Rae/Les Reed
2	"I Will"	Dick Glasser
3	"On Broadway"	Jerry Leiber/Barry Mann/Mike Stoller/Cynthia Weil
4	"I'll Know My Love (By the Way She Talks)"	Buddy Kaye/Lee Jones
5	"A Taste of Honey"	Bobby Scott/Ric Marlow
6	"Till"	Charles Danvers/Pierre Buisson/Carl Sigman
7	"She Was Too Good to Me"	Richard Rodgers/Lorenz Hart
8	"No, Not Much"	Robert Allen/Al Stillman
9	"The Sun Shines out of Your Shoes"	Tony Hatch/Jackie Trent
10	"Woman Helping Man"	Mark Charron
