= I Had a Dream =

I Had a Dream may refer to:

- I Had a Dream (Dexter), an episode of the American television series Dexter
- "I Had a Dream" (John Sebastian song), 1970
- "I Had A Dream" (Johnnie Taylor song), 1967
- "I Had a Dream" (Kelly Clarkson song), 2015
- "I Had a Dream" (Paul Revere & the Raiders song), 1967
- "I Had a Dream, Joe", a 1992 song by Nick Cave and the Bad Seeds
- I Had a Dream That You Were Mine, a 2016 album by Hamilton Leithauser and Rostam

== See also ==
- I Have a Dream (disambiguation)
- I Too Had a Dream, an autobiography by Indian dairy engineer and entrepreneur Verghese Kurien
