= Spin Away =

Studio album by The Lettermen
- Released: 1972
- Genre: Traditional pop
- Label: Capitol
- Producer: Ed Cobb

The Lettermen chronology
| Lettermen 1 (1972) | Spin Away (1972) | A Time for Us (1972) |

Spin Away is an album of cover songs done by the pop music group The Lettermen, released in 1972 by Capitol Records. The album was produced by Ed Cobb and the Lettermen. Vocal arrangements were by Vince Morton and Lettermen.

== Track listing ==
| Song title | Writer | Arrangement |
|---|---|---|
| A1. Spin Away (2:57) | Alan O'Day | Perry Botkin, Jr. |
| A2. Words (3:25) | B. Gibb, R. Gibb, M. Gibb | Jimmie Haskell |
| A3. Love Song (3:15) | Leslie Duncan | Perry Botkin, Jr. |
| A4. Precious and Few (3:05) | Walter D. Nims | Mort Garson |
| A5. The Summer Knows (3:00) | M. Legrand, M. Bergman, A. Bergman | Jimmie Haskell |
| B1. Sandman (3:25) | Dewey Bunnell | Perry Botkin, Jr. |
| B2. Baby I'm A Want You (3:05) | David Gates | Mort Garson |
| B3. Everything That Touches You (3:00) | Terry Kirkman | Perry Botkin, Jr. |
| B4. Maybe We Should (3:00) | Vince Morton | Vince Morton |
| B5a/b. Don't Leave Me/Without Her (Medley) (3:35) | Harry Nilsson | Vocal: Pat Valentino, Music: Perry Botkin, Jr. |

== Personnel ==
=== Musicians ===
- Keyboards: Vince Morton, Michael Lang, Michael Melvoin and Michael Omartian
- Guitars: Richard Bennet and David Cohen
- Bass: Emory Gordy, Jr.
- Drums: Dennis St. John, Jimmy Gordon and Colin Bailey
- Percussion: Gary Coleman

== Production ==
- Production coordinator: Billy Delbert
- Personal Management: Jess Rand
- Recorded at Producer's Workshop, Hollywood, California
- Engineers: Edd Cobb and Tom Knox
