= Memories (The Vogues album) =

Studio album by The Vogues
- Released: August 1968
- Genre: Pop, rock
- Label: Reprise
- Producer: Dick Glasser

The Vogues chronology
Till (1969)	Memories (1968)	The Vogues' Greatest Hits (1969)

Memories is the fifth studio LP album by The Vogues, released by Reprise Records in 1969 under catalog number RS 6347.

The album was reissued, combined with their 1970 album, [The Vogues Sing the Good Old Songs, on compact disc by Taragon Records on November 6, 2001.

== Track listing ==
Track number	Title	Songwriter(s)
1	"Earth Angel (Will You Be Mine)"	Curtis Williams/Jesse Belvin/Gaynel Hodge
2	"Standing on the Corner"	Frank Loesser
3	"Shangri-La"	Carl Sigman/Matt Malneck/Robert Maxwell
4	"Time After Time"	Sammy Cahn/Jule Styne
5	"Love Is a Many-Splendored Thing"	Sammy Fain/Paul Francis Webster
6	"P.S. I Love You"	Johnny Mercer/Gordon Jenkins
7	"If I Loved You"	Richard Rodgers/Oscar Hammerstein II
8	"Once in a While"	Michael Edwards/Bud Green
9	"Since I Don't Have You"	James Beaumont/Janet Vogel/Joseph Verscharen/Walter Lester/John Taylor/Lennie Martin/Joseph Rock
10	"Moments to Remember"	Robert Allen/Al Stillman
