= Michigan Jake =

Barbershop quartet

- Origin: Louisville, Kentucky
- Genres: Barbershop
- Years active: 1995–2004
- Past members: Drew Kirkman – tenor (since 1998); Mark Hale – lead; Joel Wilson – baritone (since 1998); Greg Hollander – bass; Christopher Hale – tenor (to 1998); Gary Davis – baritone (to 1998)
- Website: Official site

Michigan Jake was a barbershop quartet that formed in 1995. The quartet borrowed the name from Michigan J. Frog, the singing frog in the 1955 Merrie Melodies short One Froggy Evening.

The original line-up comprised the section leaders of the Louisville Times chorus of Louisville, Kentucky. After a few changes in the line-up, Michigan Jake won the 2001 International Quartet Contest in Nashville, along with becoming the first barbershop quartet to win a Harmony Award from the Vocal Group Hall of Fame. They announced their retirement on July 1, 2004.

== Discography ==
- Steppin Out with the Louisville Times Chorus (CD, cassette; 1997)
- For the Record (CD/cassette; 2000)
- How Rhythm Was Born (CD; 2004)

Preceded by Platinum	SPEBSQSA International Quartet Champions; 2001	Succeeded by Four Voices
