= Jim Henry (singer) =

American singer and educator

- Born: May 16, 1964 (age 61)
- Genres: Barbershop, a cappella
- Occupations: Singer, coach, professor
- Instrument: Voice
- Member of: Ambassadors of Harmony, Crossroads
- Formerly of: Gas House Gang

James Earl Henry (born 1964) is a vocal music professor, barbershop bass singer, and co-director of the Ambassadors of Harmony (AOH). He is a multiple international award-winning quartet member, whose quartets have appeared nationally on the NBC, PBS, and Fox television networks. Henry is the current director of choral studies at the University of Missouri–St. Louis and a contributing author of widely used musical reference works.

== Early life ==
Henry grew up in St. Charles, Missouri and currently lives in St. Peters. He was 11 years old when he wrote a letter to the Daniel Boone Chorus begging to join. Henry soon became its youngest member. In 1981, notable arranger David Wright joined the chorus as director and set the chorus on a path to excellence. About that same time, Henry met a transformative choir teacher and chose to make vocal music his life's work. He graduated in 1986 from Southeast Missouri State in Cape Girardeau, Missouri and then completed his doctorate in music composition from Washington University in St. Louis in 2000.

== Career ==
Henry is the Director of Choral Studies at the University of Missouri–St. Louis (UMSL), where he conducts Vocal Point and the University Singers. He teaches choral methods, choral arranging, and choral conducting. From 2013 to 2016, Henry was the chair of the music department at the university. He is the clinician for the Acappellooza Fall field trips and Acappellooza Summer music camps, both partnerships between UMSL and AOH. He was previously head of the choral music department at Lindenwood University for nine years, during which time the University Chorus quintupled in size under his leadership. He also formed Voices Only, an a cappella ensemble that performed at the 2004 Missouri Music Educators Association conference, toured Germany, Holland and Sweden, and produced a recording. While at Lindenwood, he also taught and mentored 2004 Collegiate BHS Champions Vocal Spectrum (who went on to be 2006 Barbershop Harmony Society (BHS) International champions).

== Barbershop singing ==
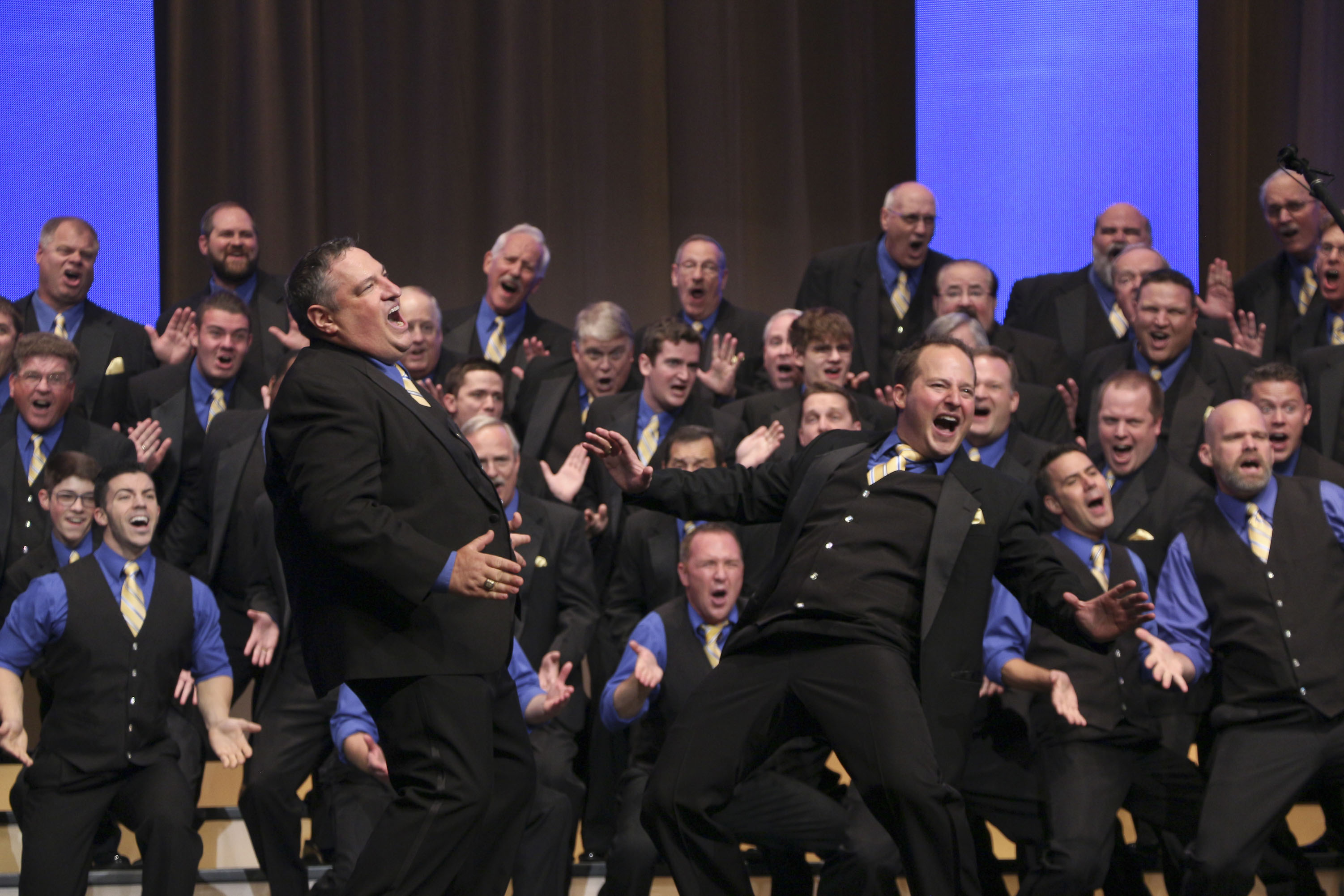
The Ambassadors of Harmony in Nashville performing their 2016 BHS Gold Medal-winning set

Henry is the musical and artistic co-director of the five-time BHS international champion chorus, the Ambassadors of Harmony, a 130-voice men's a cappella ensemble. He took over the reins of direction of the chorus from David Wright in 1990, and since 2013 has co-directed with Jonny Moroni.

He most recently sang bass with and arranged for Crossroads, 2009 BHS International Quartet Champions. Crossroads performed worldwide, appeared in television and radio broadcasts, and produced three albums. Henry, along with Brandon Guyton, Mike Slamka, and Fred Farrell formed Crossroads in 2007 as a traditional barbershop harmony quartet, a cappella music styles. Crossroads performed worldwide, and also appeared on national TV programs such as Fox & Friends Weekend.

Henry was previously the bass of the Gas House Gang, 1993 International Quartet Champions. The Gas House Gang produced five albums, performed in all fifty states and fifteen countries. Their television appearances and radio broadcasts include NBC's Today Show, NPR's Present at the Creation, and PBS specials.

Henry travels worldwide as a guest conductor, coach, and lecturer. His doctoral thesis was on the origins of barbershop harmony. He is a contributing author for the Encyclopedia of American Gospel Music and the Grove Dictionary of American Music. Henry also served as bass section leader for the Saint Louis Symphony Chorus.

== Awards ==
- 2023: Barbershop Harmony Society International Chorus Championship as Co-Director of the Ambassadors of Harmony
- 2019: Inducted to the Hall of Fame of the Barbershop Harmony Society
- 2016: Stand for Music Award from the National Association for Music Education – Crossroads
- 2016: Barbershop Harmony Society International Chorus Championship as Co-Director of the Ambassadors of Harmony
- 2015: Selected as bass of the BHS Fantasy Gold Quartet with lead Mike Slamka, tenor Tim Waurick, and baritone Tony DeRosa
- 2013: Joe Liles Lifetime Achievement Award – Barbershop Harmony Society
- 2012: Contemporary A Cappella Recording Award – Best Barbershop Song (That Lucky Old Sun) – Crossroads
- 2012: Barbershop Harmony Society International Chorus Championship as Director of the Ambassadors of Harmony
- 2011: International Leadership Network Dare to Lead Award
- 2010: Missouri Governor's Award for Excellence in Teaching
- 2009: Barbershop Harmony Society International Quartet Championship – Crossroads
- 2009: Barbershop Harmony Society International Chorus Championship as Director of the Ambassadors of Harmony
- 2008: Inducted to Hall of Fame of the Barbershop Harmony Society – with The Gas House Gang
- 2007: Outstanding District Director Award from the Missouri Choral Directors Association
- 2005: Inducted to Hall of Fame of the Central States District (BHS)
- 2004: Barbershop Harmony Society International Chorus Championship as Director of the Ambassadors of Harmony
- 2001: Contemporary A Cappella Recording Award – Best Holiday Song (Go Tell It On The Mountain) – The Gas House Gang
- 1999: Inducted to Hall of Fame of the Central States District (BHS) – with The Gas House Gang
- 1997: Contemporary A Cappella Recording Award – Best Barbershop Song (Strike Up The Band Medley) – The Gas House Gang
- 1993: Barbershop Harmony Society International Quartet Championship – The Gas House Gang
