= Stormfront =

Stormfront may refer to:

- A weather front
- Stormfront (website), a white nationalist, white supremacist and neo-Nazi Internet message forum; notable for being the first major hate website
- Stormfront Studios, a video game developer
- Stormfront, a set from the Pokémon Trading Card Game
- Stormfront Troopers, the antagonists of Kung Fu Pork Choppers
- Stormfront (The Boys), a character from comic book series The Boys, by Garth Ennis

== See also ==
- Storm Front (disambiguation)
