= How Is Julie? =

Single by The Lettermen

from the album Once Upon a Time
- B-side: "Turn Around, Look at Me"
- Released: 1962
- Length: 1:56
- Label: Capitol
- Songwriter(s): Eddy Carroll, Barry DeVorzon

The Lettermen singles chronology
"Come Back Silly Girl" (1962)	"How Is Julie?" / "Turn Around, Look at Me" (1962)	"Silly Boy (She Doesn't Love You)" (1962)

Professional ratings
"Turn Around, Look at Me" / "How Is Julie?"
Review scores
Source	Rating
Billboard	positive

"How Is Julie?" is a song written by Eddy Carroll (Eddie Carroll) and Barry DeVorzon.

== Background ==
The song's lyrics describe the singer's anguish as Julie, whom he loved, has left him.

== Chart performance ==
In 1962, The Lettermen released it as a single from their album Once Upon a Time. The song continued their streak of top forty hits on Billboard's easy listening chart and just missed the top forty of the Billboard Hot 100.

Chart (1962)	Peak position
U.S. Billboard Easy Listening	16
U.S. Billboard Hot 100	42
