= Silly Boy (She Doesn't Love You) =

Single by The Lettermen

from the album Jim, Tony, and Bob
- B-side: "I Told the Stars"
- Released: 1962
- Length: 2:44
- Label: Capitol
- Songwriter(s): Dave Burgess, Marnie Thomas

The Lettermen singles chronology
"How Is Julie?" / "Turn Around, Look at Me" (1962)	"Silly Boy (She Doesn't Love You)" (1962)	"Again" (1962)

"Silly Boy (She Doesn't Love You)" is a song written by Dave Burgess and Marnie Thomas. It was recorded by The Lettermen in 1962 for their album Jim, Tony, and Bob.

== Background ==
The lyrics describe the singer's inability to move on after an amorous relationship ends.

== Chart performance ==
In 1962, "Silly Boy (She Doesn't Love You)" was released as a single. It became a minor hit on the Billboard Hot 100, reaching number 81.
