= I Have a Dream (disambiguation) =

"I Have a Dream" is a 1963 speech by Martin Luther King, Jr.

I Have a Dream may also refer to:

== Music ==
- I Have a Dream (oratorio), by James Furman, 1970

=== Albums ===
- I Have a Dream (Cristy Lane album), 1981
- I Have a Dream (It Feels Like Home), by the City Harmonic, 2011
- I Have a Dream, by the Checkers, 1991
- I Have a Dream, or the title song, by Solomon Burke, 1974
- I Have a Dream, an EP by Group 1 Crew, 2006

=== Songs ===
- "I Have a Dream" (song), by ABBA, 1979; covered Cristy Lane (1981), Westlife (1999), and others
- "I Have a Dream"/"Bellissima", by DJ Quicksilver, 1996
- "I Have a Dream", by Herbie Hancock from The Prisoner
- "I Have a Dream", by Manafest from Reborn

== See also ==
- I Have a Dream Foundation, a charitable trust founded by Eugene Lang
- I Have Dreamed (disambiguation)
- I Had a Dream (disambiguation)
- "I've Got a Dream", a 2010 song from the film Tangled
- On mulla unelma (I have a dream), by Sielun Veljet
