= Tim Waurick =

American singer

- Born: Levittown, Pennsylvania, US
- Genres: Barbershop
- Occupations: Singer, recording artist, coach
- Member of: Ambassadors of Harmony, Vocal Spectrum
- Website: timtracks.com

Tim Waurick is a barbershop tenor singer and coach for various barbershop choruses and quartets. Waurick creates learning tracks – recordings in which one part is dominant and the others are sung softly in the background – for the Barbershop Harmony Society, Sweet Adelines International, and various other quartets and choruses around the world. His learning track company is named TimTracks. Waurick is one of the few barbershop enthusiasts who has managed to turn his hobby into a profession. He is known for his broad vocal range and his ability to hold notes for long periods of time.

== Barbershop ==
Waurick grew up in Levittown, Pennsylvania, where he began singing barbershop at about age 12. Since 2003, he performs with the quartet Vocal Spectrum, who won gold medals in the collegiate Barbershop Quartet Contest in 2004 and the International Barbershop Quartet Contest in 2006. He graduated in 2007 from Lindenwood University in St. Charles, Missouri.

In 2009, Waurick and other members of the Ambassadors of Harmony chorus gave seven performances of The Music Man at The Muny amphitheater in St. Louis. Waurick played tenor Jacey Squires in the show's featured quartet. Waurick serves as tenor section leader of the Ambassadors, who are five-time International Barbershop Chorus Champions.

In December 2009, Waurick posted a video of himself singing nine octaves, echoing notes he played on a piano. The range of an average singer is three and one-third octaves.

Waurick has released several solo multi-track albums. He describes various details of his early barbershop years and track recording, as well as some 2019 vocal surgery, in a 2020 "Let's Talk Barbershop" podcast.

== Honors ==
Waurick was selected in 2008 to be tenor of a Fantasy Gold Quartet, together with bass Jeff Oxley, baritone Tony DeRosa, and lead Joe Connelly; then again in 2015 with lead Mike Slamka, bass Jim Henry, and baritone Tony DeRosa. In 2022, Waurick was inducted into the Barbershop Harmony Society's Hall of Fame, along with DeRosa and Connelly; Waurick's quartet, Vocal Spectrum, was inducted the following year.

== Discography ==
- 2006 – Vocal Spectrum
- 2008 – Vocal Spectrum II
- 2010 – TimTracks
- 2011 – Vocal Spectrum III
- 2012 – Higher
- 2013 – Vocal Spectrum IV
- 2014 – Features
- 2016 – Tribute
- 2016 – Vocal Spectrum V
- 2021 – Fly Again
- 2026 – Vocal Spectrum VI
