= I've Got My Eyes on You (1968 song) =

Pop song written by Rae and Reed

"I've Got My Eyes on You" is a popular song by Jackie Rae and Les Reed, published in 1968.

The song was recorded by a number of artists:

- Jason Cord (Chapter One, 1968)
- Ray Conniff (Columbia single 4–44724, 1968) His version reached No. 23 on the Billboard Easy Listening chart.
- P. J. Proby (on 1968 album titled What's Wrong with My World in the United States, Believe It or Not in the United Kingdom)
- The Vogues (on 1969 album Till)
- Petula Clark (on 1971 album Warm and Tender)
