= Eddie Carroll =

Canadian actor

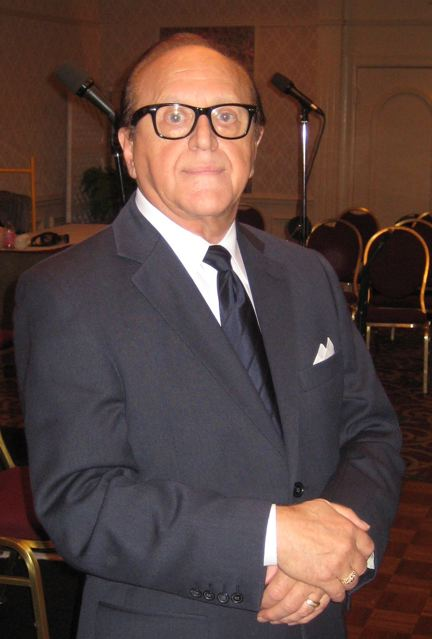
- Born: Edward Eleniak; September 5, 1933; Smoky Lake, Alberta, Canada
- Died: April 6, 2010 (aged 76); Woodland Hills, California, U.S.
- Other name: Eddy Carroll
- Occupation: Actor
- Years active: 1956–2010
- Spouse: Carolyn Springer (m. 1963)
- Children: 2

Eddie Carroll (born Edward Eleniak; September 5, 1933 – April 6, 2010) was a Canadian actor, who is best known as the third performer to provide the voice for Jiminy Cricket, a role he played for over 35 years.

== Career ==
In Canada, Carroll studied at the Orion theater with fellow student Robert Goulet. After moving to Hollywood in 1956 to work for NBC as a writer and producer, living as a resident alien in the United States, he was drafted into the US Army. He performed with the Armed Forces Radio Service and the 6th Army Chorus. In 1959, he took the professional name Eddie Carroll. In 1960 Carroll released a comedy album, "On Fraternity Row." In 1962, he co-wrote the song "How Is Julie?" which was recorded by The Lettermen. Starting in the early 1960s, Carroll appeared in numerous television programs and commercials. In 1970, he and business partner Jamie Farr developed and syndicated a sports-talk program, "Man to Man", through MGM Television, and not long after a Saturday morning animated series for Hanna-Barbera, The Amazing Chan and the Chan Clan.

Carroll took over the role of Jiminy Cricket for Walt Disney Productions in 1973 after the death of original voice actor Cliff Edwards in 1971, and a brief stint by Clarence Nash. From 1983 until his death in 2010, he traveled with two one-man shows portraying comedian Jack Benny: "A Small Eternity with Jack Benny" and "Jack Benny: Laughter in Bloom." From 1995 to 1996, Carroll toured with a production of The Odd Couple. In later years, he attended numerous conventions and gatherings for both Disney fans and devotees of old-time radio.

Eddie Carroll was sometimes billed as Eddy Carroll. He is not to be confused with British big band musician Eddie Carroll.

== Personal life and death ==
Carroll married his wife Carolyn Springer on April 7, 1963; together they had two children, Tina and Leland.

On April 6, 2010, Carroll died from a brain tumor at the Motion Picture & Television Country House and Hospital in Woodland Hills, California, at the age of 76, just one day before his 47th wedding anniversary.

== Filmography ==
=== Film ===
List of voice performances in direct-to-video and feature films
Year	Title	Role	Notes
1979	Parts: The Clonus Horror	Doctor	
1983	Mickey's Christmas Carol	Ghost of Christmas Past (Jiminy Cricket) (voice)	
1986	Jiminy Cricket's Christmas	Jiminy Cricket (voice)	Uncredited
1986	Jiminy Cricket: Storyteller	Jiminy Cricket (voice)	
1987	Disney Sing-Along-Songs: The Bare Necessities	Jiminy Cricket (voice)	
1988	Disney Sing-Along-Songs: Very Merry Christmas Songs	Jiminy Cricket (voice)	
1992	Disney Sing-Along-Songs: Be Our Guest	Jiminy Cricket (voice)	
1993	Disney Sing-Along-Songs: Friend Like Me	Jiminy Cricket (voice)	
1993	Princess and the Cobbler	The Theif (voice)	
1994	Disney Sing-Along-Songs: Circle of Life	Jimmy Cricket (voice)	
2001	Mickey's Magical Christmas: Snowed in at the House of Mouse	Jimmy Cricket (voice)	

=== Television ===
List of performances in television shows
Year	Title	Role	Notes
1963	The Lieutenant	Martin	Episode: "Alert!"
1963–67	The Hollywood Palace	Himself	Various episodes
1966	Gomer Pyle, U.S.M.C.	Sergeant Lubik	2 episodes
1966	The Last of the Secret Agents	Slate Boy	Uncredited
1966	Mission: Impossible	Street Photographer	Episode: "Memory"
1967	That Girl	Sheldon	Episode: "You Have to Know Someone to be Unknown"
1967	The Andy Griffith Show	Airport Clerk	Episode: "A Trip to Mexico"
1967	Judd for the Defense	Art Riley	Episode: "To Love and Stand Mute"
1970–71	The Don Knotts Show	Himself	3 episodes
1972	Sanford and Son	Bartender	Episode: "Happy Birthday, Pop"
1973	The Mary Tyler Moore Show	Emcee	Episode: "Put on a Happy Face"
1973	The Girl With Something Extra	Second Dealer	Episode: "How Green was Las Vegas"
1973–75	Maude	Earl / Eddie / Harry	3 episodes
1977	The Wonderful World of Color	Jiminy Cricket (voice)	Episode: "From All of Us to All of You"
2000	Frasier	Lee Zeplowitz	Episode: "The Bad Son"
2001–02	Disney's House of Mouse	Jiminy Cricket (voice)	3 episodes

=== Video games ===
List of voice performances in video games
Year	Title	Role	Notes
1999	Disney's Villains' Revenge	Jiminy Cricket (voice)	
2000	Walt Disney World Quest: Magical Racing Tour	Jiminy Cricket (voice)	
2002	Kingdom Hearts	Jiminy Cricket (voice)	
2006	Kingdom Hearts II	Jiminy Cricket (voice)	
2008	Kingdom Hearts Re:Chain of Memories	Jiminy Cricket (voice)	Final role
2013	Kingdom Hearts HD 1.5 Remix	Jiminy Cricket (voice)	Archive recordings
2014	Kingdom Hearts HD 2.5 Remix	Jiminy Cricket (voice)	Archive recordings

=== Theme parks ===
List of voice performances in theme parks
Year	Title	Role	Notes
1992	Fantasmic!	Jiminy Cricket	Voice
