= Turn Around, Look at Me (album) =

Studio album by The Vogues
- Released: August 1968
- Genre: Pop
- Label: Reprise
- Producer: Dick Glasser

The Vogues chronology
Five O'Clock World (1966)	Turn Around, Look at Me (1968)	Till (1969)

Turn Around, Look at Me is the third studio album by The Vogues. It was their debut album for Reprise Records in 1968, after their previous label, the Pittsburgh based Co & Ce Records, folded.

The album was reissued, combined with the 1969 Vogues album Till, in compact disc format, by Taragon Records on November 6, 2001. The re-issue producer was Eliot Goshman.

== Track listing ==
Track number	Title	Songwriter(s)
1	"I Keep It Hid"	Jimmy Webb
2	"It's Getting Better"	Barry Mann/Cynthia Weil
3	"So This Is Love"	Herb Newman
4	"Just Say Goodbye"	Petula Clark/Pierre Delanoé/Tony Hatch
5	"Dream Baby (How Long Must I Dream)"	Cindy Walker
6	"The Impossible Dream"	Joe Darion/Mitch Leigh
7	"My Special Angel"	Jimmy Duncan
8	"Come into My Arms Again"	Barbara Ruskin
9	"No Sun Today"	Fred Anisfield/James Last/Scott English
10	"She Is Today"	Barry Mann/Cynthia Weil
11	"Then"	Jimmy Webb
12	"Turn Around, Look at Me"	Jerry Capehart

== External reference ==
- Turn Around, Look At Me on Rate Your Music site
