= The Lettermen =

American male pop vocal trio

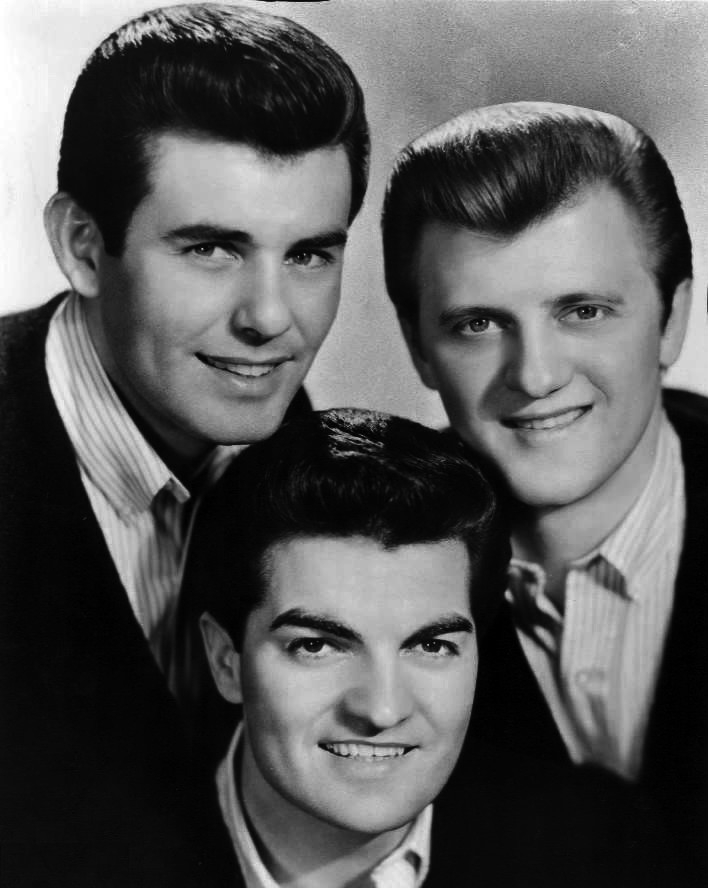
- The Lettermen in 1964: Jim Pike, Bob Engemann, Tony Butala

Background information
- Origin: Las Vegas, Nevada, U.S.
- Genres: Pop, vocal pop
- Years active: 1958–present
- Label: Capitol

The Lettermen are an American male pop vocal trio whose trademark is close-harmony pop songs with light arrangements. The group started in 1959. They have had two Top 10 singles (both No. 7), 16 Top 10 singles on the Adult Contemporary chart (including one No. 1), 32 consecutive Billboard chart albums, 11 gold records, and four Grammy nominations.

== History ==
In 1958, the stage revue Newcomers of 1928 was produced, a nostalgia act which starred 1920s stars Paul Whiteman, Buster Keaton, Rudy Vallée, Harry Richman, and Fifi D'Orsay. The show required three male singers to impersonate The Rhythm Boys, the vocal group that traveled with Whiteman and his orchestra in the late 1920s, and gave Bing Crosby his initial fame. The three singers selected were Mike Barnett, Dick Stewart, and Tony Butala. Jackie Barnett, who was chief comedy writer for the Jimmy Durante TV show, had auditioned the singers, and he decided to name the group "The Lettermen" for the show, as a nod to the large number of vocal groups in the 1950s who had school-related names (such as The Four Freshmen, The Four Preps, the Brothers Four and Danny & the Juniors). Newcomers of 1928 opened on February 28, 1958, at the Desert Inn in Las Vegas, Nevada. They played to sell-out audiences and were held over for many weeks. Continuing with a six-week tryout at the Deauville Hotel in Miami Beach, Florida, the idea continued to be a smash. Barnett and Russell were replaced midway through the run by Gary Clarke and Jerry Paul. When the show ended, Butala landed a job as singer/bass player in a lounge group, "Bill Norvis and the Upstarts", along with Clarke. After a few months, Clarke left the group and was replaced by Jim Pike (November 6, 1936 – June 9, 2019).

Pike and Butala decided to leave the Upstarts and form a new group, although they had not yet decided on a name. Pike envisioned a group where each member was an excellent soloist as well as a great group singer. Pike and Butala joined with Bob Engemann (February 19, 1935 – January 20, 2013), a singer whom Pike had met when he attended Brigham Young University a few years earlier. (Pike and Engemann had come to Los Angeles, California and sung together until Engemann had to go into the California National Guard for six months; Pike then joined Bill Norvis and there met Butala.) The combination of Pike, Engemann, and Butala first recorded in 1960. They secured a recording contract with Warner Bros. Records through Bob Engemann's older brother, Karl Engemann, who was a record producer there; Pike had earlier released a record for him, Lucy D, which was not successful.

As "The Lettermen", Pike, Butala, and Engemann released two singles in 1960 for Warner Bros. The A-sides were "Two Hearts" and "Their Hearts Were Full of Spring". They were not successful. After Warner Bros., Karl Engemann moved on to Capitol Records as President of A&R. He got them out of their contract at Warner Bros. and made an appointment for them to see Nick Venet, a producer at Capitol. The audition was successful in getting them another record contract.

There was another "Lettermen" group in the late 1950s and early 1960s that recorded for Liberty Records (which was a major record label at the time), a five-member R&B group, and their not-so-successful single was called "Hey Big Brain". About that same time, there was a third group called the Lettermen Trio, headed up by Sammy Vandenburg, who also had no record success. But the "Lettermen" of Pike, Engemann, and Butala had the first hit record, so, by law, they were entitled to use the "Lettermen" name exclusively. Butala recalled that he was not particularly fond of the name and would have chosen a different, more unique moniker in retrospect, but by the time the trio became hitmakers, it was too late to do much about it, and the fact that the name was by then passé now made the group stand out and played into their favor.

The Lettermen were unknown until they signed with Capitol Records in 1961. Their first single for Capitol, "The Way You Look Tonight", succeeded on the Billboard Hot 100 pop chart and climbed to No. 13. Their next, "When I Fall in Love," reached the Top 10 in late 1962 and hit No. 1 on AC. They had several other Top 10 AC hits, such as 1965's "Theme From A Summer Place". In late 1967, Bob Engemann resigned and was replaced by Jim Pike's younger brother, Gary Pike. The hits continued with the grammy-nominated 1968 medley "Goin' Out of My Head"/"Can't Take My Eyes Off You" and "Put Your Head on My Shoulder", plus 1969's "Hurt So Bad", which reached No. 12 and lasted 21 weeks on the Hot 100, second only to the 22 weeks for The Archies' "Sugar, Sugar" within that calendar year. Their 1962 single, "A Song For Young Love" earned them a grammy nomination, and they released their last successful single "Everything Is Good About You" in 1971.

The Lettermen have had two Top 10 singles (both No. 7), 16 Top 10 Adult Contemporary singles, including one Adult Contemporary No. 1, 32 consecutive Billboard Hot 200 charted albums, 11 gold records, four Grammy nominations, an Andy Award, and a Clio Award.

The Lettermen were featured on the TV show Dobie Gillis in the episode "Vocal Boy Makes Good" which originally aired on January 16, 1963. In the episode, they get furious at a fictionalized version of Bob Engermann who is "hammy" and continually interrupts sets to show off. Mid-performance, they stop singing to punch, beat, and slap each other's backsides with their guitars until they are all wrestling on the floor. Afterwards, to ensure the band does not break up, protagonist Dobie Gillis takes the singer's place.

The Lettermen were featured on The Jack Benny Program in the episode "The Lettermen" which originally aired on March 31, 1964. {S14 Ep25}

In 1961, The Lettermen started performing live concerts, doing over 200 shows a year, an unbroken string that continues to the present.

The shift toward harder rock and psychedelic music in the late 1960s largely ended the string of hit records the trio had accumulated. Butala indicated he was unwilling to shift in that direction, as he was largely as clean, conservative and morally upright as his group's reputation had them being. A steady string of television appearances kept the trio in the public spotlight during this period. In 1969, in light of The Doors' singer Jim Morrison's arrest in Miami for indecent exposure, the Lettermen performed at a concert against indecency, along with Anita Bryant, Kate Smith, and Jackie Gleason. President Nixon supported the concert.

In 1974, the group decided to drop the "the" in their name, as a way to appeal to younger audiences at the time, on their album "Now and Forever" and their single "Eastward". Jim Pike left the group in 1976 because of vocal problems and sold the Lettermen name to Butala. After Gary Pike left the Lettermen in 1981, the Pike brothers, along with Ric de Azevedo sang The Lettermen hits, billed as "Reunion".

Over the decades, the group has had various line-ups, replacing members who left for various reasons with new people to maintain a trio. Tony Butala has stated that the group ethos is that of three strong soloists that harmonize, and that the group encourages individual singing and songwriting. Butala has stated that the combination of himself, Donovan Tea (40 years) and Bobby Poynton (18 years) "is the best combination of voices, and best sounding group since the original trio." Butala also said this of the previous line-up of himself, Tea, and Mark Preston (11 years).

Among their many songs include renditions of several traditional Filipino kundimans such as Dahil sa Iyo ("Because of You"), Sapagkat Kami Ay Tao Lamang ("For We Are Only Human"). Their enunciation and pronunciation in the language has developed over the decades that they have interpreted these love songs.

Bob Engemann died at age 77 in Provo, Utah on January 20, 2013 of complications from his December 13, 2012 heart bypass surgery.

Jim Pike died from complications of Parkinson's disease on June 9, 2019, at his home in Prescott, Arizona. He was 82. Tony Butala, as the last surviving member of the group, retired from active performing since 2019, but still maintained a background presence with the group and occasionally made guest appearances, the last being in 2025. On November 1, 2026, it was announced that Butala had died. He was 87.

== Personnel ==
Current members

- Donovan Tea – baritone (1984–present)
- Bobby Poynton – first tenor (1990–1995, 2011–present)
- Rob Gulack – second tenor (2019–present)

Past members

- Tony Butala – second tenor (1959–2019, died 2026)
- Jim Pike – first tenor (1959–1969, 1970–1974, died 2019)
- Bob Engemann – baritone (1959–1967, died 2013)
- Gary Pike – baritone & first tenor (1967–1981)
- Doug Curran – first tenor (1969–1970, died 2016)
- Donny Pike – first tenor (1974–1981)
- Ralph "Chad" Nichols – baritone (1981–1983)
- Don Campeau – first tenor (1981–1984)
- David "Red" Saber – baritone (1983–1984)
- Harrison "Harry" Clewley – first tenor (1984)
- Mark Preston – first tenor (1984–1988, 2006–2011)
- Ernie Pontiere – first tenor (1988–1990)
- Paul Walters – baritone (1989–1990, temporary substitute for Tea)
- Darren Dowler – first tenor (1995–2005)

== Awards and recognition ==
- 2001: Inducted into the Vocal Group Hall of Fame
- 2011: Inducted into the "Fans' Entertainment Hall of Fame" - Las Vegas, NV
- 2012: Inducted into the Hit Parade Hall of Fame
- 2020: inducted into the Hollywood Walk of Fame

== Discography ==
=== Albums ===
Capitol Records, unless otherwise noted.

- 1962: A Song for Young Love (US No. 6)
- 1962: Once Upon a Time (No. 30)
- 1962: Jim, Tony and Bob (No. 59)
- 1963: College Standards (No. 65)
- 1963: In Concert (No. 76)
- 1964: A Lettermen Kind of Love (No. 31)
- 1964: Look at Love (No. 94)
- 1964: She Cried (No. 41)
- 1965: You'll Never Walk Alone (No. 73)
- 1965: Portrait of My Love (No. 27)
- 1965: The Hit Sounds of The Lettermen (No. 13)
- 1966: More Hit Sounds of The Lettermen (No. 57)
- 1966: A New Song for Young Love (No. 52)
- 1966: For Christmas This Year (re-released 1975 and again in 1990)(No. 41)
- 1967: Warm (No. 58)
- 1967: Spring! (No. 31)
- 1967: The Lettermen!! ...And Live! (No. 10)
- 1968: Goin' Out of My Head (No. 13)
- 1968: Special Request (No. 82)
- 1968: Put Your Head on My Shoulder (No. 43)
- 1969: Hurt So Bad (No. 17)
- 1969: I Have Dreamed (No. 74)
- 1970: Traces/Memories (No. 42)
- 1970: Reflections (No. 134)
- 1971: Everything's Good About You (No. 119)
- 1971: Feelings (No. 192)
- 1971: Love Book (No. 88)
- 1972: Lettermen 1 (No. 136)
- 1972: Live in Japan
- 1972: Spin Away
- 1972: A Time for Us
- 1973: Alive Again ...Naturally (No. 193)
- 1974: Now and Forever
- 1975: There Is No Greater Love
- 1975: Make a Time for Lovin
- 1975: The Time Is Right
- 1975: Lettermen Live in Japan, 1975
- 1976: Kind of Country
- 1977: To a Friend
- 1979: Love Is...
- 1979: Lettermen Live with New Japan Philharmonic (Eastworld)
- 1985: Evergreen
- 1986: Why I Love Her (Alpha Omega) (re-released 1993 and 2006)
- 1987: It Feels Like Christmas (Pilz) (re-released 1992 on CD & Cassette Tape and again as reissue version of the 1987 album on September 3, 2013 on CD {from MVD Records} and again in 2014 as CD {along with 4 bonus tracks} {from Capitol Records/EMI and MVD Records} under the RCA label}
- 1991: "Then & Now"
- 1991: Close to You
- 1991: Live in Concert
- 1991: The Lettermen... Then & Now
- 1992: "Best Hits"
- 1992: Sing We Noel
- 1993: Love Is All
- 1993: "At The Movies"
- 1995: Christmas with The Lettermen (Unison)
- 1995: Deck the Halls
- 1997: Today (Dominion)
- 2000: Greatest Movie Hits
- 2006: Live in the Philippines (EMI)
- 2006: Why I Love Her
- 2008: The Lettermen: Best of Broadway
- 2008: The Lettermen: Favorites
- 2010: The Lettermen: New Directions 2010
- 2014: The Lettermen: It Feels Like Christmas – Special Edition (Along with 4 bonus tracks) (An reissued version of the 1987 album)
- 2014: The Lettermen: It Feels Like Christmas – Deluxe Edition (Along with 6 bonus tracks) (Target Exclusive only) (An reissued of the 1987 album)
- 2014: The Lettermen: Christmas Classic Collection (13 Tracks including Christmas All Alone, It Feels Like Christmas, ‘’The Twelve Days of Christmas’’ and 10 more tracks)
- 2015: The Lettermen: The Classic Christmas Album (15 Tracks)
- 2018: The Lettermen: Golden Classic Christmas (16 Tracks) (re-released in Fall 2018 as CD from Capitol Records under the label RCA and MVD Records)

==== Compilations ====
- 1966: The Best of The Lettermen (re-released 1988 on CD/Capitol)(No. 17)
- 1969: The Best of The Lettermen, Volume 2
- 1969: Close Up (No. 90) (Released 7/16/1969)
- 1970: The Lettermen (3-LP set)
- 1971: Let It Be Me/And I Love Her
- 1973: Best Now (CD: Capitol/Japan)
- 1974: Sings Old Rock'n Roll
- 1974: All-Time Greatest Hits (No. 186)
- 1975: New Best 20
- 1975: The Lovin' Touch of The Lettermen
- 1977: With Love from The Lettermen
- 1987: Best 20
- 1988: Twin Best Now
- 1989: When I Fall in Love
- 1990: Best Now (CD: Capitol/Japan)
- 1990: Greatest Hits – 10 Best Series
- 1992: Collectors Series
- 1993: Best Hits
- 1993: 36 All-Time Greatest Hits
- 1994: Their Greatest Hits & Finest Performances
- 1997: Super Now
- 1998: Memories: The Very Best of The Lettermen
- 2002: A Song for Young Love/Once Once Upon a Time
- 2003: Soft Rock Collection
- 2003: Greatest Hits: The Priceless Collection
- 2003: The Lettermen Collection: Beautiful Harmony (6-CD set:Japan)
- 2004: Absolutely the Best
- 2006: Complete Hits
- 2007: Complete Hits Volume Two
- 2010: Lettermen Best
- 2014: The First Four Albums And More

=== Singles ===
| Year | Title | Peak chart positions | | | | |
| Year | Title | US BB | US CB | US AC | CAN (CHUM RPM) | CAN AC |
|---|---|---|---|---|---|---|
| 1961 | "The Way You Look Tonight" | 13 | 8 | 3 | 14 | — |
| 1961 | "When I Fall in Love" | 7 | 13 | 1 | — | — |
| 1962 | "Son of Old Rivers" | — | — | — | — | — |
| 1962 | "Come Back Silly Girl" | 17 | 19 | 3 | 12 | — |
| 1962 | "A Song For Young Love" | — | 123 | — | — | — |
| 1962 | "How Is Julie?" | 42 | 50 | 16 | — | — |
| 1962 | "Turn Around, Look at Me" | 105 | 85 | — | — | — |
| 1962 | "Silly Boy (She Doesn't Love You)" | 81 | 97 | — | — | — |
| 1962 | "Again" | 120 | 95 | — | — | — |
| 1963 | "Heartache Oh Heartache" | 122 | — | — | — | — |
| 1963 | "Allentown Jail" | 123 | — | — | — | — |
| 1963 | "Where or When" | 98 | — | — | — | — |
| 1964 | "Put Away Your Tear Drops" | 132 | 125 | — | — | — |
| 1964 | "You Don't Know Just How Lucky You Are" | — | — | — | — | — |
| 1965 | "Girl with a Little Tin Heart" | 135 | 112 | — | — | — |
| 1965 | "Theme from A Summer Place" | 16 | 17 | 2 | 21 | — |
| 1965 | "Secretly" | 64 | 56 | 8 | — | — |
| 1965 | "Sweet September" | 114 | 97 | 24 | — | 23 |
| 1966 | "You'll Be Needin' Me" | — | 118 | — | — | — |
| 1966 | "I Only Have Eyes for You" | 72 | 82 | 4 | 74 | — |
| 1966 | "Chanson D'Amour" | 112 | 117 | 8 | — | — |
| 1966 | "Our Winter Love" | 72 | 120 | 16 | 91 | — |
| 1967 | "Volare" | — | — | 17 | — | — |
| 1967 | "Somewhere My Love" | — | — | — | — | — |
| 1967 | "Goin' Out of My Head / Can't Take My Eyes Off You" | 7 | 7 | 2 | 8 | — |
| 1968 | "Sherry Don't Go" | 52 | 35 | 9 | 35 | — |
| 1968 | "All the Gray-Haired Men" | 109 | 116 | — | — | — |
| 1968 | "Holly" | — | — | — | — | — |
| 1968 | "Medley: Love Is Blue/Greensleeves" | — | — | — | — | — |
| 1968 | "Sally le Roy" | — | — | — | — | — |
| 1968 | "Put Your Head on My Shoulder" | 44 | 52 | 8 | 42 | — |
| 1969 | "I Have Dreamed" | 129 | — | 16 | — | 16 |
| 1969 | "Hurt So Bad" | 12 | 14 | 2 | 10 | 1 |
| 1969 | "Shangri-La" | 64 | 55 | 8 | 50 | 8 |
| 1969 | "Traces/Memories Medley" | 47 | 51 | 3 | 37 | 3 |
| 1970 | "Hang On Sloopy" | 93 | 101 | 18 | — | — |
| 1970 | "She Cried" | 73 | 54 | 6 | 55 | — |
| 1970 | "Hey Girl" | 104 | 111 | 17 | — | — |
| 1971 | "Morning Girl" | — | — | 34 | — | — |
| 1971 | "Everything Is Good About You" | 74 | 78 | 6 | 69 | 9 |
| 1971 | "The Greatest Discovery" | — | — | — | — | — |
| 1971 | "Feelings" | — | — | 33 | — | — |
| 1971 | "Love" | 42 | 44 | 8 | 43 | 19 |
| 1971 | "Oh My Love" | — | — | — | — | — |
| 1972 | "Spin Away" | — | — | — | — | — |
| 1973 | "Sandman" | — | — | — | 73 | 2 |
| 1973 | "A Summer Song" | — | — | 25 | 21 | 11 |
| 1974 | "The You Part of Me" | — | — | — | — | — |
| 1974 | "Touch Me in the Morning/The Way We Were" | — | — | 31 | — | 10 |
| 1975 | "Eastward" | — | — | 16 | — | 8 |
| 1975 | "You Are My Sunshine Girl" | — | — | 28 | — | 20 |
| 1976 | "If You Feel the Way I Do" | — | — | — | — | — |
| 1976 | "The Way You Look Tonight"^{1} | — | — | — | — | — |
| 1977 | "What I Did for Love" | — | — | — | — | — |
| 1979 | "World Fantasy" | — | — | — | — | — |
| 1980 | "In the Morning I'm Coming Home" | — | — | — | — | — |
| 1985 | "It Feels Like Christmas" | — | — | — | — | — |
| 1986 | "Proud Lady of America" | — | — | — | — | — |
| 1987 | "One More Summer Night" | — | — | — | — | — |
| 1988 | "All I Ask of You" | — | — | — | — | — |

Footnotes:
^{1} The 1976 release of "The Way You Look Tonight" was a new disco version.

== See also ==
- List of vocal groups
- Boy band
- Traditional pop
