= Storm Front (quartet) =

Barbershop quartet

- Genres: Barbershop
- Members: Jeff Selano – tenor Jim Clark – lead Darin Drown – baritone Syd Libsack – bass
- Past members: Dave Ellis – tenor

Storm Front is the barbershop quartet that won the International Quartet Championship for 2010 at the Barbershop Harmony Society's annual international convention in Philadelphia, Pennsylvania.

The quartet has applied a comedy format from 2007 onward, with many of their songs being parodies or medleys.

== Discography ==
- Storm Watch (CD)
- Storm Warning (CD)
- Harmony – A Beatles Tribute, Volume 1 (CD)
- Free as a Breeze (DVD)
- The Road to Gold (DVD/CD, 2010)
- Misfit Toys (CD, 2016)
- Scaramouche (CD; 2017)

Preceded by Crossroads	SPEBSQSA International Quartet Champions; 2010	Succeeded by Old School
