= Platinum (quartet) =

Barbershop quartet

- Genres: Barbershop
- Members: Gary Lewis – tenor Joe Connelly – lead Tony DeRosa – baritone Kevin Miles – bass

Platinum is a barbershop quartet, created in 1998 and the 2000 SPEBSQSA international quartet champions. They are famous for their long posts (held notes at the end of songs), particularly in their adaptation of the song Be Our Guest and in Clay Hine's arrangement of Auld Lang Syne, which is on Platinum's CD of the same name.

Connelly and DeRosa were also members of the 1992 international champion quartet Keepsake. Connelly won gold in 1987 with the quartet Interstate Rivals and again in 2011 with the quartet Old School. DeRosa and Lewis are the lead and baritone of the 2007 Champions, MaxQ. Kevin Miles has been a member of The Dapper Dans and has served as the Voice of Epcot Center, both at Walt Disney World.

Platinum was notable for scoring the most points for a single quartet's song in the history of the contest with their rendition of Cuddle Up A Little Closer, Lovey Mine, in which they scored 1438 points out of a possible 1500.

Preceded by FRED	SPEBSQSA International Quartet Champions; 2000	Succeeded by Michigan Jake
