= Till (song) =

1957 song by Charles Danvers and Carl Sigman

Single by Roger Williams

from the album Till
- B-side: "Big Town"
- Released: October 1957
- Genre: Traditional pop
- Length: 2:55
- Label: Kapp
- Songwriter(s): Charles Danvers, Carl Sigman
- Producer(s): Martin Gold

Roger Williams singles chronology
| "Moonlight Love" (1957) | "Till" (1957) | "Arrivederci, Roma" (1958) |

"'Til"

Single by The Angels
- B-side: "A Moment Ago"
- Released: October 1961
- Recorded: 1961
- Genre: Pop
- Length: 2:20
- Label: Caprice
- Songwriter(s): Charles Danvers, Carl Sigman
- Producer(s): Dick Glasser

The Angels singles chronology
| "'Til" (1961) | "Cry Baby Cry" (1962) |

"Till"

Single by The Vogues

from the album Till
- B-side: "I Will"
- Released: November 1968
- Genre: Pop
- Length: 2:17
- Label: Reprise
- Songwriter(s): Charles Danvers, Carl Sigman
- Producer(s): Dick Glasser

The Vogues singles chronology
| "My Special Angel" (1968) | "Till" (1968) | "Woman Helping Man" (1969) |

"Till" is a popular song with music by Charles Danvers and English lyrics by Carl Sigman. In 1956, French Algerian composer Charles Danvers (1910–1986) was heard performing the song in a Parisian cabaret by two Americans. It was released in the U.S. in January 1957 by Percy Faith. It was derived from the French song "Prière Sans Espoir", released in 1956 by Lucien Lupi on the EP L'Amour Viendra with original French lyrics written by Pierre Benoit Buisson. Italian singer Caterina Valente released a version in 1960 with lyrics by Gaiano. In 1965, Danvers immigrated to East Islip, New York, where he continued writing music, which was performed by singers such as Jerry Vale, Tony Bennett, and Dinah Shore.

== Notable cover versions ==
- Percy Faith — number 63 on the Billboard charts (1957)
- Roger Williams — number 22 on the Billboard charts (1957), and gold record
- Gina Lollobrigida (1958)
- Shirley Bassey — number 14 on the UK Singles Chart from the album Shirley Bassey (1961)
- Tony Bennett — number 35 on the UK Singles Chart (1961)
- The Angels — number 14 on the Billboard charts as "'Til" (1961)
- The Vogues — number 27 on the Billboard charts (1968) from the album Till (1969)
- Dorothy Squires — number 25 on the UK Singles Chart (1970)
- Tom Jones — number 2 on the UK Singles Chart, number 41 on the Billboard charts (1971)
