= Marquis (quartet) =

Barbershop quartet

- Marquis

Background information
- Genres: Barbershop
- Years active: 1993–2001
- Members: Dale Fetick – tenor Randy Chisholm – lead Paul Gilman – baritone Jay Hawkins – bass

Marquis is a barbershop quartet that won the 1995 SPEBSQSA international competition. Originating from the Cincinnati-Dayton area, they won the championship less than two years after they formed.

Their lead singer, Randy Chisholm, was the first Canadian-born singer in a champion SPEBSQSA quartet. The singing tenor was Dale Fetick, while both bass Jay Hawkins and baritone Paul Gilman had sung previously in 1987 champion quartet Interstate Rivals. They appeared in two 1996 PBS special productions "Voices In Harmony" and the Cincinnati Pops Orchestra Halloween concert. They produced two compact discs: Diamond Cuts and In The Wee Small Hours.

The quartet suffered a loss with the death of Randy in 1997. Although they recruited Denny Gore as the lead to fulfill remaining commitments, they disbanded after a few years.

== Discography ==
- In The Wee Small Hours (CD)
- Diamond Cuts (CD)

Preceded by Joker's Wild	SPEBSQSA International Quartet Champions; 1995	Succeeded by Nightlife
