= The Vogues =

American vocal group

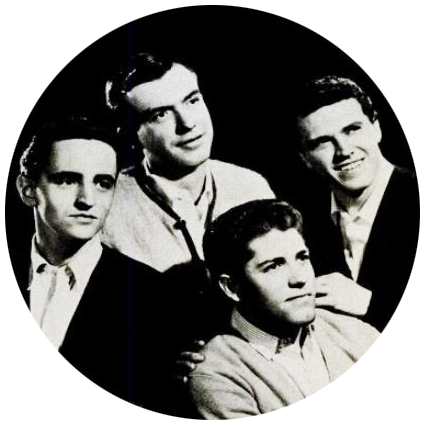
- The Vogues in 1965. Clockwise from left: Hugh Geyer, Bill Burkette, Chuck Blasko, Don Miller

Background information
- Origin: Turtle Creek, Pennsylvania, U.S.
- Genres: Rock and roll, pop, blue-eyed soul
- Years active: 1958–present
- Labels: Co & Ce, Reprise
- Members: Royce Taylor; Troy Elich; Elliott McCoy; Sean Moran
- Past members: Chuck Blasko; Bill Burkette; Don Miller; Hugh Geyer See rest at Members

The Vogues are an American pop/rock and roll group from Turtle Creek, Pennsylvania, a suburb of Pittsburgh. The original lineup consisted of Bill Burkette (September 17, 1942 – March 1, 2018, lead baritone), Don Miller (1940 – January 11, 2021, baritone), Hugh Geyer (born May 1941, first tenor), and Chuck Blasko (born 1943, second tenor).

They are best known for their chart-topping singles "You're the One", "Five O'Clock World", "Magic Town", "My Special Angel" and "Turn Around, Look at Me". In addition to touring the world, the group appeared on American Bandstand, The Tonight Show, and The Ed Sullivan Show. They were inducted into the Vocal Group Hall of Fame in 2001.

== Career ==
=== 1958–1969 ===
The group, originally named the Val-Airs, formed in 1958 at Turtle Creek High School, with members including Bill Burkette, Hugh Geyer, Don Miller, and Chuck Blasko. In 1961, Geyer and Miller enlisted in the Military, and after discharging in 1964, reformed The Val-Airs with Blasko and Burkette.

They signed with Pittsburgh manager Elmer Willet, who produced their first recording release "Which One Will It Be/Launie My Love". DJ Porky Chedwick became a supporter booking the group for his rock and roll shows and record hops. Chedwick put them on bills with the Drifters, the Platters, and the Dells. Clark Race of KDKA radio promoted the group on his KDKA-TV dance show. Having strong regional sales, the single was picked up for national distribution by Coral Records.

Each member paid $100 towards the fee to record a demo tape. They hired Nick Cenci, who had helped bring Lou Christie mainstream success, to produce the recording. In 1965, Cenci produced recording sessions for the Val-Aires at Gateway Studios in Pittsburgh, including vocals for a cover of the Petula Clark song "You're the One", which was released on the band's own Blue Star label. Cenci then persuaded John Rook, program director of KQV, to play the single. With local airplay and sales Cenci signed them to the Co & Ce label as the "Vogues" and secured national distribution. The song soon became a national hit reaching number four on the Billboard Hot 100.

According to Geyer, the group were unaware of the name change to The Vogues. As the group members were all still working full-time jobs, Geyer came home from work one day to his wife telling him that "You're the One" had just been on the radio and that "they're calling you The Vogues". It is believed that the name came from Willet's old supper club, The Vogue Terrace, that he had owned just outside of Pittsburgh in the 1950s.

Later in 1965, Cenci produced another Vogues recording session, which resulted in a No. 4 Billboard hit, "Five O'Clock World". In 1966, Co & Ce Records released the singles "Magic Town", which reached no. 21 in April of that year, and the no. 29 "The Land of Milk and Honey". The singles "Summer Afternoon" and "Lovers of the World Unite" were released on Co & Ce in 1967. Co & Ce leased the Vogues to Reprise Records (distributed by Warner Bros.) where they found success with cover versions of "Turn Around, Look at Me" (No. 7), "My Special Angel" (No. 7), "Till" (No. 27), "No, Not Much" (No. 34), "Earth Angel (Will You Be Mine)" (No. 42), "Moments to Remember" (No. 47), and "Green Fields" (No. 92). Dick Glasser also produced several unreleased singles by The Vogues for Reprise, including Paul Levinson's "Unbelievable (Inconceivable) You". The original group appeared on popular TV shows in the 1960s, including The Tonight Show, The Ed Sullivan Show, Shindig, The Red Skelton Show, The Glen Campbell Goodtime Hour, American Bandstand, Hullabaloo, and The Mike Douglas Show.

=== 1970s–1983 ===
In 1971, the Vogues signed a recording contract with Bell Records and recorded three singles ("Love Song", "Take Time to Tell Her", and "American Family"). In 1972, the group released one single on Mainstream Records ("Need You" b/w "Greatest Show on Earth"). By 1973, Geyer had left the group. Now recording for 20th Century Records, the group released three singles ("My Prayer", "Wonderful Summer", and "Prisoner of Love"), which were commercially unsuccessful and represented the last singles released by The Vogues.

Miller left the group in 1974 and was replaced by a succession of other vocalists. By the 1980s, the group had stopped touring and were concentrating on Western Pennsylvania venues. Burkette left the group in 1983, leaving Chuck Blasko as the only original member of The Vogues. Vocalist Gary Racan joined Chuck Blasko & The Vogues and performed with them for 16 years, departing to start his own band. In 2022 Racan filled in several shows with the Troy Elich led Vogues. During one show Racan was reunited with Bo Wagner, his former bandmate from Chuck Blasko's Vogues.

=== "The Vogues" trademark ===
At some point during the late 1970s or early 1980s, the group's manager trademarked the name and assets of the Vogues. He later sold the trademark to Bengar Inc (Pete Garofalo), who starting booking other quartets as the Vogues. Pete Garofalo was a baritone who was with The Vogues from 1973 through the early 1990s. While owner of the trademark, he performed with them as well as having a group touring on the road. Pete Garofalo died in 1997, which led to the sale of the trademark. The trademark was sold several times, resulting in a variety of unrelated groups of singers claiming to be the Vogues. In 2000, the trademark was purchased by vocalist and Pittsburgh area native Stan Elich. During these years Blasko continued to perform as the Vogues, clashed with the "trademark" group, and eventually testified in front of Congress on the Truth in Music Act. A lawsuit filed by Blasko ended with the Pennsylvania court permitting Blasko's Vogues to perform in 14 Western Pennsylvania counties and the "trademark" group to perform everywhere else in the world as The Vogues.

=== Recent history ===
The original group was inducted into the Vocal Group Hall of Fame in 2001.

From 2004 until 2006, Geyer joined Blasko's Vogues in the 14 Western Pennsylvania counties that Blasko's group was permitted to tour in. After creative differences with Blasko, Geyer left Blasko's group at the end of 2006. In March 2007, Geyer joined the nationally touring "trademark" group of The Vogues of trademark owner Elich. Geyer continued to perform with this group until his retirement in December 2012. Upon his retirement he was replaced by Royce Taylor, who had previously been a member of The Vogues from 1991 to 1997. In May 2008, original lead vocalist Bill Burkette also joined Geyer in touring the US with the "trademark" Vogues. The members of this group included Burkette, Geyer, Elich, Elich's son Troy, and Jim Campagna. Stan Elich died in December 2010. Troy Elich now owns the trademark "The Vogues".

In 2010, the Stan Elich-owned Vogues released a live album, The Vogues Sings the Hits Live, on the Desert Trax Music label. This marked the first time in 38 years that Burkette and Geyer recorded together.

Bill Burkette (born William W. Burkette III on September 17, 1942) died of lymphoma on March 1, 2018, at the age of 75.

After Bill Burkette's death in March, 2018, he was replaced by Bo Wagner, who had been filling in during Burkette's illness. Wagner had been a member of Blasko's Vogues from 1983 to 1997. Wagner left the Vogues in 2023 due to health issues. Bo (Robert H. Bogesdorfer) Wagner died on July 13, 2024 at the age of 78. Tennessee native Elliott McCoy replaced Wagner in 2023.

The Vogues' lineup as of March, 2024 are Troy Elich, Royce Taylor, and Elliott McCoy.

In 2020 it was announced that The Vogues would for the first time be a part of The Turtles "Happy Together Tour". But due to the COVID-19 pandemic most of the tour was cancelled. The Vogues were again scheduled to be in the tour in 2021, but like 2020, many dates were cancelled due to COVID-19. When 2022 rolled around The Vogues were ready to go head on in the Happy Together Tour. Bo Wagner made the decision to sit out the rigorous tour. He was replaced on tour by Shawn Stevens, who at one time had performed as a member of The Diamonds. The Vogues were once again a part of the Happy Together Tour in 2023, with Shawn Stevens filling in again for Bo Wagner. The Vogues were again part of the Happy Together tour in 2024, with the line up of Elich, Taylor and Sean Moran (another former member of Blasko's Pittsburgh group) filling for McCoy. In 2025, for the fifth year in a row, The Vogues (Troy Elich, Royce Taylor and Sean Moran) appeared on the "Happy Together Tour" with The Turtles, The Cowsills, Mark Lindsay, Jay & The Americans, and Little Anthony and The Imperials.

Don Miller died on January 11, 2021, of COVID-19, at age 80.

In 2022, The Vogues released the album Still Tickin', featuring all new recordings of their top ten favorite hits.

== Members ==
Current members

- Royce Taylor – lead first tenor (1991–1997, 2012-present)
- Troy Elich – lead baritone (2000–present)
- Elliott McCoy – baritone (2023–present)
- Sean Moran – baritone (2024-present)

Current backing band members

- Tom Lamb – guitar (2000-2015, 2023-present)
- Art DeLeonardis – drums (2002-present)
- J.R. Wright – keyboard (2014-present)
- Paul Page – bass (2021-present)

Former members

- Bill Burkette – lead baritone (1965–1983, 2008–2018; died 2018)
- Hugh Geyer – first tenor (1965–1973, 2007–2012)
- Chuck Blasko – second tenor (1965–1986)
- Don Miller – baritone (1965–1974; died 2021)
- Pete Garofalo – baritone (1974-1983)
- Bo Wagner – lead baritone (1983-1986, 2017-2024)
- Gary Racan – first tenor (1983-1986)
- Gino Biscotti – lead baritone (1986)
- Allen Simms – first tenor (1986)
- Terry Brightbill – lead baritone (1986-2000)
- Gary Shaeffer – first tenor (1986-1988)
- Jeff Knabb – baritone vocals (1990-1994)
- Amy Banister – background vocals (1987-1988)
- Armand DeMille - lead first tenor (1988-1991, 2013-2014)
- Stan Elich - lead baritone, second tenor (1989-2010)
- Jim Campagna - lead first tenor (1997 - 2010)
- John Bigler – lead second tenor (2010-2012)
- Shawn Stevens - baritone (2022-2023)

Former backing band members

The Vogues only started using their own personal backing band in 1986. In the 1960s and 1970s, the band mostly relied on members of the nearest Musicians Union in whatever state they were in, as well as some members bringing their own guitars; however, the group had their own personal drummer, Gene Molinaro (April 24, 1940 – September 19, 2009).

- Beth Brightbill – drums (1986-2000)
- Keith DiPiazza – keyboards (1986-1987, 1990-1991)
- Mike Vigilante – bass guitar (1986-1987)
- Terry Brightbill – lead guitar (1986-2000)
- Charmaine Woods – keyboards (1987-1988)
- Gary Shaeffer – bass guitar (1992-1997)
- Jeff Knabb – bass guitar (1987-1989), keyboards (1991-1994)
- Ed Wilson - keyboards (1988-1990)
- Richard Kolb - bass guitar (1989-1990)
- Jay Van Sciock - bass guitar (1990-1992)
- Dan Brady - keyboards (1997 - 1999)
- Bob Shawgo - bass guitar (1997 - 1999)
- Joe Gribus - keyboards (1999 - 2004)
- Bruce Shwartz - bass guitar (1999 - 2000)
- Dave Riccadonna – drums (2000-2002)
- Emiliano Decena – bass guitar (2000-2008)
- Dave Watkins – keyboards (2004-2008)
- Rich Gooch – bass guitar (2008-2020)
- Dean Mastrangelo – keyboards (2008-2014), lead guitar (2017-2021)
- John Bigler – keyboards (2010-2012)
- Albert Pavlik – lead guitar (2015-2017)

== Studio albums ==
- Meet the Vogues (1965)
- Five O'Clock World (1966)
- Turn Around, Look at Me (1968) (No. 29 Billboard 200)
- Till (1969) (No. 30 Billboard 200)
- Memories (1969)
- The Vogues' Greatest Hits (1970)
- The Vogues Sing the Good Old Songs (1970)

== Singles ==
Year	A-side	B-side From same album as A-side except where indicated	Record Catalog Number	Notes	US	US AC	CAN	AUS	Album
1959	"Launie, My Love"	"Which One Will It Be?"	Willett 114	as the Valaires	-	-	-	-	Non-album tracks
1960	"Launie, My Love"	"Which One Will It Be"	Coral 62177	Re-release, as the Val-aires	-	-	-	-	Non-album tracks
1965	"You're the One"	"Some Words" (Non-album track)	Blue Star B-229	-	-	-	-	-	Meet The Vogues
1965	"You're the One"	"Some Words" (Non-album track)	Co & Ce 229	Re-release	4	-	16	55	Meet The Vogues
1965	"Five O'Clock World"	"Nothing to Offer You" (from Meet The Vogues)	Co & Ce 232	-	4	-	1	64	Five O'Clock World
1966	"Magic Town"	"Humpty Dumpty" (from Five O'Clock World)	Co & Ce 234	-	21	-	1	-	The Vogues' Greatest Hits
1966	"The Land of Milk and Honey"	"True Lovers"	Co & Ce 238	-	29	-	4	-	Non-album tracks
1966	"Please Mr. Sun"	"Don't Blame the Rain"	Co & Ce 240	-	48	-	39	-	Non-album tracks
1966	"That's the Tune"	"Midnight Dreams"	Co & Ce 242	-	99	-	-	-	Non-album tracks
1967	"Summer Afternoon"	"Take A Chance on Me Baby"	Co & Ce 244	-	-	-	-	-	Non-album tracks
1967	"Lovers of the World Unite"	"Brighter Days"	Co & Ce 246	-	-	-	-	-	Non-album tracks
1967	"Lovers of the World Unite"	"Brighter Days"	MGM 13813	Leased by MGM	-	-	-	-	Non-album tracks
1968	"Just What I've Been Lookin' For	"I've Got You On My Mind" (Non-album track)	Reprise 0663	-	-	-	-	-	The Vogues Sing The Good Old Songs and Other Hits
1968	"Turn Around, Look at Me"	"Then"	Reprise 0686	-	7	3	5	43	Turn Around, Look At Me
1968	"My Special Angel"	"I Keep It Hid"	Reprise 0766	-	7	1	6	36	Turn Around, Look At Me
1968	"Till"	"I Will"	Reprise 0788	-	27	5	17	-	Till
1969	"Woman Helping Man"	"I'll Know My Love (By The Way She Talks)"	Reprise 0803	-	-	-	-	-	Till
1969	"Woman Helping Man"	"No, Not Much"	Reprise 0803	Re-release	47/34	6/6	29/45	-	Till
1969	"Earth Angel (Will You Be Mine)"	"P.S. I Love You"	Reprise 0820	-	42	7	12	-	Memories
1969	"Moments to Remember"	"Once in a While"	Reprise 0831	-	47	17	29	97	Memories
1969	"Green Fields"	"Easy to Say" (From The Vogues Sing The Good Old Songs and Other Hits)	Reprise 0844	-	92	19	-	-	The Vogues' Greatest Hits
1969	"See That Girl"	"We Only Have Love" (Non-album track)	Reprise 0856	-	-	13	76	-	The Vogues' Greatest Hits
1970	"God Only Knows"	"Moody"	Reprise 0887	-	101	21	-	-	The Vogues Sing The Good Old Songs and Other Hits
1970	"Hey, That's No Way to Say Goodbye"	"Over the Rainbow" (Non-album track)	Reprise 0909	-	101	18	-	-	The Vogues Sing The Good Old Songs and Other Hits
1970	"Theme (The Good Old Songs)"	"Come Into My Arms" (From Turn Around, Look At Me)	Reprise 0931	-	-	27	-	-	The Vogues Sing The Good Old Songs and Other Hits
1970	"Since I Don't Have You"	"I Know You as a Woman"	Reprise 0969	-	-	8	-	-	The Vogues Sing The Good Old Songs and Other Hits
1971	"Love Song"	"We're on Our Way"	Bell 991X	-	118	23	-	-	Non-album tracks
1971	"Take Time to Tell Her"	"I'll Be with You"	Bell 45,127	-	-	38	-	-	Non-album tracks
1971	"An American Family"	"Gotta Have You Back"	Bell 45,158	-	-	-	-	-	Non-album tracks
1973	"My Prayer"	"I've Got to Learn to Live Without You"	20th Century 2041	-	-	31	-	-	Non-album tracks
1973	"Wonderful Summer"	"Guess Who"	20th Century 2060	-	-	47	-	-	Non-album tracks
1974	"As Time Goes By"	"Prisoner of Love"	20th Century 2085	-	-	-/37	-	-	Non-album tracks
