= I Have Dreamed (The Lettermen album) =

Studio album by The Lettermen
- Released: 1969
- Genre: Traditional pop
- Length: 31:47
- Label: Capitol

The Lettermen chronology
| Hurt So Bad (1969) | I Have Dreamed (1969) | Reflections (1970) |

I Have Dreamed is an album recorded by the Lettermen.

== Track listing ==
1. "I Have Dreamed" (Richard Rodgers, Oscar Hammerstein II)
2. "Traces" (Buddy Buie, James Cobb, Emory Gordy)
3. "Me About You" (Garry Bonner, Alan Gordon)
4. "I Love How You Love Me" (Barry Mann, Larry Kolber)
5. "California Dreamin'" (John Phillips, Michelle Phillips)
6. "I'm Gonna Make You Love Me" (Kenny Gamble, Jerry Ross, Jerry Williams, Jr.)
7. "You Showed Me" (Roger McGuinn, Gene Clark)
8. "Wichita Lineman" (Jimmy Webb)
9. "The Worst That Could Happen" (Webb)
10. "No Other Love" (Bob Russell, Paul Weston)
11. "T.K.E. Sweetheart Song (Of All The Girls That I Have Known)" (Albert M. Rockwell)
