= Vocal Group Hall of Fame =

American music organization, museum

Vocal Group Hall of Fame Foundation
- Established: 1998; 28 years ago until 2008
- Location: Columbia Theatre, 82 West State Street, Sharon, Pennsylvania, US
- Type: Vocal groups
- Founder: Bob Crosby
- President: Tony Butala
- Website: vocalgroup.org

The Vocal Group Hall of Fame & Museum Company Inc. was an American-based hall of fame that honored vocal groups throughout the United States. James E. Winner Jr. was the financial and managing partner of the For-profit corporation. Winner and Anthony F. Butala were the corporate officers/stockholders of The Museum Company. They set up an office located at Winner's business address on State Street in Sharon, Pennsylvania.

Control of the hall of fame has changed over the years. It went into hiatus and was closed in 2008.

== History ==
=== Founding ===
The Vocal Group Hall of Fame was conceived by Butala. He came up with the idea of the museum/hall of fame. Winner, a successful local businessman and entrepreneur, agreed to fund and operate the project. Butala is also a founding member of The Lettermen.

"The Vocal Group Hall of Fame & Museum Company Inc." opened in 1998 followed by The Vocal Group Hall of Fame 501 (c)3 Non-Profit Foundation. The foundation was formed and operated by attorneys and accountants employed by Winner.

The foundation was created to care for, protect and display the Inductees' memorabilia and to enjoy the benefits of a non-profit foundation. The foundation began collecting donations of memorabilia from the inductees and began seeking grants from the city of Sharon and the Commonwealth of Pennsylvania. It also solicited donations from a hopeful supportive public.

Shortly after the foundation was created, Winner renovated the Museum building. He later opened the Museum and set up headquarters at the newly renovated museum building that he owned across the street from his offices in Sharon.

=== 2001 ===
Inductions were scheduled and promoted for September 11, 2001 (9/11). The Vocal Group Hall of Fame Inductions and were to be produced behind the museum building in a parking lot. The Vocal Group Hall of Fame Museum Company Inc. had begun the 2001 Inductions preparation, production, and promotion when the 9/11 terror attack crisis left artists/inductees unable to travel to Inductions. All airplanes had been grounded, causing the 2001 inductions to be postponed to October 4, 2001.

In the time between 9/11 and October 4, 2001, a few members of the Vocal Group Hall of Fame museum staff went to a concert to see Kool & the Gang and the Village People. They liked the production and show management. The group made an offer to the concert promoter, Bob Crosby, who started with Dick Clark Productions in 1976. He was contracted to produce the 2001 Vocal Group Hall of Fame Production. Crosby successfully staged the event. He recorded video and audio of the 2001 inductions and marketed and packaged the first DVD.

Low museum attendance and unsatisfying ticket sales to the inductions created tension between Winner and Butala, who was busy with The Lettermen. This led to the dissolution of the for-profit Vocal Group Hall of Fame and Museum Company Inc.

Butala suggested to Winner that Crosby take over the Vocal Group Hall of Fame Foundation and rent the museum building from Winner. Butala and Winner closed the Vocal Group Museum Company Inc. and Crosby took over operations of The Vocal Group Hall of Fame Foundation as President and CEO.

Soon after Crosby took over the operation and administration of the foundation, Winner's attorneys and accountants, the board of directors of the foundation, resigned.

After Crosby was appointed President and CEO, the rental price, $1 per year plus utilities and maintenance, to change. However, the rent increased to $12,000 per month. Other bills and debts became the foundation's responsibility. Winner demanded that all renovation bills be charged to the foundation. This ended any chance for the foundation to survive with debt said to be over $1million. A final settlement was accepted after lawsuits were filed.

As differences grew, it became clear to the Vocal Group Hall of Fame Foundation that it could no longer afford to rent or occupy Winner's building. The Foundation could not provide for the museum and pay past bills. It was left with no alternative but to find a new location.

=== 2002 ===
On June 14, 2002, The Foundation purchased the 1750-seat Columbia Theatre, an early Warner Brothers theater, in Sharon. They moved all the foundation's memorabilia to storage. The Foundation office relocated to the Columbia Theatre.

== Inductions ==
The Vocal Group Hall of Fame Foundation typically inducted sixteen Vocal Groups annually. Artists were inducted within categories. Each category had an original group member, evolved group member or a family member as an inductee representative. These categories included 1940s, 1950s, 1960s, 1970s, 1980s and duos. The Vocal Group Hall of Fame Foundation released a public ballot that allowed anyone to vote for both the nominees and the inductees.

== Categories ==
While only vocal groups were eligible, other categories such as duos and lead vocalists with a harmony group were inducted if they had a legitimate backup harmony group with backing harmony singers, such as Tom Petty and the Heartbreakers.

== Closure ==
The Vocal Group Hall of Fame public operations, including the theater and museum, closed in 2008. It continues its mission to establish and operate a museum attraction where inductees meet and perform in support of the foundation.

== Columbia Theatre ==
Twenty-five years after it was purchased, the Foundation has not opened the attraction or received adequate funding. Part of a new roof was installed and the plastering of the dome was completed to make a watertight shell. The Mercer County Correctional Facility and volunteers removed more than 100 tons of debris to help make the theater ready for renovation.

The Columbia Theatre was meant to serve both as The Vocal Group Hall of Fame Foundation's central office and as the location for the annual induction ceremony. It was also to host benefit shows to support the foundation and theatre. The museum was to move to a three-story building purchased by the foundation, adjacent to the theater. It was to be a themed museum, nightclub, and piano bar.

== Truth in Music Bill ==
The Truth in Music bill was created to protect artists from identity theft. Jon Bauman, chairman of The Truth In Music Committee, Mary Wilson, and Bob Crosby at the foundation office, assisted in an effort to protect artists from fraud and abuse. Wilson championed the Truth in Music bill for many years throughout the United States and supported The Vocal Group Hall of Fame Foundation as Chair of the Artist Advisory Board until her death. The Truth In Music Bill helps ensure that people who perform in a group using a group's name have legal rights to use the name. The main beneficiaries are surviving members of the Platters, Coasters, Drifters and Marvelettes.

== Inductees ==
1998

- The Ames Brothers
- The Andrews Sisters
- The Beach Boys
- The Boswell Sisters
- Crosby, Stills & Nash
- Clyde McPhatter & The (Original) Drifters
- The Five Blind Boys of Mississippi
- The Golden Gate Quartet
- The Manhattan Transfer
- The Mills Brothers
- The Platters
- The Ravens
- Sonny Til & The Orioles
- The Supremes

1999

- The Coasters
- The Delta Rhythm Boys
- The Four Seasons
- The Four Tops
- Hank Ballard & The Midnighters
- The Ink Spots
- The Jackson Five
- Little Anthony & The Imperials
- The Modernaires
- The Moonglows
- Peter, Paul and Mary
- The Revelers
- The Spinners
- The Temptations

2000

- The Bangles
- Ben E. King and The Drifters
- Dion and The Belmonts
- Dixie Hummingbirds
- The Flamingos
- Frankie Lymon & The Teenagers
- The Kingston Trio
- The Mamas & The Papas
- The Skylarks
- The Soul Stirrers
- Three Dog Night

2001

- Bee Gees
- The Chordettes
- Eagles
- The Four Aces
- The Four Freshmen
- Gladys Knight and The Pips
- The Lennon Sisters
- The Lettermen
- The McGuire Sisters
- Michigan Jake
- The Oak Ridge Boys
- The Pied Pipers
- Smokey Robinson and The Miracles
- The Vogues
- The Weavers

2002

- ABBA
- The Chantels
- The Clovers
- The 5th Dimension
- The Five Keys
- The Four Knights
- The Harptones
- Jay and The Americans
- The Marcels
- The Shirelles
- The Skyliners
- The Swan Silvertones

2003

- The Association
- The Charioteers
- The Commodores
- Danny & The Juniors
- Earth, Wind & Fire
- The Five Satins
- The Four Lads
- The Impressions
- The Isley Brothers
- Martha & The Vandellas
- The Merry Macs
- Peerless Quartet
- The Whispers

2004

- Alabama
- American Quartet
- The Beatles
- The Cadillacs
- The Crests
- The Dells
- The Diamonds
- The Doobie Brothers
- The Everly Brothers
- The Four Tunes
- The Jordanaires
- The Marvelettes
- The O'Jays
- The Penguins
- The Ronettes
- The Stylistics
- The Tokens

2005

- The Angels
- The Brooklyn Bridge
- The Chi-Lites
- The Chiffons
- The Crystals
- The Del-Vikings
- The Hilltoppers
- The Mel-Tones
- The Neville Brothers
- The Pointer Sisters
- The Rascals
- The Righteous Brothers
- Sons of the Pioneers
- The Spaniels
- The Tymes

2006

- America
- Billy Ward & The Dominoes
- Bread
- The Byrds
- Deep River Boys
- The Duprees
- The Fleetwoods
- Haydn Quartet
- The Hi-Lo's
- The Hollies
- Journey
- The Lovin' Spoonful
- The Moody Blues
- Queen
- The Shangri-Las
- Simon & Garfunkel

2007

- The Capris (1960s)
- The Chords (1950s)
- The Dixie Cups (1960s)
- The Five Red Caps (1940s)
- The Four Preps (1950s)
- Maurice Williams and the Zodiacs; The Gladiolas (1950s)
- Harold Melvin & The Blue Notes (1970s)
- The Hoboken Four (Pioneer Award)
- The Jive Five (1960s)
- Kool & The Gang (1970s)
- The Monkees (1960s)
- Ruby & The Romantics (1960s)
- Sam & Dave (Duo Award)
- Sly & The Family Stone (1960s)
- Tony Orlando and Dawn (1970s)
- The Traveling Wilburys (1980s)

== See also ==
- List of music museums
- List of vocal groups
