= Four Voices =

Barbershop quartet

- Origin: Tennessee
- Genres: Barbershop
- Members: Lester Rector – tenor Chad Guyton – lead Brandon Guyton – baritone Dr. Jayson VanHook – bass
- Website: fourvoicesquartet.com

Four Voices is a barbershop quartet based in Tennessee. After winning the SPEBSQSA Collegiate Barbershop Quartet Championship in 1996, Four Voices went on to become international champions in 2002.

The quartet's sound is distinguished by its tenor's remarkable range (up to an E♭5 in chest voice), though all the singers (save the bass) have a remarkable tenor range and often end songs with the baritone or lead singing a higher note than the tenor.

The four members met each other when they attended Lee University together. They were all members of the Voices of Lee, sixteen-member a cappella choir. The members of Four Voices have stated that their name is meant to be a reference to their former membership in the choir.

== Discography ==
- 4 Voices (CD; 1999)
- Four Voices II (CD; 2003)
- Four Voices III (CD; 2013)

Preceded by Michigan Jake	SPEBSQSA International Quartet Champions; 2002	Succeeded by Power Play
