= Old School (quartet) =

Barbershop quartet

- Genres: Barbershop
- Members: Kipp Buckner – tenor Joe Connelly – lead Jack Pinto – baritone Joe Krones – bass

Old School is the barbershop quartet that won the International Quartet Championship for 2011 at the Barbershop Harmony Society's annual international convention, in Kansas City, Missouri. The quartet had earned silver medals the two years before, losing to Crossroads and Storm Front respectively, before winning gold medals in front of future champions Musical Island Boys, Masterpiece, Main Street, Forefront, and After Hours.

Preceded by Storm Front	SPEBSQSA International Quartet Champions; 2011	Succeeded by Ringmasters
