= Big Orange Chorus =

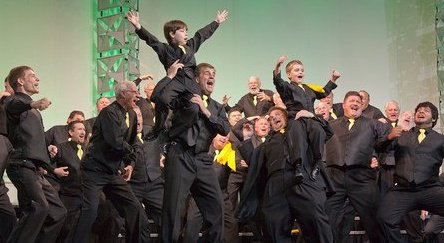
- Big Orange performing at 2011 Barbershop Harmony Society's International competition

Background information
- Origin: Jacksonville, Florida
- Genres: Barbershop music
- Years active: 1980–present
- Website: Official Website; Facebook; Twitter

The Big Orange Chorus is a men's chorus and chapter of the Barbershop Harmony Society based in Jacksonville, Florida. The chorus became a chartered member of the Sunshine District in Orange Park, a suburb of Jacksonville in 1980, and also attributes its name to this community. The primary musical focus of the chorus is a cappella music in the style of barbershop harmony, however their repertoire of music spans many styles and difficulty levels in addition to traditional barbershop. Over the years the membership of the chorus has grown to include men from all over the Jacksonville metropolitan area and beyond in the tri-state area of Florida, Georgia, and South Carolina.

The chorus has become a frequent competitor on the world stage. Most recently, The Big Orange Chorus was ranked 15th in the world at the Barbershop Harmony Society's International Competition in July 2018, at the Orange County Convention Center in Orlando, Florida. The Big Orange Chorus also won the 2018 Sunshine District chorus championship (their 10th time).

The chorus uses technology to support ongoing vocal development. Digital learning materials in addition to specialized rehearsal approaches and methodologies enable Big Orange Chorus singers to develop skills in preparation for regional performances as well as international contests. The result of these efforts helps to improve the quality of male a cappella singing not only within this chorus but also among similar choruses in the Southeastern United States.

The chorus is also referred to by the nickname "The Big O".

== International competition ==
The chorus has competed internationally nine times within the Barbershop Harmony Society. Their highest ranking was in 1986 when they placed eighth among all competitors.

=== Appearances ===
1985	1986	1987	1990	1991	2010	2011	2012	2015	2018
10th	8th	10th	13th	10th	19th	18th	17th	9th*	15th

* Ninth-place finish in 2015 singing under Heralds of Harmony banner

== Selection of songs list ==
Songs performed on the Barbershop Harmony Society's International stage:

- "Who Can I Turn To?" 2018
- "Gonna Build A Mountain" 2018
- "From The First Hello To The Last Goodbye" 2015
- "Eyes (Medley)" 2015
- "It's You" 2012
- "Fit As A Fiddle/For Me And My Gal (Medley)" 2012
- "The Little Boy" 2011
- "I Wanna Be Like You" 2011
- "I've Been Working on the Railroad" 2010
- "Ya Gotta Know How To Dance (Medley)" 2010
- "The Sunshine of Your Smile" 1990
