= Keepsake (quartet) =

Barbershop quartet

- Genres: Barbershop
- Members: Roger Ross – tenor Joe Connelly – lead Tony DeRosa – baritone Don Barnick – bass
- Website: Official site

Keepsake was an American barbershop quartet from Florida that won the 1992 SPEBSQSA International Barbershop Competition. Members of the quartet are Joe Connelly (lead), Tony DeRosa (baritone), Don Barnick (bass), and Roger Ross (tenor).

== Discography ==
- The Entertainer (CD)
- Once Upon a Time (CD)
- Without A Song (CD; 1992)

They also appear on the Heralds of Harmony CD This Joint Is Jumpin.

Preceded by The Ritz	SPEBSQSA International Quartet Champions; 1992	Succeeded by Gas House Gang
