= Main Street (quartet) =

Barbershop quartet

- Genres: Barbershop
- Years active: 2011–present
- Members: Roger Ross – tenor Tony DeRosa – lead Mike McGee – baritone Myron Whittlesey – bass
- Website: mainstreetquartet.weebly.com

Main Street is a barbershop quartet that started singing as a group on March 20, 2011.

The quartet has won several awards, culminating in their 2017 win of the Barbershop Harmony Society's International Quartet Championship in Las Vegas, Nevada. Main Street participates in shows all over the United States, and all four members have been or are currently performing at Walt Disney World with the Dapper Dans and/or the Voices of Liberty.

== Members ==
The members of Main Street have over 100 years of combined barbershop experience which includes thirteen International competition medals (4 gold, 6 silver, 3 bronze), two International collegiate medals, and eleven District quartet championships. Tony DeRosa received an additional International gold medal in 2024.

DeRosa and Mike McGee have directed several choruses to District championships and competed as representatives at the International chorus competitions. Roger Ross has volunteered for several years as a Presentation judge for barbershop competitions and served in administrative positions, most notably as President of the Association of International Champions.

Ross and DeRosa have been inducted into the BHS Sunshine District Hall of Fame for their work in helping promote barbershop and the district in the state of Florida. Ross has also been named Barbershopper of the Year.

== Awards ==
- 2017 International 1st Place Medalists
- 2016 International 3rd Place Medalists
- 2015 International 3rd Place Medalists
- 2014 International 3rd Place Medalists
- 2013 International 4th Place Medalists
- 2012 International 5th Place Medalists
- 2011 International 5th Place Medalists
- 2011 Sunshine District Quartet Champions

== Discography ==
- Smile (2018)
- Banjo, Bills, & Barbershop (2021)

Preceded by Forefront	SPEBSQSA International Quartet Champions; 2017	Succeeded by After Hours
