= Turn Around, Look at Me =

Song written by Jerry Capehart and Glen Campbell

Single by Glen Campbell
- B-side: "Brenda"
- Released: October 1961
- Genre: Country
- Length: 2:35
- Label: Crest Records
- Songwriter: Jerry Capehart

Glen Campbell singles chronology
"Turn Around, Look at Me" (1961)	"Too Late to Worry, Too Blue to Cry" (1962)

"Turn Around, Look at Me"

Single by Barry Gibb and the Bee Gees
- B-side: "(Theme From) The Travels Of Jamie McPheeters"
- Released: October 1964
- Recorded: September 1964; Festival Studio, Sydney, Australia
- Genre: Country
- Label: Leedon
- Songwriter: Jerry Capehart

Barry Gibb and the Bee Gees singles chronology
"Claustrophobia" (1964)	"Turn Around, Look at Me" (1964)	"Everyday I Have to Cry" (1965)

"Turn Around, Look at Me"

Single by the Vogues

from the album Turn Around, Look at Me
- B-side: "Then"
- Released: June 1968
- Recorded: 1968
- Genre: Pop
- Length: 2:43
- Label: Reprise
- Songwriter: Jerry Capehart
- Producer: Dick Glasser

The Vogues singles chronology
"That's the Tune" (1966)	"Turn Around, Look at Me" (1968)	"My Special Angel" (1968)

"Turn Around, Look at Me" is a song written by Jerry Capehart and Glen Campbell, though Campbell is not officially credited.

In 1961, Glen Campbell released his version as a single. This was his first song to achieve national success by means of two hit parades in the United States, hitting position No.62 on the Billboard Hot 100 hit parades and peaking at position No.15 on the Adult Contemporary hit parades. In Canada, this tune had reached No.9 in the CHUM Hit Parades. This version included session drummer Earl Palmer on drums.

== The Lettermen version ==
The Lettermen
"Turn Around, Look at Me" / "How Is Julie?"
Review scores
Source	Rating
Billboard	positive

In 1962, the Lettermen released their version as a single. It made it to No.5 on Billboard's Bubbling Under Hot 100 Singles chart, but the b-side of the single, "How Is Julie?" became the bigger hit.

== Bee Gees version ==
In 1964, while Bee Gees were still in Australia, they released their take on the song which did not chart. It is also their fifth single, and was credited to "Barry Gibb and the Bee Gees". It was also included on the group's 1967 mop-up compilation Turn Around, Look at Us and the 1998 anthology of their Australian recordings Brilliant from Birth.

=== Personnel ===
- Barry Gibb — lead vocals
- Robin Gibb — harmony and backing vocals
- Maurice Gibb — harmony and backing vocals, guitar
- Uncredited musicians — bass, drums, orchestra, chorus

== The Vogues' version ==
In 1968, the Vogues released their remake as a single. This version was by far the most successful, reaching No.7 on the Hot 100 and No.3 on the Adult Contemporary chart. In 2019 it was used in a Volkswagen commercial.

=== Charts ===
==== Weekly charts ====
Chart (1968)	Peak position
Australia KMR	43
Canada RPM Top Singles	5
US Billboard Hot 100	7
US Adult Contemporary (Billboard)	3
US Cash Box Top 100	4

==== Year-end charts ====
Chart (1968)	Rank
Canada	32
US Billboard Hot 100	24
US Cash Box Top 100	34
