= Sweet Adelines International chorus competitions, 2000–2009 =

2000s Sweet Adelines chorus competition results

The results of the Sweet Adelines International competition for choruses in the years 2000–2009 are as follows.

For the equivalent scores in the quartet competition see Sweet Adelines International quartet competitions, 2000–2009 and for a full explanation of the scoring system, qualification process, awards and records, see Sweet Adelines International competition.

Note that the grand total listed in the "final" column is the cumulative total of scores achieved in the semi-final and final rounds of competition. In addition to the direct-qualifying places, wildcard places were awarded to the five highest-scoring second-place quartets across all regional competitions beginning in 2002, indicated herein as "[wild]". The winner of the Harmony Achievement award is indicated with "[harmony achievement]" next to the chorus' name.

== 2000 ==
Orlando, Florida (2000)Official results
Place	Region	Contestant	Regional	Semi-final			Final		
Place	Region	Contestant	Score	# on stage	Order of appearance	Score	Order of appearance	Score	Grand total
1	3	Melodeers	678	136	missing	1406	6	1525	2931
2	21	Scottsdale	667	140	missing	1449	1	1477	2926
3	13	Pacific Sound	668	149	missing	1405	8	1432	2837
4	4	Gem City	665	150	missing	1354	7	1423	2777
5	6	City of Lakes	660	112	missing	1323	5	1409	2732
6	10	Houston Horizon	665	101	missing	1322	3	1375	2697
7	15	Ramapo Valley	648	84	missing	1308	10	1368	2676
8	12	Pacific Empire	664	121	missing	1297	2	1289	2586
9	9	Toast of Tampa Show Chorus	646	96	missing	1284	9	1300	2584
10	23	Song of Atlanta	607	133	missing	1235	4	1283	2518
11	8	Skyline	609	119	missing	1219	—	—	—
12	5	River Blenders	622	91	missing	1214	—	—	—
13	2	Spirit of Detroit	644	42	missing	1190	—	—	—
14	19	Eklridge	625	82	missing	1171	—	—	—
15	25	Top of the Rock ^{[harmony achievement]}	619	70	missing	1163	—	—	—
16	11	Verdugo Hills	609	88	missing	1157	—	—	—
17	26	Lions Gate	630	70	missing	1152	—	—	—
18	1	Yankee Maid	613	76	missing	1149	—	—	—
19	22	Crosstown Harmony	608	83	missing	1139	—	—	—
20	32	Stockholm City Voices	621	78	missing	1134	—	—	—
21	16	Capitaland	605	79	missing	1116	—	—	—
22	14	Vienna-Falls	617	84	missing	1098	—	—	—
23	20	Lincolnaire	574	64	missing	1083	—	—	—
24	7	Wichita	594	76	missing	1071	—	—	—
25	35	Greater Auckland	585	67	missing	1040	—	—	—
26	17	City of Flags	593	53	missing	999	—	—	—
27	24	Columbia River	591	38	missing	933	—	—	—
28	31	Aberdeen	544	60	missing	867	—	—	—

== 2001 ==
Portland, Oregon (2001)Official results
Place	Region	Contestant	Regional	Semi-final			Final		
Place	Region	Contestant	Score	# on stage	Order of appearance	Score	Order of appearance	Score	Grand total
1	21	San Diego Chorus	690	144	29	1403	7	1504	2907
2	25	Rich-Tone	687	142	23	1408	4	1470	2878
3	19	Pride of Baltimore	644	77	22	1317	10	1360	2677
4	32	Rönninge Show ^{[harmony achievement]}	675	65	14	1311	6	1329	2640
5	12	Bay Area Showcase	661	128	16	1290	1	1311	2601
6	7	Kansas City	625	124	4	1240	2	1350	2590
7	3	Choral-Aires	657	103	25	1262	8	1308	2570
8	17	Pride of Toledo	661	99	17	1270	5	1290	2560
9	8	Mountain Jubilee	630	89	13	1214	3	1256	2470
10	24	Pride of Portland ^{[a]}	600	143	7	1215	9	1231	2446
11	4	Pride of Kentucky	656	71	24	1213	—	—	—
12	15	Greater Nassau	635	83	8	1196	—	—	—
13	10	Alamo Metro	624	91	9	1195	—	—	—
14	9	Jacksonville Harmony	628	77	26	1180	—	—	—
15	2	London	634	84	15	1177	—	—	—
16	16	Greater Kingston	629	89	18	1174	—	—	—
17	35	Christchurch City	606	85	1	1136	—	—	—
18	34	Perth Harmony	640	95	30	1133	—	—	—
19	26	Westcoast Harmony	611	99	3	1132	—	—	—
20	20	Iowa City	591	59	5	1103	—	—	—
21	13	Spokane Falls	623	74	6	1098	—	—	—
22	5	St. Louis Harmony	607	69	10	1084	—	—	—
23	11	California Heartland	611	68	27	1078	—	—	—
24	23	Smoky Mountain Harmony	611	68	21	1068	—	—	—
25	1	Sound of New England	611	76	20	1053	—	—	—
26	14	Queen Charlotte	607	missing	28	1038	—	—	—
27	22	Riverport	601	missing	12	1028	—	—	—
28	6	Acappella Xpress	597	missing	19	989	—	—	—
29	31	Surrey Harmony	541	missing	11	965	—	—	—
30	33	Flying High Singers	565	missing	2	926	—	—	—

^{a} "Blue Lake" was the second place chorus in Region 24's competition in 2000. The winner, "Willamette Sound", was dissolved and absorbed into "Blue Lake", which was renamed and competed at the 2001 international competition as "Pride of Portland".

== 2002 ==
Nashville, Tennessee (2002)Official results
Place	Region	Contestant	Regional	Semi-final			Final		
Place	Region	Contestant	Score	# on stage	Order of appearance	Score	Order of appearance	Score	Grand total
1	16	North Metro	728	175	6	1440	10	1543	2983
2	4	Gem City	683	127	26	1374	6	1453	2827
3	21	Scottdale	685	134	32	1381	2	1436	2817
4	21 ^{[wild]}	Harborlites	672	101	21	1322	9	1429	2751
5	13	Pacific Sound	681	131	25	1334	7	1409	2743
6	8	Skyline	666	147	30	1342	4	1373	2715
7	32	Sunlight	699	84	3	1332	1	1329	2661
8	23	Song of Atlanta	640	140	16	1293	3	1322	2615
9	25	OK City	642	86	5	1258	8	1305	2563
10	10	Houston Horizon	646	98	22	1265	5	1386	2551
11	19	Harbor City Music Company	636	78	19	1229	—	—	—
12	12 ^{[wild]}	Pacific Empire	632	108	10	1228	—	—	—
13	9 ^{[wild]}	Spirit of the Gulf	633	125	11	1225	—	—	—
14	11	ChannelAire	639	113	33	1214	—	—	—
15	15	Ramapo Valley ^{[harmony achievement]}	646	63	12	1212	—	—	—
16	9	Sound of Sunshine	641	100	7	1202	—	—	—
17	24	Pride of Portland	632	105	2	1196	—	—	—
18	6	City of Lakes	690	97	28	1190	—	—	—
19	5	River Blenders	645	106	8	1189	—	—	—
20	4 ^{[wild]}	Capital City	632	112	24	1178	—	—	—
21	12	Mission Valley	639	75	9	1159	—	—	—
22	16 ^{[wild]}	Canadian Showtime	621	102	27	1141	—	—	—
23	1	Yankee Maid	639	83	4	1126	—	—	—
24	22	Crosstown Harmony	621	70	20	1119	—	—	—
25	17	Greater Cleveland	613	75	17	1115	—	—	—
26	20	Lincolnaire	611	62	13	1093	—	—	—
27	2	Great Lakes	604	79	29	1075	—	—	—
28	14	Greater Richmond	616	58	23	1045	—	—	—
29	3	Grand Rapids	601	90	14	1019	—	—	—
30	35	Waikato Rivertones	547	53	1	1009	—	—	—
31	26	Gateway	585	90	15	996	—	—	—
32	7	Sunflower Harmony	583	48	18	985	—	—	—
33	31	Aberdeen	589	47	31	979	—	—	—

== 2003 ==
Phoenix, Arizona (2003)Official results
Place	Region	Contestant	Regional	Semi-final			Final		
Place	Region	Contestant	Score	# on stage	Order of appearance	Score	Order of appearance	Score	Grand total
1	3	Melodeers	678	128	32	1459	8	1510	2969
2	19	Pride of Baltimore	665	99	21	1376	9	1465	2841
3	25	Rich-Tone	669	124	22	1386	5	1454	2840
4	9	Toast of Tampa Show	674	121	4	1320	2	1391	2711
5	7	Kansas City	633	116	17	1302	4	1346	2648
6	12	Bay Area Showcase	659	125	18	1309	1	1299	2608
7	8	Velvet Hills	640	92	35	1245	7	1316	2561
8	3 ^{[wild]}	Choral-Aires	637	94	19	1349	3	1303	2552
9	1	Coastline Show	644	106	14	1278	6	1249	2527
10	2	Spirit of Detroit	635	79	12	1234	10	1228	2462
11	26	Lions Gate	641	91	26	1223	—	—	—
12	11	Celebrity City	630	103	27	1218	—	—	—
13	4	Pride of Kentucky	611	75	33	1211	—	—	—
14	16	Capitaland	630	87	13	1209	—	—	—
15	16 ^{[wild]}	Spirit of Syracuse	624	99	11	1195	—	—	—
16	10	Alamo Metro	625	82	3	1181	—	—	—
17	15	Greater Nassau	632	78	7	1177	—	—	—
18	1 ^{[wild]}	Royal River ^{[harmony achievement]}	633	67	28	1175	—	—	—
19	11 ^{[wild]}	Verdugo Hills	626	85	16	1169	—	—	—
20	17	Pride of Toledo	632	86	23	1168	—	—	—
21	26 ^{[wild]}	Westcoast Harmony	638	99	5	1149	—	—	—
22	21	Enchanted Mesa Show	588	99	34	1125	—	—	—
23	23	Smoky Mountain Harmony	611	84	30^{[b]}	1120	—	—	—
24	35	Greater Auckland	605	72	31	1118	—	—	—
25	13	Spokane Falls	612	65	6	1101	—	—	—
26	5	Heart of Illinois	621	92	8	1084	—	—	—
27	14	Potomac Harmony	606	96	20	1073	—	—	—
28	6	Vallee de Croix	602	57	24	1055	—	—	—
29	34	Perth Harmony	625	35	10	1054	—	—	—
30	5	Metro Mix^{[a]}	601	62	15	1021	—	—	—
31	22	Riverport	576	54	25	1010	—	—	—
32	31	Surrey Harmony	579	65	9	971	—	—	—
33	24	Northwest Harmony	539	27	2^{[b]}	919	—	—	—

^{a} Metro Mix qualified in region 20 as Iowa City but competed representing region 5 due to regional boundary changes before the competition.

^{b} Flying High Singers qualified and were to compete in position number 1, and Stockholm in position 29. Both withdrew from the competition before it began. Therefore, Northwest Harmony competed first but are officially listed as contestant number 2. Likewise Smoky Mountain Harmony competed 28th but were officially contestant 30.

== 2004 ==
Indianapolis, Indiana (2004)Official results
Place	Region	Contestant	Regional	Semi-final			Final		
Place	Region	Contestant	Score	# on stage	Order of appearance	Score	Order of appearance	Score	Grand total
1	21	Harborlites	699	119	22	1390	1	1529	2919
2	8	Skyline	670	155	10	1376	6	1408	2784
3	4	Gem City	690	142	16	1360	4	1398	2758
4	32	Rönninge Show	662	95	24	1344	5	1411	2755
5	21 ^{[wild]}	San Diego	695	115	2	1327	7	1419	2746
6	13	Pacific Sound	660	114	28	1322	8	1368	2690
7	24	Pride of Portland	631	111	30	1312	10	1298	2610
8	6	City of Lakes	657	77	11	1284	9	1295	2579
9	9	Spirit of the Gulf	656	135	14	1290	2	1258	2548
10	11	ChannelAire	634	105	21	1273	3	1239	2512
11	12	Pacific Empire	636	87	5	1267	—	—	—
12	25	OK City	642	88	25	1257	—	—	—
13	5	River Blenders	660	106	29	1256	—	—	—
14	4 ^{[wild]}	Capital City	669	102	18	1255	—	—	—
15	1	Harmony on the Sound^{[a]}	617	85	31	1244	—	—	—
16	23	Song of Atlanta	648	115	4	1235	—	—	—
17	12 ^{[wild]}	Mission Valley	612	76	20	1204	—	—	—
18	19	Harbor City Music Company	621	78	9	1188	—	—	—
19	16	Canadian Showtime	624	92	17	1143	—	—	—
20	5 ^{[wild]}	St. Louis Harmony ^{[harmony achievement]}	635	71	32	1136	—	—	—
21	15	Hickory Tree	616	71	13	1125	—	—	—
22	9 ^{[wild]}	Sound of Sunshine	615	78	8^{[b]}	1124	—	—	—
23	2	London	608	73	19	1120	—	—	—
24	3	Prairie Echoes	596	37	15	1109	—	—	—
25	17	Greater Cleveland	605	68	27	1096	—	—	—
26	35	Christchurch City	599	56	26	1073	—	—	—
27	26	Gateway	581	66	1	1068	—	—	—
28	7	Wichita	613	65	3	1065	—	—	—
29	10	Lone Star	605	85	12	1051	—	—	—
30	14	Queen Charlotte	617	55	23	1038	—	—	—
31	22	Crosstown Harmony	606	51	6	978	—	—	—

^{a} Harmony on the Sound qualified at regional competition as Yankee Maid but changed its name before the international competition.

^{b} Aberdeen qualified and were to compete in position number 7 but withdrew from the competition before it began. Therefore, Sound of Sunshine competed 7th but are officially listed as contestant number 8.

== 2005 ==
Detroit, Michigan (2005)Official results
Place	Region	Contestant	Regional	Semi-final			Final		
Place	Region	Contestant	Score	# on stage	Order of appearance	Score	Order of appearance	Score	Grand total
1	21	Scottsdale	659	130	11	1400	10	1499	2899
2	19	Pride of Baltimore Chorus	669	115	27	1410	3	1462	2872
3	7	Kansas City	678	141	23	1350	7	1370	2720
4	1	Coastline Show	648	107	15	1308	8	1368	2676
5	9	Toast of Tampa Show Chorus	672	134	18	1332	1	1318	2650
6	3	Choral-Aires	633	90	22	1265	6	1358	2623
7	10	Houston Horizon	647	110	17	1252	9	1314	2566
8	11	Celebrity City	618	94	7	1278	4	1258	2536
9	4	Pride of Kentucky	641	81	20	1249	2	1237	2486
10	15 ^{[wild]}	Greater Nassau ^{[harmony achievement]}	627	67	5	1242	5	1224	2466
11	12	Bay Area Showcase	621	116	32^{[a]}	1224	—	—	—
12	26	Lions Gate	626	91	2	1222	—	—	—
13	2	Spirit of Detroit	634	78	9	1219	—	—	—
14	8	Mountain Jubilee	623	89	26	1213	—	—	—
15	16 ^{[wild]}	Spirit of Syracuse	617	83	34	1203	—	—	—
16	15	Ramapo Valley	644	80	21	1190	—	—	—
17	35	Greater Auckland	618	89	16	1178	—	—	—
18	17	Pride of Toledo	618	94	25	1165	—	—	—
19	10 ^{[wild]}	Alamo Metro	627	63	4	1165	—	—	—
20	9 ^{[wild]}	Jacksonville Harmony	621	78	30	1112	—	—	—
21	16	Capitaland	630	80	12	1112	—	—	—
22	25	Top of the Rock	606	68	8	1101	—	—	—
23	5	Metro Mix	612	68	24	1100	—	—	—
24	24	Five Valley	563	111	28	1092	—	—	—
25	1 ^{[wild]}	Royal River	620	55	14	1082	—	—	—
26	34	Perth Harmony	634	47	33	1075	—	—	—
27	14	Potomac Harmony	615	87	3	1059	—	—	—
28	13	Spirit of Spokane	604	67	6	1058	—	—	—
29	31	Lace City Singers	611	86	19	1057	—	—	—
30	23	Smoky Mountain Harmony	615	90	29	1052	—	—	—
31	6	Vallee de Croix	612	51	10	1014	—	—	—
32	33	Flying High Singers	525	49	1	962	—	—	—
33	22	Riverport	613	57	13	915	—	—	—

^{a} Sunlight chorus qualified and were to compete in position number 31 but withdrew from the competition before it began. Therefore, Bay Area Showcase competed 31st but are officially listed as contestant number 32.

== 2006 ==
Las Vegas, Nevada (2006)Official results
Place	Region	Contestant	Regional	Semi-final			Final		
Place	Region	Contestant	Score	# on stage	Order of appearance	Score	Order of appearance	Score	Grand total
1	25	Rich-Tone	679	119	32	1431	3	1493	2942
2	3	Melodeers	678	153	6	1431	4	1493	2924
3	16	North Metro	712	180	15	1430	10	1435	2865
4	8	Skyline	688	170	33	1374	2	1453	2827
5	4	Gem City	691	119	31	1390	5	1404	2794
6	21	San Diego	674	100	19	1370	8	1421	2791
7	9	Spirit of the Gulf	665	134	13	1303	9	1405	2708
8	13	Pacific Sound	656	126	21	1306	7	1349	2655
9	11	Channelaire	656	110	14	1314	6	1323	2637
10	8 ^{[wild]}	Velvet Hills	644	107	11	1305	1	1324	2629
11	12	Pacific Empire	646	117	24	1288	—	—	—
12	23	Song of Atlanta	652	102	30	1264	—	—	—
13	6	City of Lakes	647	82	27	1262	—	—	—
14	24	Pride of Portland	640	114	20	1244	—	—	—
15	5	River Blenders	648	112	23	1228	—	—	—
16	25 ^{[wild]}	OK City ^{[harmony achievement]}	646	75	8	1216	—	—	—
17	19	Greater Harrisburg	630	95	22	1191	—	—	—
18	1	Sound of New England	617	85	25	1169	—	—	—
19	16 ^{[wild]}	Canadian Showtime	629	95	17	1157	—	—	—
20	35	Wellington City	617	66	10	1155	—	—	—
21	32	Vasterås	602	82	18	1093	—	—	—
22	17	Greater Cleveland	606	57	26	1087	—	—	—
23	31	Surrey Harmony	597	73	29	1083	—	—	—
24	9 ^{[wild]}	Sound of Sunshine	630	67	28	1083	—	—	—
25	15	Hickory Tree	608	62	4	1067	—	—	—
26	7	Wichita	581	55	3	1065	—	—	—
27	26	Westcoast Harmony	609	61	2	1053	—	—	—
28	2	Shoreline Sound	615	88	9	1048	—	—	—
29	12 ^{[wild]}	Mission Valley	633	49	5	1048	—	—	—
30	10	Lone Star	601	66	7	1024	—	—	—
31	22	Crosstown Harmony	591	61	12	1017	—	—	—
32	34	Melbourne	603	56	1	1000	—	—	—
33	14	Greater Richmond	609	61	16	1000	—	—	—

== 2007 ==
Calgary, Alberta, Canada (2007)Official results
Place	Region	Contestant	Regional	Semi-final			Final		
Place	Region	Contestant	Score	# on stage	Order of appearance	Score	Order of appearance	Score	Grand total
1	21	Harborlites	729	128	7	1440	6	1545	2985
2	19	Pride of Baltimore	725	110	22	1459	5	1485	2944
3	26	Lions Gate	644	110	16	1373	7	1442	2815
4	1	Coastline Show	662	104	8	1323	3	1376	2699
5	7	Kansas City	662	134	14	1349	1	1337	2686
6	9	Toast of Tampa Show	681	108	28	1330	2	1348	2678
7	15	Greater Nassau	646	71	29	1280	10	1323	2603
8	8	Mountain Jubilee	628	89	6	1280	4	1320	2600
9	35	Christchurch City	666	127	11	1308	8	1291	2599
10	3	Choral-Aires	650	89	23	1283	9	1296	2579
11	4	Pride of Kentucky	655	80	30	1264	—	—	—
12	4 ^{[wild]}	Capital City	644	96	20	1235	—	—	—
13	23	Tune Town Show	623	92	5	1234	—	—	—
14	10	Houston Horizon	615	99	24	1228	—	—	—
15	12	Bay Area Showcase	624	114	18	1217	—	—	—
16	17	Pride of Toledo	609	78	34	1200	—	—	—
17	16	Spirit of Syracuse	624	73	9	1193	—	—	—
18	31	Lace City Singers	592	84	31	1192	—	—	—
19	16 ^{[wild]}	Greater Kingston	617	79	3	1187	—	—	—
20	2	Spirit of Detroit ^{[harmony achievement]}	636	65	12	1169	—	—	—
21	32	Harmony Heights	578	63	26	1157	—	—	—
22	35 ^{[wild]}	Greater Auckland	639	58	33	1154	—	—	—
23	9 ^{[wild]}	Jacksonville Harmony	632	80	15	1147	—	—	—
24	11	Celebrity City	633	76	13	1143	—	—	—
25	14	Potomac Harmony	624	87	21	1124	—	—	—
26	19 ^{[wild]}	Harbor City Music Company	619	69	10	1123	—	—	—
27	34	Endeavour Harmony	613	53	1	1112	—	—	—
28	25	Top of the Rock	589	57	17	1109	—	—	—
29	5	Heart of Illinois	596	70	4	1064	—	—	—
30	24	Five Valley	604	95	19	1051	—	—	—
31	6	Twin Cities Show	584	57	25	1030	—	—	—
32	13	Spirit of Spokane	595	73	32	993	—	—	—
33	33	Flying High Singers	567	41	2	964	—	—	—
34	22	Riverport	585	48	27	893	—	—	—

== 2008 ==
Honolulu, Hawaii (2008)Official results
Place	Region	Contestant	Regional	Semi-final			Final		
Place	Region	Contestant	Score	# on stage	Order of appearance	Score	Order of appearance	Score	Grand total
1	3	Melodeers	741	141	17	1480	4	1543	3023
2	16	North Metro	731	165	21	1367	2	1470	2837
3	21	Scottsdale	724	133	10	1395	6	1420	2815
4	8	Skyline	663	149	23	1394	1	1394	2788
5	32	Rönninge Show	661	123	11	1354	5	1415	2769
6	23	Song of Atlanta	661	106	16	1323	3	1340	2663
7	21 ^{[wild]}	San Diego	681	84	3	1312	7	1345	2657
8	9	Spirit of the Gulf	680	150	12	1298	9	1348	2646
9	24	Pride of Portland	661	126	27	1393	8	1313	2606
10	16 ^{[wild]}	Buffalo Gateway	663	77	33	1303	10	1240	2543
11	12	Pacific Empire	645	96	18	1273	—	—	—
12	6	City of Lakes	637	84	24	1254	—	—	—
13	11	ChannelAire	655	92	31	1232	—	—	—
14	25	OK City	617	73	26	1230	—	—	—
15	19	Greater Harrisburg	634	79	19	1227	—	—	—
16	34	Perth Harmony	624	77	6	1192	—	—	—
17	13	Pacific Sound	623	89	13	1179	—	—	—
18	5	St. Louis Harmony ^{[harmony achievement]}	646	70	2	1176	—	—	—
19	1 ^{[wild]}	Sound of New England	634	80	25	1171	—	—	—
20	31	Phoenix	626	76	20	1163	—	—	—
21	26	Westcoast Harmony	635	49	14	1160	—	—	—
22	5 ^{[wild]}	River Blenders	625	77	32	1143	—	—	—
23	1	Harmony on the Sound	645	78	4	1139	—	—	—
24	10	Alamo Metro	563	56	9	1106	—	—	—
25	17	Greater Cleveland	628	60	29	1097	—	—	—
26	35	Wellington City	621	79	1	1092	—	—	—
27	15	Hickory Tree	606	49	15	1075	—	—	—
28	2	Great Lakes	619	69	5	1070	—	—	—
29	11 ^{[wild]}	Voices Unlimited	621	32	30	1068	—	—	—
30	14	Greater Richmond	605	63	22	1066	—	—	—
31	4	Cincinnati Sound	586	96	7	1061	—	—	—
32	22	Crosstown Harmony	599	55	28	1016	—	—	—
33	7	Sound of the Heartland	608	63	8	1013	—	—	—

== 2009 ==
Nashville, Tennessee (2009)Official results
Place	Region	Contestant	Regional	Semi-final			Final		
Place	Region	Contestant	Score	# on stage	Order of appearance	Score	Order of appearance	Score	Grand total
1	25	Rich-Tone	725	122	10	1480	5	1574	3054
2	26	Lions Gate	680	118	16	1488	6	1527	3015
3	4	Pride Of Kentucky	690	126	20	1404	1	1431	2835
4	15	Greater Nassau	638	74	12	1328	4	1389	2717
5	8	Velvet Hills	662	97	26	1312	3	1376	2688
6	4 ^{[wild]}	Gem City	650	112	7	1328	7	1345	2973
7	1	Coastline Show	689	90	8	1316	8	1355	2671
8	7	Kansas City	654	104	6	1310	9	1334	2644
9	9	Toast of Tampa Show	659	105	11	1315	2	1325	2640
10	8 ^{[wild]}	Mountain Jubilee	640	83	18	1285	10	1319	2604
11	10	Houston Horizon	648	91	3	1269	—	—	—
12	12	Bay Area Showcase	645	95	13	1256	—	—	—
13	3	Choral-Aires	641	94	17	1242	—	—	—
14	2	Spirit of Detroit	648	82	24	1239	—	—	—
15	31 ^{[wild]}	Surrey Harmony	645	73	31	1237	—	—	—
16	23	TuneTown Show	635	92	27	1237	—	—	—
17	19 ^{[wild]}	Harbor City Music Company ^{[harmony achievement]}	621	58	32	1222	—	—	—
18	13	Alaska Sound Celebration	616	75	19	1205	—	—	—
19	1 ^{[wild]}	Royal River	646	62	30	1184	—	—	—
20	31	Lace City	669	84	15	1168	—	—	—
21	11	Celebrity City	613	70	29	1168	—	—	—
22	23 ^{[wild]}	Metro Nashville	629	39	14	1155	—	—	—
23	16	Canadian Showtime	612	80	33	1150	—	—	—
24	17	Sounds of Pittsburgh	631	80	22	1120	—	—	—
25	34	Circular Keys	596	68	2	1110	—	—	—
26	24	Five Valley	619	74	21	1087	—	—	—
27	35	Waikato Rivertones	624	68	1	1079	—	—	—
28	6	Twin Cities Show	610	64	23	1076	—	—	—
29	14	Vienna-Falls	611	69	25	1063	—	—	—
30	5	City Voices	608	55	5	1057	—	—	—
31	22	Fox Valley	604	52	4	1010	—	—	—
32	21	Tucson Desert Harmony	602	69	28	1006	—	—	—

== Sources ==
- Sweet Adelines International homepage
  - "Competition Handbook" (PDF). Sweet Adelines International. 2015. Archived (PDF) from the original on 27 January 2015.
- Barbershophistory.com homepage
  - historical chorus results
  - competition records
- Sweet Adelines Scores Yahoo! Group [registration required]
