= Sweet Adelines International chorus competitions, 2010–2019 =

2010s Sweet Adelines chorus competition results

The results of the Sweet Adelines International competition for choruses in 2010–2019 are as follows.

For the equivalent scores in the quartet competition, see Sweet Adelines International quartet competitions, 2010–2019, and for a full explanation of the scoring system, qualification process, awards, and records, see Sweet Adelines International competition.

Note that the total listed in the "final" column is the cumulative total of scores achieved in the semi-final and final rounds of competition. In addition to the direct-qualifying places, wildcard places are awarded to the 10 highest-scoring second-place choruses (or the top five before 2015) across all regional competitions, indicated herein as "[wild]." The winner of the Harmony Achievement award is indicated with "[harmony achievement]" next to the chorus' name.

== 2010 ==
Seattle, Washington (2010)Official results
Place	Region	Contestant	Regional	Semi-final			Final		
Place	Region	Contestant	Score	# on stage	Order of appearance	Score	Order of appearance	Score	Grand total
1	21 ^{[wild]}	Scottsdale	689	116	22	1502	6	1575	3077
2	21	Harborlites	736	124	21	1488	8	1523	3011
3	16	North Metro	723	139	32	1480	7	1478	2958
4	23	Song of Atlanta	668	110	16	1423	5	1445	2868
5	8	Skyline	683	139	31	1387	4	1459	2846
6	9	Spirit of the Gulf	683	153	7	1340	2	1380	2720
7	32	Stockholm City Voices ^{[harmony achievement]}	622	39	29	1295	1	1370	2665
8	16 ^{[wild]}	Buffalo Gateway	672	83	13	1338	3	1324	2662
9	24	Pride of Portland	657	100	17	1306	10	1303	2609
10	6	City of Lakes	632	91	19	1279	9	1291	2570
11	4	Capital City	653	80	1	1247	—	—	—
12	15	Harmony Celebration	662	56	6	1245	—	—	—
13	25	OK City	648	91	27	1234	—	—	—
14	1	Sound of New England	649	73	20	1234	—	—	—
15	34	Endeavour Harmony	652	79	24	1221	—	—	—
16	19	Greater Harrisburg	645	71	18	1213	—	—	—
17	3	Grand Rapids	615	74	23	1199	—	—	—
18	11	ChannelAire	657	76	4	1192	—	—	—
19	15 ^{[wild]}	Liberty Oak	640	77	3	1168	—	—	—
20	17	Greater Cleveland	615	58	30	1167	—	—	—
21	5	St Louis Harmony	637	76	26	1159	—	—	—
22	10	Alamo Metro	636	57	14	1149	—	—	—
23	2	Great Lakes	628	62	33	1149	—	—	—
24	31	Forth Valley	611	88	25	1144	—	—	—
25	13	Pacific Sound	585	65	11	1134	—	—	—
26	14	Greater Richmond	635	60	15	1111	—	—	—
27	9 ^{[wild]}	Jacksonville Harmony	644	49	10	1111	—	—	—
28	22	River City Sound	595	44	28	1091	—	—	—
29	12	Pacific Empire	643	66	8	1089	—	—	—
30	35	Greater Auckland	643	62	5	1085	—	—	—
31	11 ^{[wild]}	Verdugo Hills	637	64	12	1083	—	—	—
32	26	Gateway	616	60	2	1066	—	—	—
33	7	Wamego Dutch Mill	560	43	9	1020	—	—	—

== 2011 ==
Houston, Texas (2011)Official results
Place	Region	Contestant	Regional	Semi-final			Final		
Place	Region	Contestant	Score	# on stage	Order of appearance	Score	Order of appearance	Score	Grand total
1	3	Melodeers	751	missing	12	1510	2	1581	3091
2	32	Rönninge Show	700	missing	3	1459	10	1585	3044
3	26	Lions Gate	697	missing	9	1469	9	1543	3012
4	4 ^{[wild]}	Scioto Valley	638	missing	26	1366	8	1469	2835
5	9	Toast of Tampa Show	700	missing	6	1375	3	1404	2779
6	4	Pride of Kentucky	695	missing	1	1378	4	1388	2766
7	8	Mountain Jubilee	665	missing	14	1312	7	1437	2749
8	15	Greater Nassau	695	missing	16	1360	5	1381	2741
9	8 ^{[wild]}	Velvet Hills	664	missing	20	1332	1	1389	2721
10	3 ^{[wild]}	Choral-Aires	680	missing	7	1318	6	1394	2712
11	35	Christchurch City	677	104	24	1303	—	—	—
12	19	Pride of Baltimore	656	97	2	1302	—	—	—
13	1	Coastline Show	680	72	25	1289	—	—	—
14	2	Spirit of Detroit	636	74	29	1270	—	—	—
15	19 ^{[wild]}	Harbor City Music Company ^{[harmony achievement]}	633	65	32	1268	—	—	—
16	7	Kansas City	656	98	8	1262	—	—	—
17	21	San Diego	653	68	27	1261	—	—	—
18	10	Houston Horizon	640	119	18	1256	—	—	—
19	12	Bay Area Showcase	617	94	15	1213	—	—	—
20	14	Vienna-Falls	638	68	17	1210	—	—	—
21	23	TuneTown Show	649	77	23	1181	—	—	—
22	13	Alaska Sound Celebration	618	60	5	1171	—	—	—
23	5	River Blenders	619	63	4	1166	—	—	—
24	34	Perth Harmony	616	53	21	1162	—	—	—
25	31	Lace City	646	68	22	1160	—	—	—
26	16	Greater Kingston	626	58	10	1158	—	—	—
27	11	Celebrity City	603	59	13	1141	—	—	—
28	17	Pride of Toledo	602	80	33	1128	—	—	—
29	25	Top of the Rock	615	53	30	1123	—	—	—
30	31 ^{[wild]}	Surrey Harmony	626	73	28	1110	—	—	—
31	22	Crosstown Harmony	606	41	11	1056	—	—	—
32	24	Five Valley	605	62	31	1055	—	—	—
33	6	Twin Cities Show	608	53	19	1043	—	—	—

== 2012 ==
Denver, Colorado (2012)Official results
Place	Region	Contestant	Regional	Semi-final			Final			Competition video availability
Place	Region	Contestant	Score	# on stage	Order of appearance	Score	Order of appearance	Score	Grand total	Competition video availability
1	16	North Metro	700	135	25	1484	1	1574	3058	semi-final final
2	25	Rich-Tone	741	115	5	1476	10	1573	3049	semi-final final
3	21	Harborlites	707	105	20	1502	6	1514	3016	semi-final final
4	8	Skyline	701	145	17	1435	4	1440	2875	semi-final final
5	23	Song of Atlanta	701	106	26	1394	9	1461	2855	semi-final final
6	9	Spirit of the Gulf	672	149	4	1384	7	1409	2793	semi-final —
7	6	City of Lakes	663	109	28	1348	3	1386	2734	semi-final —
8	24	Pride of Portland	676	92	10	1343	2	1361	2704	semi-final —
9	16 ^{[wild]}	Buffalo Gateway	680	88	7	1309	8	1354	2663	semi-final —
10	4	Capital City	676	75	2	1302	5	1348	2650	semi-final —
11	25 ^{[wild]}	OK City	650	79	31	1300	—	—	—	—
12	23 ^{[wild]}	Metro Nashville ^{[harmony achievement]}	645	41	15	1282	—	—	—	—
13	15	Harmony Celebration	654	50	14	1274	—	—	—	—
14	22	River City Sound	623	46	23	1206	—	—	—	—
15	1	Harmony on the Sound	639	69	16	1190	—	—	—	—
16	35 ^{[wild]}	Wellington City	620	48	24	1189	—	—	—	—
17	32	Harmony Heights	609	67	27	1181	—	—	—	—
18	12	Mission Valley	628	75	22	1181	—	—	—	—
19	15 ^{[wild]}	Liberty Oak	617	52	11	1163	—	—	—	—
20	10	Alamo Metro	611	61	13	1161	—	—	—	—
21	17	Greater Cleveland	600	65	3	1152	—	—	—	—
22	35	Waikato Rivertones	644	77	1	1145	—	—	—	—
23	3	Midwest Crossroad	628	41	12	1144	—	—	—	—
24	19	Upper Chesapeake	643	49	6	1137	—	—	—	—
25	31	Forth Valley	630	70	9	1135	—	—	—	—
26	5	St. Louis Harmony	627	39	32	1134	—	—	—	—
27	14	Carolina Style	614	51	21	1128	—	—	—	—
28	11	Santa Monica	598	42	18	1108	—	—	—	—
29	2	Great Lakes	624	61	19	1105	—	—	—	—
30	34	Circular Keys	610	63	29	1091	—	—	—	—
31	13	A Cappella Joy	591	46	33	1067	—	—	—	—
32	7	Wamego Dutch Mill	596	52	30	1061	—	—	—	—
33	26	City of Gardens	613	64	8	1033	—	—	—	—

== 2013 ==
Honolulu, Hawaii (2013)Official results
Place	Region	Contestant	Regional	Semi-final			Final			Competition video availability
Place	Region	Contestant	Score	# on stage	Order of appearance	Score	Order of appearance	Score	Grand total	Competition video availability
1	32	Rönninge Show	749	132	12	1528	10	1610	3138	semi-final final
2	21	Scottsdale	736	124	16	1443	8	1656	3008	semi-final final
3	9	Toast of Tampa Show	681	118	27	1447	4	1499	2946	semi-final final
4	4	Scioto Valley	684	106	17	1420	9	1484	2904	semi-final final
5	26	Lions Gate	692	108	20	1412	3	1465	2877	semi-final final
6	35	Christchurch City	677	131	23	1354	1	1391	2745	semi-final final
7	15	Greater Nassau ^{[harmony achievement]}	686	57	21	1349	6	1388	2737	semi-final final
8	3	Choral-Aires	650	88	9	1317	7	1336	2653	semi-final final
9	32 ^{[wild]}	Stockholm City Voices	678	45	32	1294	2	1306	2600	semi-final final
10	21 ^{[wild]}	San Diego	642	66	22	1307	5	1246	2553	semi-final final
11	8	Velvet Hills	649	79	5	1283	—	—	—	—
12	7	Kansas City	646	70	11	1258	—	—	—	—
13	34	Endeavour Harmony	638	86	13	1244	—	—	—	—
14	13	Alaska Sound Celebration	647	67	10	1243	—	—	—	—
15	8 ^{[wild]}	Mountain Jubilee	629	85	24	1235	—	—	—	—
16	19 ^{[wild]}	Pride of Baltimore	672	83	15	1228	—	—	—	—
17	19	Harbor City Music Company	681	67	31	1226	—	—	—	—
18	16	Canadian Showtime	636	96	25	1212	—	—	—	—
19	2	Spirit of Detroit	653	70	2	1211	—	—	—	—
20	12	Bay Area Showcase	635	98	18	1196	—	—	—	—
21	14	Vienna-Falls	643	74	3	1195	—	—	—	—
22	31	Viva Acappella	639	34	28	1145	—	—	—	—
23	24	Cascade Harmony	610	51	1	1117	—	—	—	—
24	17	Pride of Toledo	610	62	14	1106	—	—	—	—
25	25	Talk of Tulsa Show	599	42	29	1098	—	—	—	—
26	10	Houston Horizon	620	69	6	1083	—	—	—	—
27	5	River Blenders	605	57	4	1063	—	—	—	—
28	1	Farmington Valley	601	45	7	1045	—	—	—	—
29	35 ^{[wild]}	Greater Auckland	626	62	19	1041	—	—	—	—
30	23	TuneTown Show	621	57	30	1037	—	—	—	—
31	22	Fox Valley	610	31	8	988	—	—	—	—
32	6	Twin Cities Show	602	46	26	973	—	—	—	

== 2014 ==
Baltimore, Maryland (2014)Official results
Place	Region	Contestant	Regional	Semi-final			Final			Competition video availability: Semi-finals Finals
Place	Region	Contestant	Score	# on stage	Order of appearance	Score	Order of appearance	Score	Grand total	Competition video availability: Semi-finals Finals
1	3	Melodeers	748	129	7	1515	10	1614	3129	semi-final final acceptance
2	25	Rich-Tone	748	112	18	1515	3	1570	3085	semi-final final
3	21	Harborlites	710	104	2	1441	9	1594	3035	semi-final final
4	24	Pride of Portland	692	102	17	1451	8	1494	2945	semi-final final
5	8	Skyline	683	122	33	1379	1	1411	2790	semi-final final
6	6	City of Lakes	655	105	26	1365	2	1419	2784	semi-final final
7	23	Metro Nashville ^{[harmony achievement]}	664	49	16	1341	7	1431	2772	semi-final final
8	4	Pride of Kentucky	692	88	1	1343	6	1376	2719	semi-final final
9	16	Buffalo Gateway	660	88	30	1316	5	1353	2669	semi-final final
10	9	Spirit of the Gulf	655	115	10	1295	4	1283	2578	semi-final final
11	25 ^{[wild]}	OK City	664	80	8	1286	—	—	—	—
12	23 ^{[wild]}	Song of Atlanta	645	81	21	1281	—	—	—	—
13	15 ^{[wild]}	Harmony Celebration	627	56	22	1274	—	—	—	—
14	10	The Woodlands Show	663	75	23	1262	—	—	—	—
15	32	Alba Show	651	47	25	1256	—	—	—	—
16	1	Coastline Show	646	59	3	1258	—	—	—	—
17	15	Liberty Oak	640	82	14	1237	—	—	—	—
18	31	Forth Valley	656	83	5	1220	—	—	—	—
19	13	Pacific Sound	605	64	12	1218	—	—	—	—
20	12	Mission Valley	620	72	13	1205	—	—	—	—
21	22	River City Sound	640	49	4	1205	—	—	—	—
22	19	Upper Chesapeake	616	51	24	1200	—	—	—	—
23	32 ^{[wild]}	Pearls of the Sound	622	49	11	1192	—	—	—	—
24	7	Witchita	604	60	20	1173	—	—	—	—
25	4 ^{[wild]}	Capital City	648	62	29	1170	—	—	—	—
26	17	Greater Cleveland	616	71	32	1162	—	—	—	—
27	34	Perth Harmony	622	55	27	1151	—	—	—	—
28	26	Westcoast Harmony	616	52	6	1146	—	—	—	—
29	35	Wellington City	623	33	31	1128	—	—	—	—
30	2	Great Lakes	636	52	19	1120	—	—	—	—
31	14	Greater Richmond	604	65	9	1097	—	—	—	—
32	5	St. Louis Harmony	608	41	15	1078	—	—	—	—
33	11	Celebrity City	595	53	28	1072	—	—	—	—

== 2015 ==
The 2015 competition was held on 7 and 9 October at the MGM Grand Las Vegas and introduces a new ruleset that increased the scoring value on the performance "package" in the final round, and removed judge's bonus points, reducing the total possible score to 3200. Scottsdale chorus won their fifth international championship medal, further extending their lead as the chorus with the most top-three placements in SAI competitions. This was the first time that Harbor City Music Company or Endeavour Harmony Chorus had qualified for the finals, with the latter also being the first Australian (region 34) chorus to do so.

Las Vegas, Nevada (2015)Official results
Place	Region	Contestant	Regional	Semi-final			Final			Competition video availability: Semi-finals Finals
Place	Region	Contestant	Score	# on stage	Order of appearance	Score	Order of appearance	Score	Grand total	Competition video availability: Semi-finals Finals
1	21	Scottsdale	732	110	8	1518	7	1526	3044	semi-final final
2	16	North Metro	751	132	5	1457	6	1506	2963	semi-final final
3	9	Toast of Tampa Show	751	139	34	1464	2	1475	2939	semi-final final
4	4	Scioto Valley	688	130	20	1459	4	1454	2913	semi-final final
5	26	Lions Gate	684	89	27	1400	5	1464	2864	semi-final final
6	32	Stockholm City Voices ^{[harmony achievement]}	676	41	33	1379	1	1355	2734	semi-final final
7	21 ^{[wild]}	San Diego	708	83	30	1374	3	1323	2697	semi-final final
8	19 ^{[wild]}	Harbor City Music Company	655	72	1	1305	10	1381	2686	semi-final final
9	15	Greater Nassau	710	61	21	1368	8	1304	2672	semi-final final
10	34	Endeavour Harmony	662	68	17	1301	9	1288	2589	semi-final final
11	12	Bay Area Showcase	661	105	10	1277	—	—	—	—
12	19	Pride of Baltimore	655	133	3	1258	—	—	—	—
13	13	Alaska Sound Celebration	629	76	29	1252	—	—	—	—
14	3	Choral-Aires	666	94	6	1251	—	—	—	—
15	5	Kansas City	654	80	23	1250	—	—	—	—
16	31	Lace City	675	85	2	1242	—	—	—	—
17	26 ^{[wild]}	Rhythm of the Rockies	629	64	18	1239	—	—	—	—
18	16 ^{[wild]}	Canadian Showtime	701	87	4	1229	—	—	—	—
19	1	Harmony on the Sound	647	85	31	1218	—	—	—	—
20	31 ^{[wild]}	Phoenix	632	69	28	1210	—	—	—	—
21	12 ^{[wild]}	Sacramento Valley	640	100	26	1209	—	—	—	—
22	14	Greenville in Harmony	653	80	16	1203	—	—	—	—
23	14 ^{[wild]}	Vienna-Falls	616	68	15	1199	—	—	—	—
24	8	Velvet Hills	638	67	32	1180	—	—	—	—
25	25	Talk of Tulsa Show	622	62	22	1178	—	—	—	—
26	2	Shoreline	637	53	25	1173	—	—	—	—
27	35	Greater Auckland	621	49	11	1161	—	—	—	—
28	4 ^{[wild]}	TuneTown	617	60	13	1155	—	—	—	—
29	2 ^{[wild]}	Spirit of Detroit	635	55	7	1135	—	—	—	—
30	10	Houston Horizon	648	74	14	1118	—	—	—	—
31	11	Santa Monica	565	48	9	1079	—	—	—	—
32	17	Grand Rapids	619	58	12	1078	—	—	—	—
33	3 ^{[wild]}	Crosstown Harmony	617	54	24	1076	—	—	—	—
34	6	Fox Valley	615	38	19	1040	—	—	—	—

== 2016 ==
The 2016 competition was held on 17–22 October at the MGM Grand Las Vegas, the first time the competition was held at the same location twice in a row. Rönninge Show Chorus from Stockholm, Sweden won their second ever championship with a score of 3098. This was lower than their record-breaking score of 2013 but due to changes in the scoring system introduced in 2015, the maximum available points were reduced leading to Rönninge's 2016 result having a higher percentage, 96.8%, a new record. This was the first time that The Woodlands Chorus reached the finals.

Las Vegas, Nevada (2016)Official results
Place	Region	Contestant	Regional	Semi-final			Final			Competition video availability: Semi-finals Finals
Place	Region	Contestant	Score	# on stage	Order of appearance	Score	Order of appearance	Score	Grand total	Competition video availability: Semi-finals Finals
1	32	Rönninge Show	744	142	24	1544	5	1554	3098	semi-final final
2	25	Rich-Tone	726	100	12	1491	3	1492	2983	semi-final final
3	21	Harborlites	713	97	1	1384	8	1491	2875	semi-final final
4	8	Skyline	692	135	14	1468	7	1384	2852	semi-final final
5	35	Christchurch City	685	133	10	1385	10	1418	2803	semi-final final
6	13	Pride of Portland	721	120	6	1400	1	1377	2777	semi-final final
7	14	Song of Atlanta	671	84	3	1307	2	1382	2689	semi-final final
8	6	City of Lakes	707	113	5	1359	6	1256	2615	semi-final final
9	10	The Woodlands Show	664	75	31	1311	4	1268	2579	semi-final final
10	16	Buffalo Gateway	672	85	28	1306	9	1237	2543	semi-final final
11	4	Metro Nashville ^{[harmony achievement]}	649	49	17	1297	—	—	—	semi-final —
12	9	Spirit of the Gulf	671	101	27	1281	—	—	—	semi-final —
13	19	Greater Harrisburg	651	104	21	1272	—	—	—	semi-final —
14	15 ^{[wild]}	Harmony Celebration	638	55	29	1249	—	—	—	semi-final —
15	8 ^{[wild]}	Mountain Jubilee	632	72	22	1241	—	—	—	semi-final —
16	25 ^{[wild]}	OK City	668	77	7	1235	—	—	—	semi-final —
17	3	River City Sound	652	44	25	1234	—	—	—	semi-final —
18	15	Liberty Oak	672	83	20	1233	—	—	—	semi-final —
19	31	Heartbeat UK	654	71	2	1214	—	—	—	semi-final —
20	31 ^{[wild]}	Viva Acappella	653	42	18	1207	—	—	—	semi-final —
21	17	Greater Cleveland	641	59	33	1205	—	—	—	semi-final —
22	1	Coastline Show	629	53	32	1195	—	—	—	semi-final —
23	4 ^{[wild]}	Pride of Kentucky	636	66	13	1192	—	—	—	semi-final —
24	26	Westcoast Harmony	650	48	4	1187	—	—	—	semi-final —
25	19 ^{[wild]}	Valley Forge	627	34	8	1166	—	—	—	semi-final —
26	5	River Blenders	620	74	23	1145	—	—	—	semi-final —
27	34	A Cappella West	626	79	30	1142	—	—	—	semi-final —
28	11	Verdugo Hills	600	59	34	1134	—	—	—	semi-final —
29	2	London	610	46	15	1134	—	—	—	semi-final —
30	34 ^{[wild]}	Melbourne	614	57	11	1095	—	—	—	semi-final —
31	3 ^{[wild]}	Midwest Crossroad	623	46	26	1094	—	—	—	semi-final —
32	14 ^{[wild]}	Carolina Style	616	40	19	1056	—	—	—	semi-final —
33	12 ^{[wild]}	Mission Valley	627	61	16	1052	—	—	—	semi-final —
34	12	Song of Sonoma	628	70	9	980	—	—	—	semi-final —

== 2017 ==
The 2017 competition was held on 12 and 14 October. For the third year running, it was held at the MGM Grand Las Vegas.

Las Vegas, Nevada (2017)Official results
Place	Region	Contestant	Regional	Semi-final		Final			Competition video availability: Semi-finals Finals
Place	Region	Contestant	Score	Order of appearance	Score	Order of appearance	Score	Grand total	Competition video availability: Semi-finals Finals
1	16	North Metro	727	23	1455	4	1504	2959	semi-final final
2	26	Lions Gate	703	22	1458	9	1487	2945	semi-final final
3	3	Melodeers	759	18	1513	1	1432	2945	semi-final final
4	9	Toast of Tampa Show	726	8	1427	3	1486	2913	semi-final final
5	4	Scioto Valley	732	5	1434	6	1435	2869	semi-final final
6	19	Harbor City Music Company	706	29	1418	10	1425	2843	semi-final final
7	15	Greater Nassau	687	34	1336	5	1340	2676	semi-final final
8	3 ^{[wild]}	Choral-Aires	666	32	1324	2	1297	2621	semi-final final
9	32	Stockholm City Voices ^{[harmony achievement]}	669	30	1324	8	1270	2594	semi-final final
10	12	Bay Area Showcase	667	33	1299	7	1250	2549	semi-final final
11	31	Forth Valley	694	9	1281	—	—	—	semi-final —
12	25	Talk of Tulsa Show	635	27	1250	—	—	—	semi-final —
13	21	San Diego	670	10	1239	—	—	—	semi-final —
14	12 ^{[wild]}	Sacramento Valley	613	14	1236	—	—	—	semi-final —
15	13 ^{[wild]}	a cappella joy	630	16	1232	—	—	—	semi-final —
16	16 ^{[wild]}	Canadian Showtime	657	4	1211	—	—	—	semi-final —
17	26 ^{[wild]}	Rhythm of the Rockies	636	21	1193	—	—	—	semi-final —
18	25 ^{[wild]}	Springfield Metro	617	20	1180	—	—	—	semi-final —
19	35	Waikato Rivertones	659	19	1179	—	—	—	semi-final —
20	10	Houston Horizon	599	31	1175	—	—	—	semi-final —
21	11	Santa Monica	616	15	1175	—	—	—	semi-final —
22	13	Alaska Sound Celebration	634	26	1166	—	—	—	semi-final —
23	1	Harmony on the Sound	642	28	1165	—	—	—	semi-final —
24	14	Vienna-Falls	634	1	1151	—	—	—	semi-final —
25	4 ^{[wild]}	TuneTown Show	649	25	1148	—	—	—	semi-final —
26	5	Kansas City	608	17	1146	—	—	—	semi-final —
27	34	Perth Harmony	613	13	1129	—	—	—	semi-final —
28	2	Shoreline Sound	645	11	1120	—	—	—	semi-final —
29	8	High Country	536	24	1102	—	—	—	semi-final —
30	15 ^{[wild]}	Spirit of Syracuse	623	6	1092	—	—	—	semi-final —
31	17	Grand Rapids	624	3^{[a]}	1062	—	—	—	semi-final —
32	17 ^{[wild]}	Sounds of Pittsburgh	612	12	1034	—	—	—	semi-final —
33	6	Fox Valley	573	7	999	—	—	—	semi-final —

^{a} Wellington City qualified and were to compete in position number 2 but withdrew from the competition before it began. Therefore, Grand Rapids competed 2nd but are officially listed as contestant number 3.

== 2018 ==
The 2018 competition semifinal was held on October 18, and the final on October 20, at The Dome at America's Center in St. Louis, Missouri. Scottsdale from region 21 won their first consecutive championship, placing them as outright second most successful chorus ever ahead of Rich-Tone who came third. Second was Harborlites, the wildcard from region 21, who had been leading after the semifinal. Metro Nashville won the "Harmony Achievement" award for the fourth consecutive time. It was the first time that Swedish competitor Pearls of the Sound had qualified for the finals, the only first-timer in the top ten.

St. Louis, Missouri (2018)[semifinal & final Official results]
Place	Region	Contestant	Regional	Semi-final		Final			Competition video availability: Semi-finals Finals
Place	Region	Contestant	Score	Order of appearance	Score	Order of appearance	Score	Grand total	Competition video availability: Semi-finals Finals
1	21	Scottsdale	744	23	1488	4	1494	2982	semi-final final
2	21 ^{[wild]}	Harborlites	731	23	1507	1	1470	2977	semi-final final
3	25	Rich-Tone	673	24	1478	9	1481	2959	semi-final final
4	8	Skyline	724	26	1406	7	1395	2801	semi-final final
5	32	Pearls of the Sound	634	6	1333	8	1364	2697	semi-final final
6	14	Song of Atlanta	686	2	1373	4	1314	2687	semi-final final
7	13	Pride of Portland	710	12	1348	2	1338	2686	semi-final final
8	6	City of Lakes	710	34	1334	3	1271	2605	semi-final final
9	4	Metro Nashville ^{[harmony achievement]}	647	4	1278	5	1326	2604	semi-final final
10	16	Buffalo Gateway	676	17	1280	10	1248	2528	semi-final final
11	2	Motor City Blend	677	16	1259	—	—	—	semi-final —
12	15	Liberty Oak	663	25	1249	—	—	—	semi-final —
13	26	Westcoast Harmony	643	22	1246	—	—	—	semi-final —
14	25 ^{[wild]}	O.K. City	649	3	1245	—	—	—	semi-final —
15	10	The Woodlands Show	687	19	1245	—	—	—	semi-final —
16	31	Lace City	673	11	1244	—	—	—	semi-final —
17	34	Endeavour Harmony	655	29	1238	—	—	—	semi-final —
18	15 ^{[wild]}	Harmony Celebration	648	31	1233	—	—	—	semi-final —
19	9	Spirit of the Gulf	683	32	1225	—	—	—	semi-final —
20	32 ^{[wild]}	Alba Show	626	9	1216	—	—	—	semi-final —
21	4 ^{[wild]}	Pride of Kentucky	642	13	1208	—	—	—	semi-final —
22	19	Valley Forge	638	1	1177	—	—	—	semi-final —
23	5	River Blenders	640	7	1176	—	—	—	semi-final —
24	14 ^{[wild]}	Vocal Matrix	630	28	1167	—	—	—	semi-final —
25	1	Coastline Show	607	14	1157	—	—	—	semi-final —
26	11	Carpe Diem	608	18	1143	—	—	—	semi-final —
27	31 ^{[wild]}	Phoenix	643	8	1139	—	—	—	semi-final —
28	3	River City Sound	636	30	1118	—	—	—	semi-final —
29	10 ^{[wild]}	Alamo Metro	617	21	1112	—	—	—	semi-final —
30	12	Pacific Empire	606	27	1111	—	—	—	semi-final —
31	16 ^{[wild]}	Circle of Harmony	616	15	1087	—	—	—	semi-final —
32	2 ^{[wild]}	London	620	33	1083	—	—	—	semi-final —
33	17	Greater Harmony	597	10	1080	—	—	—	semi-final —
34	35	Faultline	614	20	1077	—	—	—	semi-final —

== 2019 ==
The 2019 competition took place in September at the Smoothie King Center, New Orleans. The order of appearance of the qualified contestants, based on their 2018 regional competition scores, was published.
