= Pride of Baltimore Chorus =

All-female a cappella chorus in Maryland

- Origin: Baltimore, Maryland, US
- Genres: a cappella
- Years active: 1993–2021
- Website: www.prideofbaltimorechorus.com

The Pride of Baltimore Chorus was an all-female, a cappella chorus based in metropolitan Baltimore, Maryland. Founded in the early 1990s, the chorus once boasted over 110 members hailing from 5 different states: Maryland, Virginia, New Jersey, Pennsylvania, and Delaware. They were a chapter of Sweet Adelines International, the world's largest women's singing organization.

== History ==
The Pride of Baltimore chorus ("POB") was chartered to provide a forum for women from all walks of life who wished to sing and perform at the highest possible level. A focus on outstanding singing, above all else, had been a hallmark of the chorus since its inception.

POB competed in their first regional competition in the Spring of 1994 with only twenty women on stage. By 1996 they had 38 singers and placed third in their Regional competition. They also took first place in the first ever Sweet Adelines International Small Chorus Festival, held in St. Louis, Missouri.

From this victory, they returned to Regional competition in the spring of 1997 with 47 singers, moving up to second place. In the spring of 1998, POB won their first Regional competition, with 55 women on stage. This qualified them for their first international contest, held in Atlanta, Georgia in the fall of 1999. Their goal in Atlanta was to win a spot among the top ten choruses in the world. With 68 women on stage, they succeeded in meeting their goal. They were the smallest chorus in the top ten and exceeded everyone's expectations by winning sixth place.

After again winning Regionals in 2000, they traveled to Portland, Oregon in October 2001 for their second international chorus contest. Hoping to break into the top five, they placed third, winning a bronze medal in the contest with 77 women on stage.

Their third International contest came in the fall of 2003, in Phoenix, Arizona. With 99 women on stage, they upset the 3-time international champion The Rich-Tone Chorus to take a silver medal. Their next international competition was in Detroit, Michigan in the fall of 2005, where they repeated as silver medalists and placed first in the semifinal round with 115 women on stage.

After the Detroit International, the chorus's Master Director Janet Ashford was diagnosed with pancreatic cancer and needed to undergo treatment as soon as possible. This meant that the chorus would be without a director for an unspecified period of time. As the 2007 contest drew near, it became apparent that Ashford would be unable to travel to the International contest in Calgary, Alberta, and another director would need to fill the rather large shoes she left. Jim Arns, director of the four-time international champion Melodeers Chorus willingly stepped in and took 109 women to the Calgary contest. There they won a silver medal, their third silver medal in international competition.

Though Ashford won some battles against her illness, the cancer returned and she died on 9 January 2009. This was a difficult time for the chorus but they pulled together, determined to continue Janet Ashford's legacy.

The chorus began a search for a new director in April 2009. In July 2009, the Pride of Baltimore announced that its new director was Joe Cerutti, who also directs the Alexandria Harmonizers chorus of the Barbershop Harmony Society. Under his tutelage, the chorus continued to compete at the international level, placing 12th in 2011, 16th in 2013, and 12th in 2015. Cerutti stepped down in 2017, and the chorus selected Lynda Keever as their new music director. Keever stepped down in 2018 and was replaced by their final director, Tyler Horton.

== Subsequent activities ==
After Ashford's untimely death, the Pride of Baltimore Chorus continued performing in shows and after sitting out for a time, returned to the competition stage, competing in the Sweet Adelines International Competition in Houston, Texas on October 20, 2011, placing 12th. This was the first time in chapter history the chorus did not qualify for the chorus finals round at an international competition.

On November 6, 2013, the chorus competed in the Sweet Adelines International chorus semifinals once again, in Honolulu, Hawaii, and placed 16th.

On October 8, 2015, the chorus once again competed in the Sweet Adelines International chorus semifinals, in Las Vegas, NV and placed 12th.

The chorus performed throughout the mid-Atlantic region, presenting a variety of music: Broadway show tunes, classical ballads, and contemporary, popular songs — all arranged in the "barbershop style".

After several years of declining membership, compounded by the COVID-19 pandemic, the Pride of Baltimore Chorus dissolved its charter in 2021, turning the chapter's remaining funds into a scholarship fund for young singers.

== Bibliography ==
- "The Pitch Pipe," Sweet Adelines International, 2000–2009
- "The Sound Source," Pride of Baltimore Chorus, 1993–2009
