= Zing =

Zing or ZING may refer to:

== Arts and entertainment ==
- Zing (quartet), an American barbershop quartet
- Zing (TV channel), an Indian music TV channel
- Zing, a term for love at first sight in the Hotel Transylvania film series

== Computing ==
- Zing (model-checker), a Microsoft model checking tool
- Zing JVM, a Java virtual machine by Azul Systems
- Zing.vn, the portal of VinaGame company
- Z39.50 International: Next Generation (ZING), modernization efforts of the Z39.50 protocol

== People ==
- Steve Zing (born 1964), American drummer
- Zing-Yang Kuo (1898–1970), Chinese experimental and physiological psychologist
- Zing Tsjeng (born 1988), Singaporean writer based in London

== Other uses ==
- Zing, Taraba State, a local government area in Nigeria
- Zing Technologies, a company that makes collaborative team learning and meeting systems
- Pop's Props Zing, an ultralight aircraft
- Zing, a former business, merged into Micromania-Zing, a French videogaming retail company

== See also ==
- The Legendary Zing Album, a 1972 album by the Trammps
- "Zing a Little Zong", a popular song from the 1952 movie Just for You
- Zing It, an audio game
- Cherry Zing, a yogurt flavour
- Lemon Lime Zing, a Crayola crayon color
