= Metro Nashville Chorus =

American all-female a cappella chorus

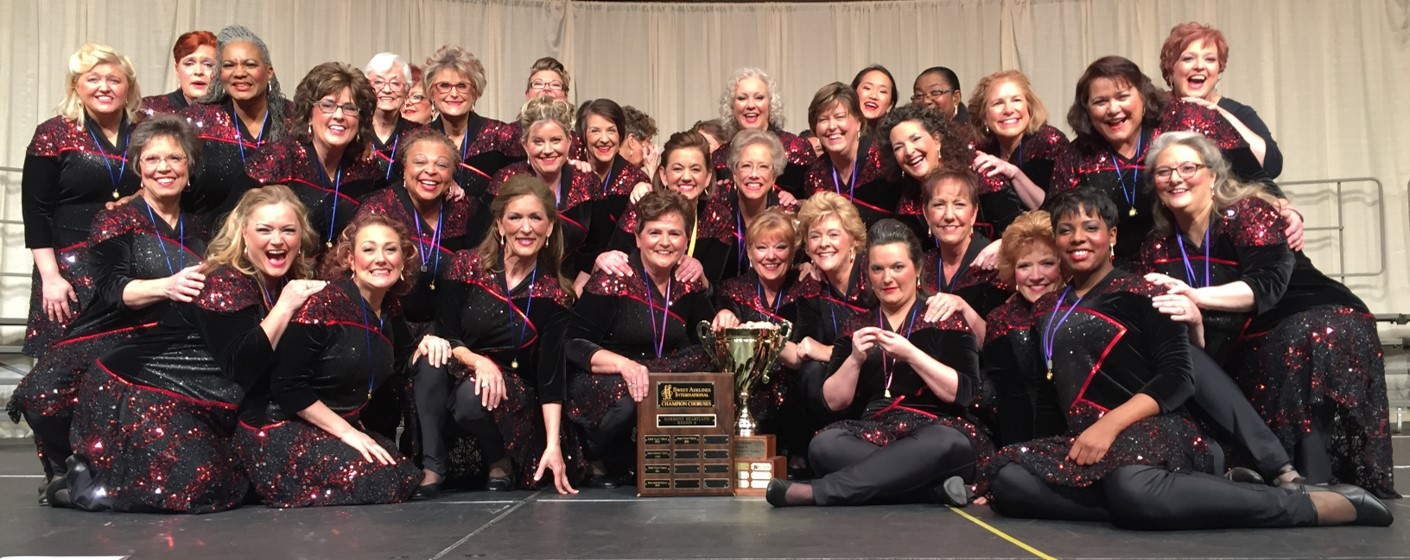
- Metro Nashville Chorus, 2017

Background information
- Origin: Nashville, Tennessee
- Genres: Barbershop music
- Years active: 1971–present
- Website: Official site

Metro Nashville Chorus is a women's a cappella chorus located in Nashville, Tennessee in the United States. The group was founded in 1971 and currently has approximately 50 members. The chorus is led by Master Director Kim Wonders, a chorus member since 1979 and director since 1988.

Metro Nashville Chorus is a chapter of the Sweet Adelines International worldwide non-profit organization, which includes over 20,000 women who advance the barbershop harmony musical art form through education and performance.

== Competition ==
There are over 500 Sweet Adeline choruses around the world, ranging in size from 15 to 150. Metro Nashville currently competes in Division AA, mid-size, which includes choruses from 31 to 60 voices. In 2006, Metro Nashville competed as a Division A (or small) chorus and earned 1st place at Harmony Classic, the international competition for Division A choruses.

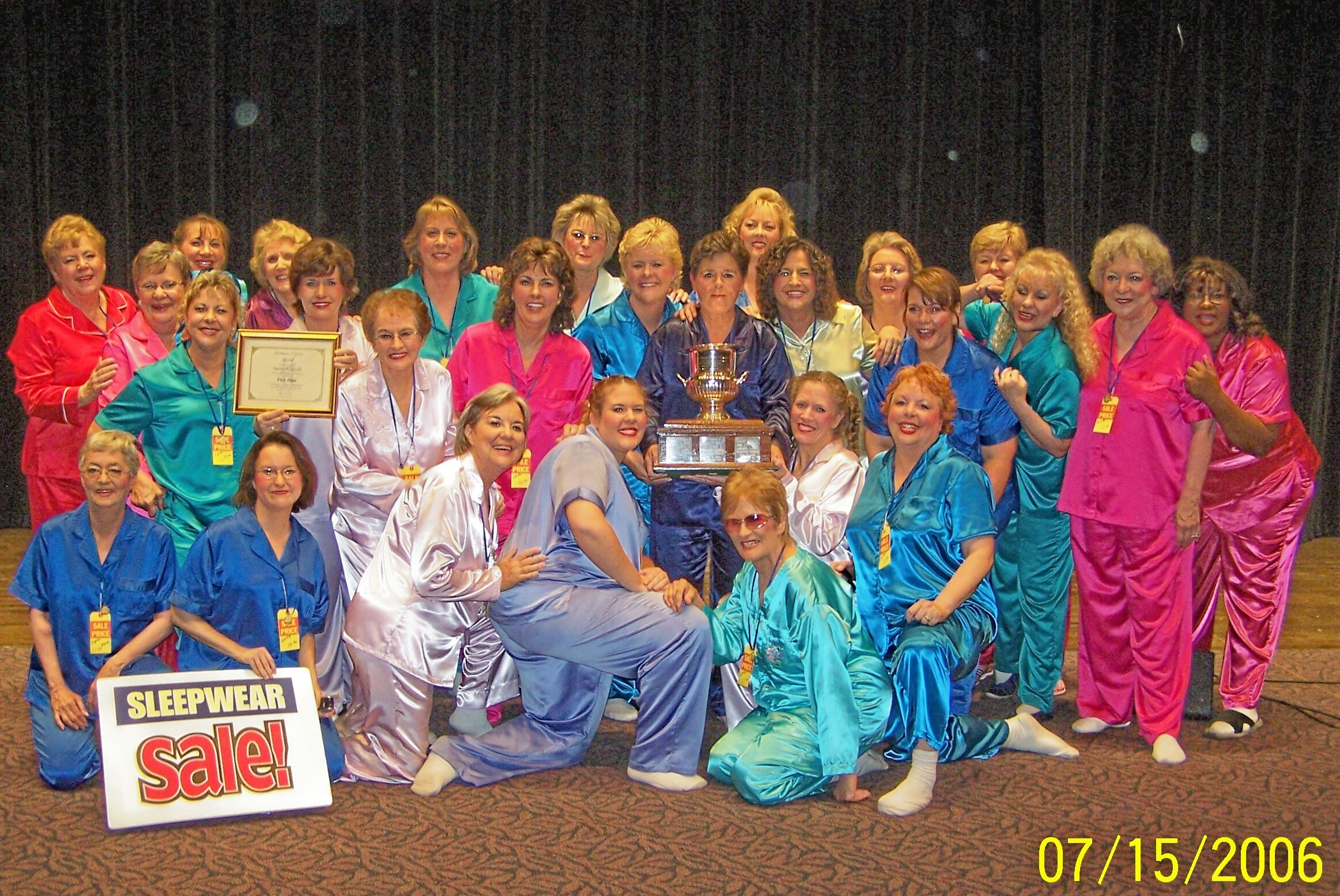
2006 Small Chorus Champions

In 2008, the chorus was named Sweet Adelines 2008 International Mid-Size Chorus Champions. They were the first chorus to win gold in both size divisions.

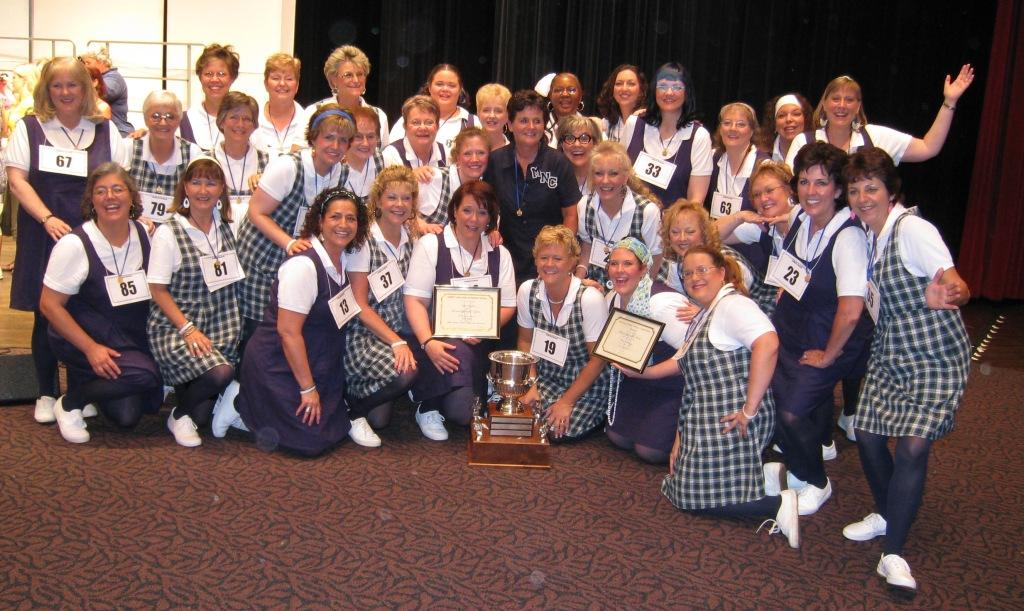
2008 Mid-Size Chorus Champions

MNC earned a Wildcard spot in the 2009 Sweet Adelines International Competition which was held in Nashville, Tennessee in October 2009. MNC placed 22nd (of 32) against top choruses 2–3 times its size.

In 2011, MNC earned gold as the 2012 Mid-Size chorus champions – the first chorus to receive three international gold medals at the Sweet Adelines International Harmony Classic.

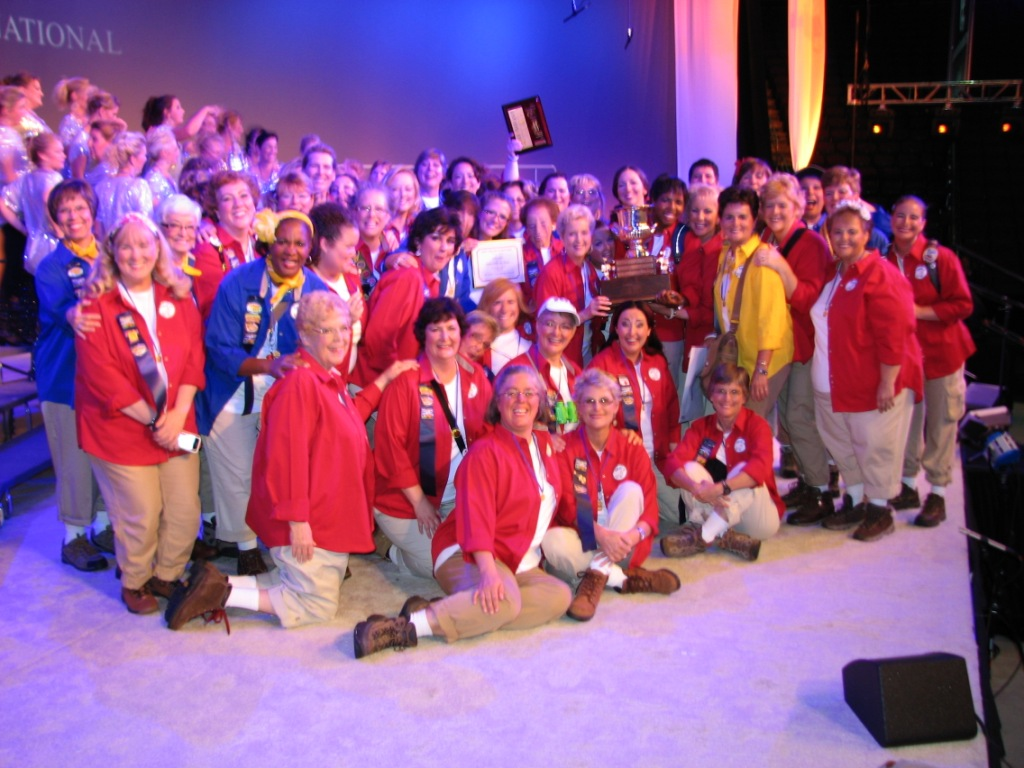
2012 Mid-Size Chorus Champions

In November 2012, MNC competed in Denver, Colorado as a wildcard in the large chorus competition and came in 12th, earning the 2013 Harmony Achievement Award, which recognizes the highest scoring smaller chorus (<80% average size for the contest) in an International contest.

In April 2013, MNC became Regional Champions for the first time since 1989. They competed at the International Contest in Baltimore, MD in October 2014 – earning the Harmony Achievement Award for the second time and earning a 7th place overall medal.

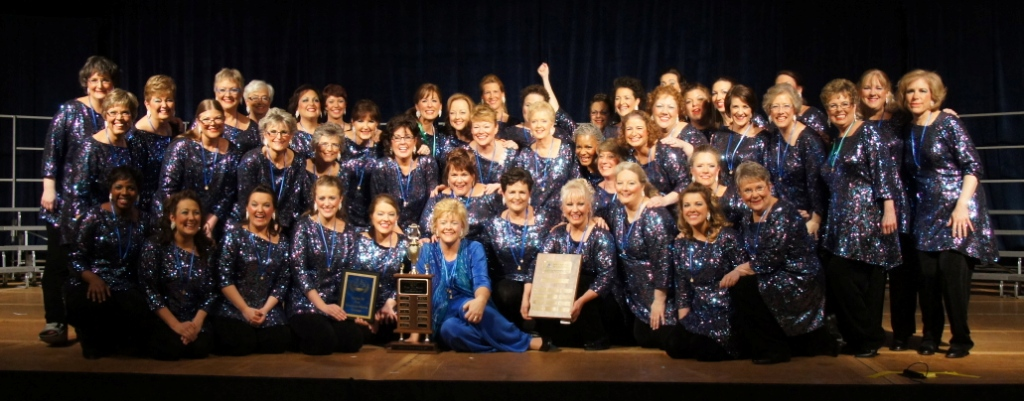
2013 Region 23 Chorus Champions

In October 2016, MNC competed at the International Chorus Contest in Las Vegas, NV in October 2016, placing 11th and acting as mic testers for the Chorus Finals (top 10) choruses. They earned the Harmony Achievement Award, the only chorus to have won the award three times.

MNC will compete in the International Chorus Contest in St. Louis, Missouri in October 2018.

== Performance ==
Metro Nashville Chorus' members can be seen throughout the community performing at local events, fairs, hospitals, churches, festivals, and shows.

Since 2011, the chorus has conducted an annual barbershop festival for girls age 14–25. Called YWISH – Young Women in Song & Harmony – the festival introduces the girls to the barbershop art form, and the YWISH chorus joins MNC for a performance.

== Membership ==
Metro Nashville Chorus members range in age from 18 to 75. Most of the chorus members live in the Nashville area, but some members travel from Memphis, Knoxville, St Louis, Missouri, and Birmingham, Alabama.
