= MAXX Factor =

Women's barbershop quartet

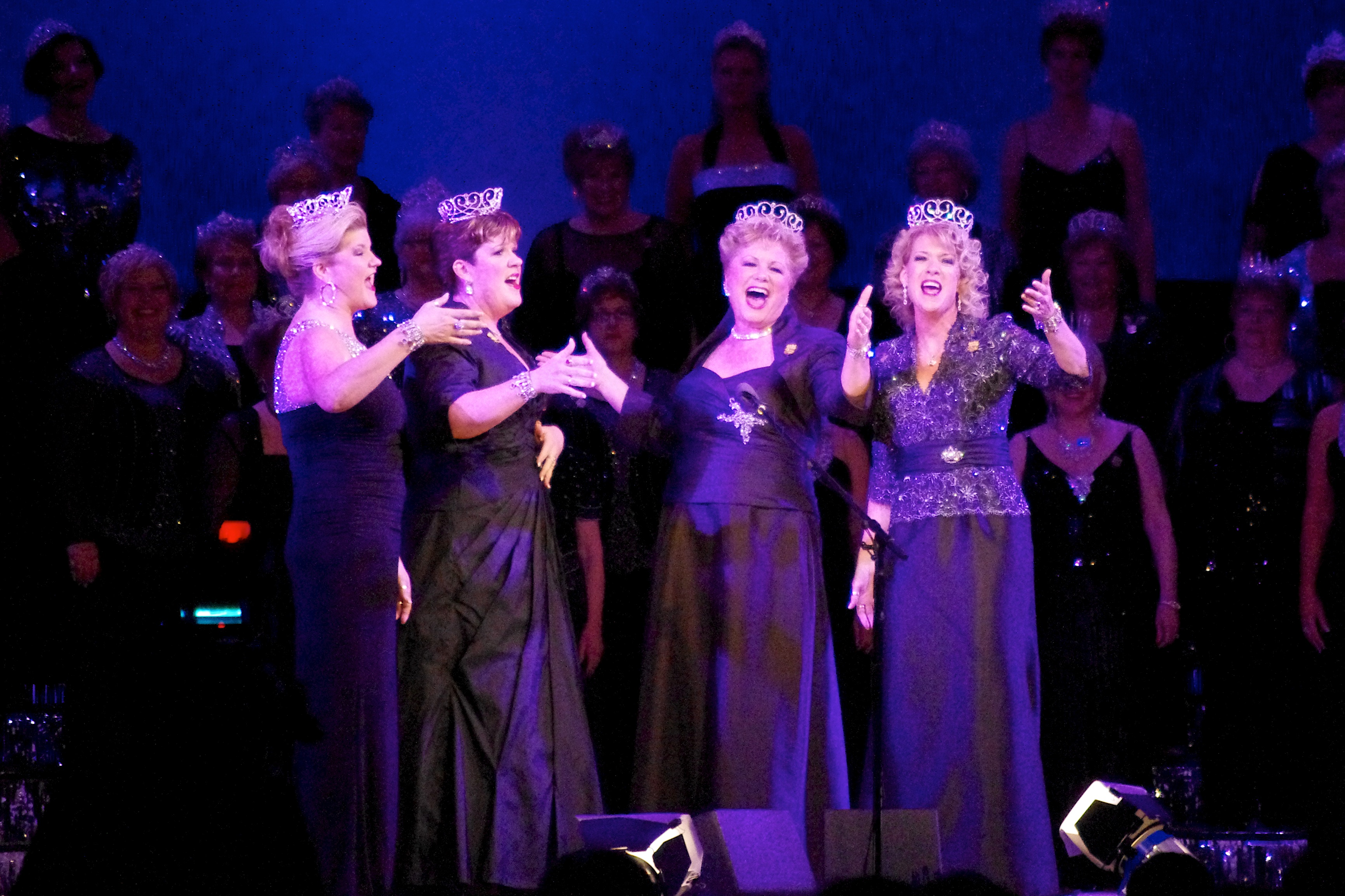
- performing as 2011 reigning "Queens of Harmony" at their induction into "The Coronet Club"

Background information
- Origin: Baltimore, Maryland, USA
- Genres: Barbershop
- Years active: 2007–present
- Members: Molly Dalton Plummer – tenor Leslie Wodday Shoenhard – lead Kim Gray – baritone Valerie Hadfield-Rasnake – bass
- Past members: Dawn Adams (2012–2018) replaced original baritone Kim Gray in 2012. Gray had commitments that made her unavailable to continue performing with the quartet. Gray returned to the quartet in 2018.
- Website: maxxfactorquartet.com

MAXX Factor is the barbershop quartet that won the Sweet Adelines International Quartet Championship for 2011 on October 22, 2010, in Seattle, Washington. The quartet competed with seven other a cappella groups in the first season of The Sing-Off reality television show in December 2009, before being eliminated in the third of four episodes. MAXX Factor won the 2009 Mid-Atlantic Harmony Sweepstakes qualifying them to compete in the 2009 National Harmony Sweepstakes, which they won. All MAXX Factor members sing with The Coronet Club in their annual show at Sweet Adelines International Convention.

== Discography ==
- MAXX Sixx Pack (CD; 2009)
- MAXX Factor (CD; 2011)
- MAXX OUT (CD; 2015)

Preceded by Zing!	SAI Quartet Champions; 2011	Succeeded by Martini
