= Salt (quartet) =

Women's barbershop quartet

SALT
- Origin: Huddinge, Sweden
- Genres: Barbershop
- Years active: 2000–12
- Members: Anna Öhman – tenor Annika Andersson – lead Karin Sjöblom – baritone Susanna Berndts – bass
- Past members: Anna-Stina Gerdin – baritone through 2007
- Website: www.saltonstage.se

SALT is a Swedish barbershop quartet that won the Sweet Adelines International competition Quartet Championship for 2007 in Las Vegas, Nevada in October 2006. Sweet Adelines, "one of the world's largest singing organizations for women", has members over five continents who belong to more than 1200 quartets. SALT's November 2008 feature performance in Anaheim, California was noted by the Vasa Order of America. At the time of winning the Sweet Adelines competition, SALT included tenor Anna Öhman, lead Annika Andersson; baritone Anna-Stina Gerdin, and bass Susanna Berndts. The quartet announced its retirement on Facebook in June 2012 "after singing together for 13 years".

== Discography ==
- SALT II (CD; 2010)
- SALT (CD)
- Let's Warm Up! (instructional CD)

Preceded by SPOTLIGHT	SAI Quartet Champions; 2007	Succeeded by Four Bettys
