= Moxie Ladies =

Champion women's barbershop quartet

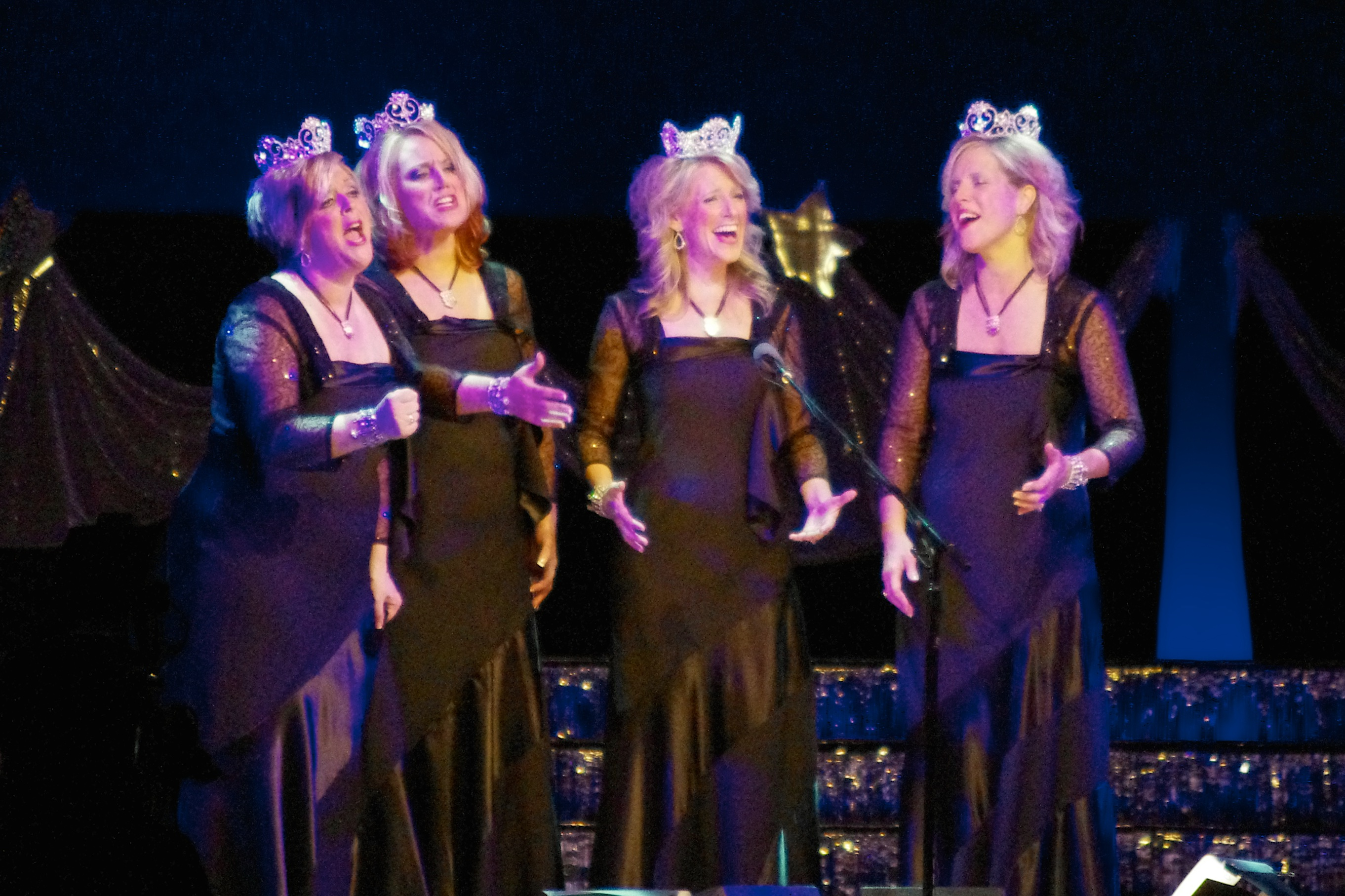
- Performing at the 2011 "coronet club" show

Background information
- Origin: Columbus, Ohio, USA
- Genres: Barbershop
- Years active: 2005–present
- Members: Stacey St. John – tenor Jennifer Edwards – lead Amy Leacock – baritone Gretchen Holloway – bass
- Website: www.harmonize.com/moxieladies/

Moxie Ladies is the barbershop quartet that won the Sweet Adelines International Quartet Championship for 2009 on November 7, 2008, in Honolulu, Hawaii. SAI, "one of the world's largest singing organizations for women", has members over five continents who belong to more than 1,200 quartets.

== Discography ==
- Moxie Ladies (CD; 2012)

Preceded by Four Bettys	SAI Quartet Champions; 2009	Succeeded by Zing!
