= Four Bettys =

Champion women's barbershop quartet

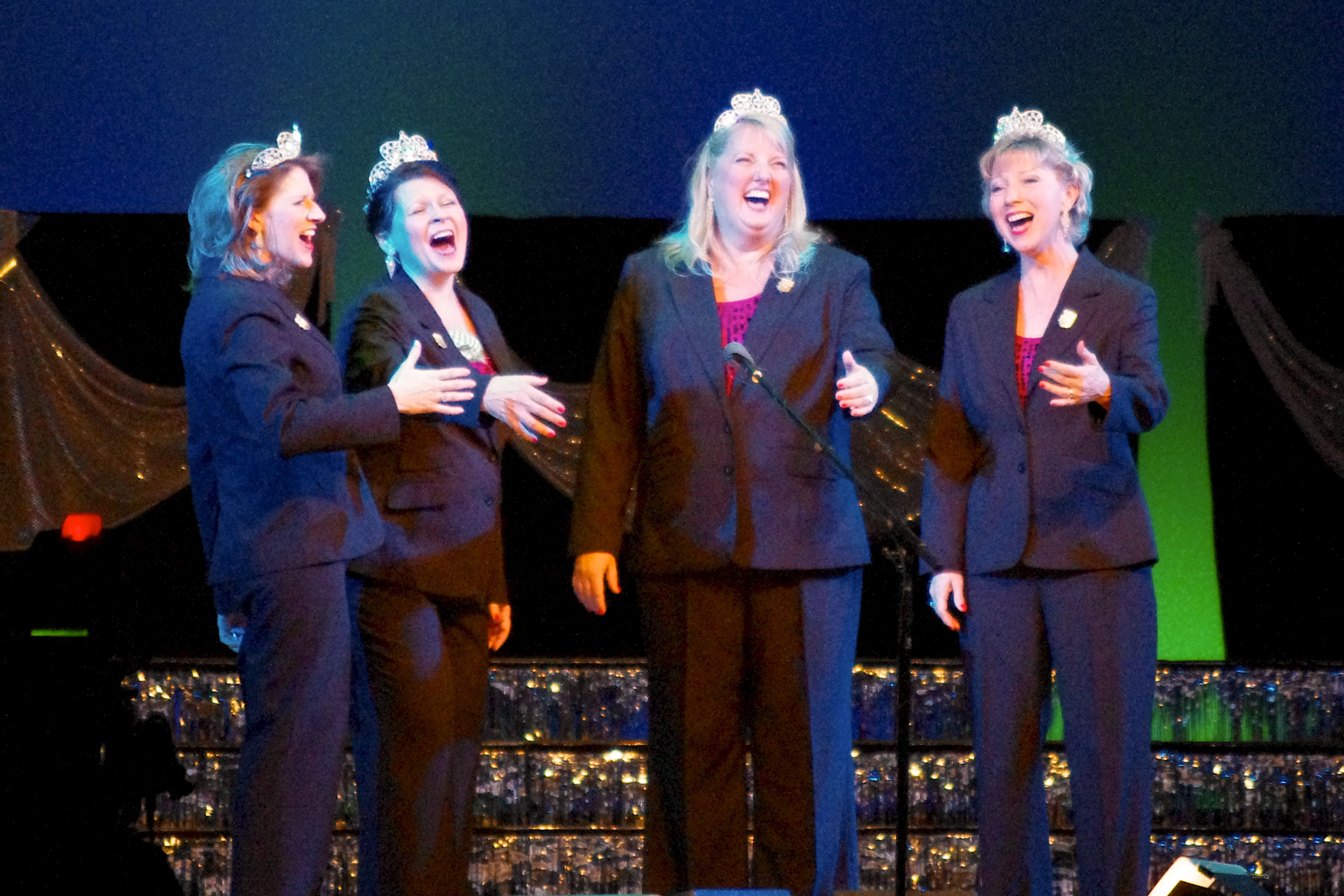
- Performing at the 2011 "coronet club" show

Background information
- Origin: Elmhurst, Illinois, U.S.
- Genres: Barbershop
- Members: Joan Boutilier; Lynda Mears-Keever; Heather Mears-Keever; Cori Albrecht
- Website: www.fourbettys.com

Four Bettys is the barbershop quartet that won the Sweet Adelines International Quartet Championship for 2008 in October 2007, in Calgary, Alberta, Canada. SAI, "one of the world's largest singing organizations for women", has members over five continents who belong to more than 1200 quartets. The Illinois Arts Council has included Four Bettys in its ArtsTour roster and notes "their numerous appearances singing the National Anthem at Wrigley Field for Cubs games".

== Discography ==
- 4B (CD; 2006)
- Good Queen Fun (CD; 2008)
- Betty Or Not Here We Come (CD; 2010)
- Betty Holidays (CD; 2012)

Preceded by SALT	SAI Quartet Champions; 2008	Succeeded by Moxie Ladies
