= Zing (quartet) =

Women's barbershop quartet

Zing!
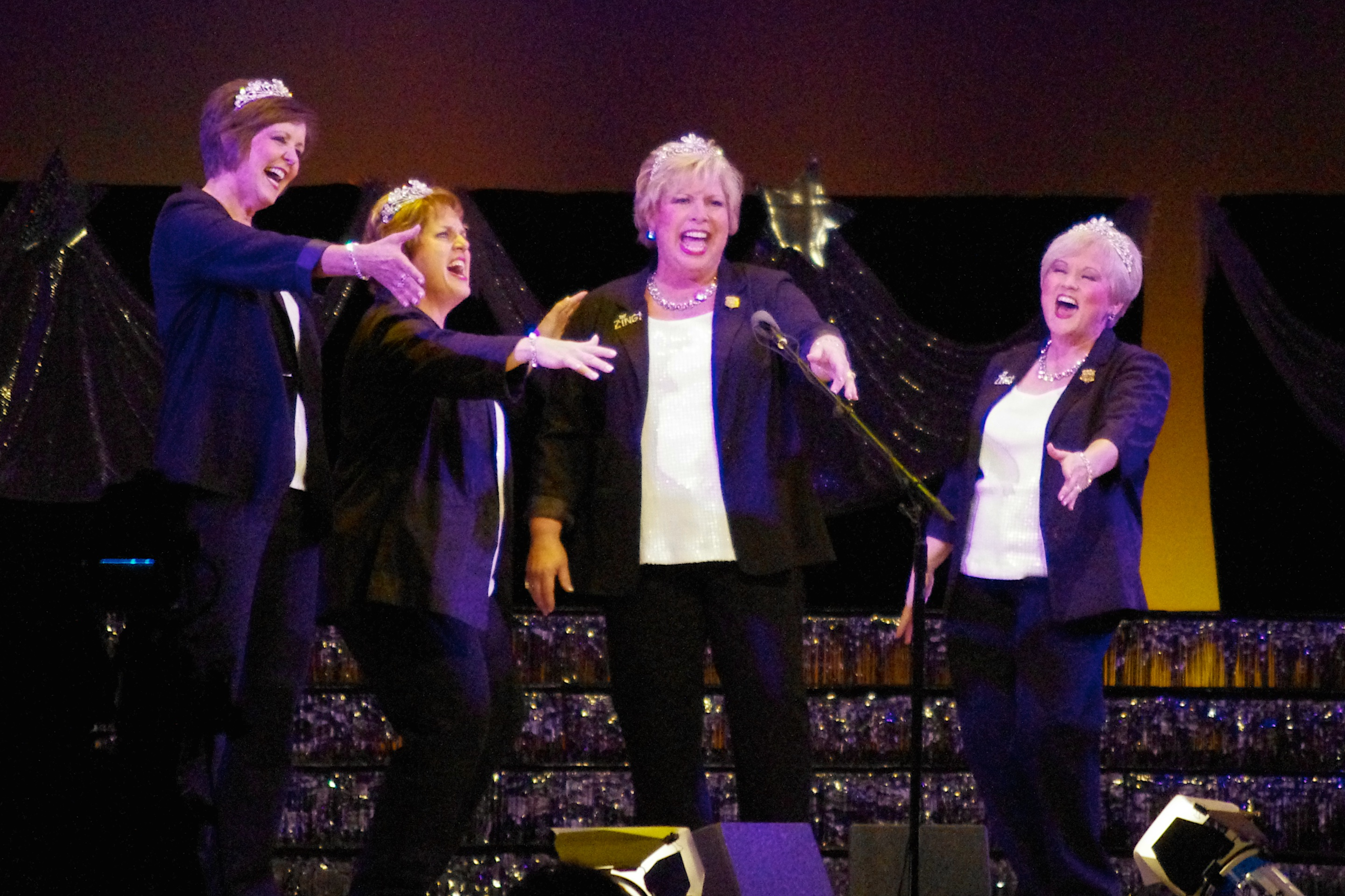
- Performing at the 2011 "coronet club" show

Background information
- Origin: Olathe, Kansas, USA
- Genres: Barbershop
- Years active: 2001–13
- Members: Michelle Hunget – tenor Susan Ives – lead Mary Rhea – baritone Melynnie Williams – bass
- Website: zing-quartet.com

Zing! is an American barbershop quartet, which won the Sweet Adelines International Quartet Championship for 2010 in October 2009 in Nashville, Tennessee. Sweet Adelines, "one of the world's largest singing organizations for women", has members over five continents who belong to more than 1200 quartets. The State Library of Kansas, representing the quartet's home state, lists Zing! among its "Musicians of Note". Zing! announced its retirement in November 2012.

== Discography ==
- Zing! (CD; 2007)
- The Best Seat in the House (CD; 2010)

| Preceded by Moxie Ladies | SAI Quartet Champions; 2010 | Succeeded by MAXX Factor |
