= Rönninge Show Chorus =

Swedish female a cappella chorus

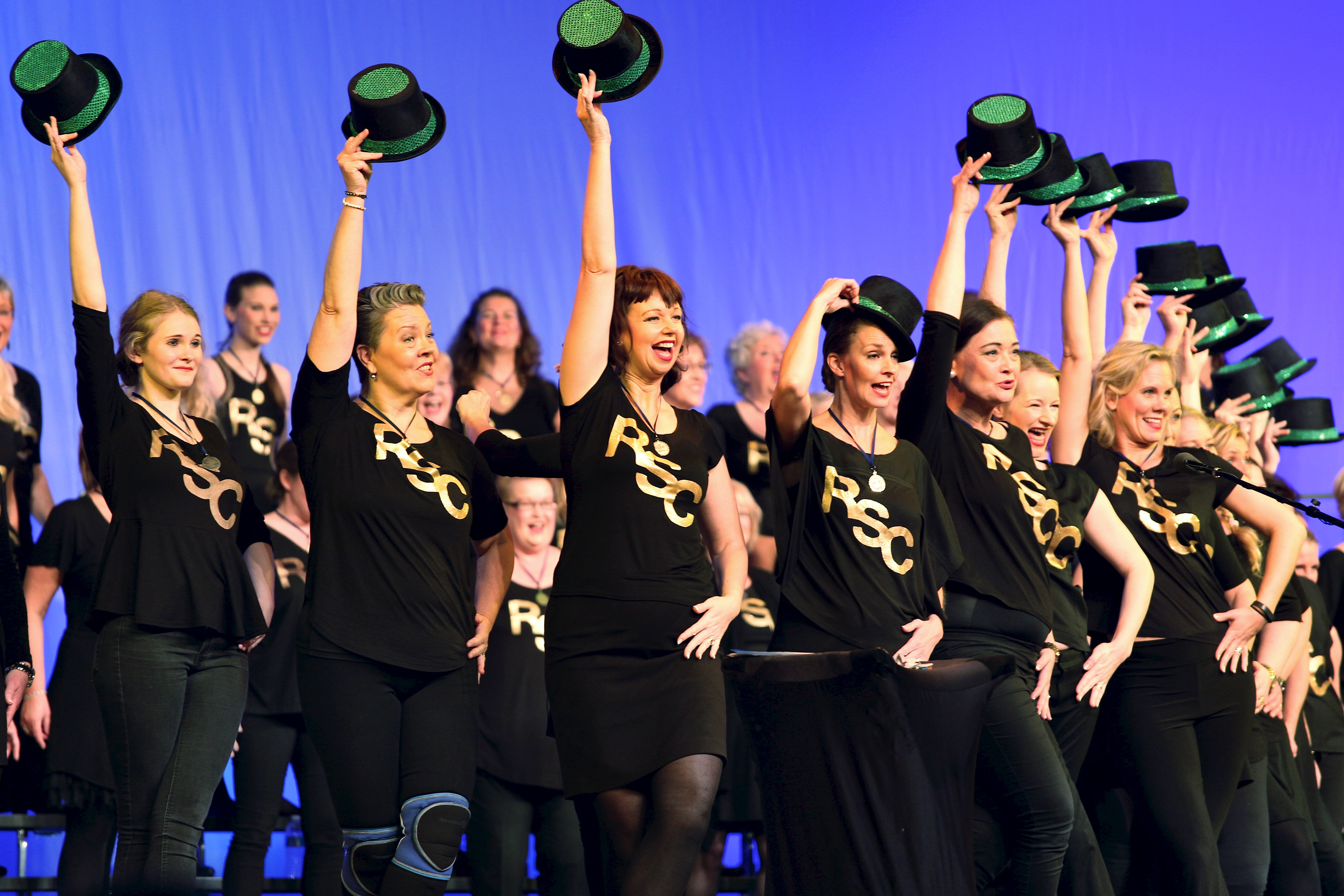
- RSC performing in 2014 as reigning international champions

Background information
- Origin: Rönninge, Salem Municipality, Sweden
- Genres: a cappella
- Years active: 1983–present
- Website: ronningeshow.com

The Rönninge Show Chorus is an all-female, a cappella chorus based in Rönninge, Sweden.

== History ==
Founded in 1983, the Rönninge Show Chorus is one of the largest and most successful a cappella choruses in Scandinavia. Singing music primarily in the barbershop style, they are affiliated with Sweet Adelines International (SAI), the world's largest all-female singing organization with over 25,000 members worldwide. Rönninge have represented Sweden in SAI's international chorus competition for over 20 years, never placing lower than 6th in the world. They are the 2014 SAI international gold medal chorus, having achieved that honor at the 2013 contest in Honolulu, HI, with a score of 3138 out of a possible 3280. This was the highest ever score and also the first time a non-North American chorus had won the competition.

== Contest placement ==
- 5th place: 1989 International Miami Beach, FL
- 6th place: 1992 International Baltimore, MD
- 2nd place: 1995 International New Orleans, LA
- 1st place: 1996 European Championships Cardiff, Wales
- 1st place: 1998 European Championships Stockholm, Sweden
- 4th place: 1998 International Nashville, TN
- 4th place: 2001 International Portland, OR
- 2nd place: 2003 European Championships Veldhoven, Netherlands
- 4th place: 2004 International Indianapolis, IN
- 5th place: 2008 International Honolulu, HI
- 2nd place: 2011 International Houston, TX
- 1st place: 2013 International Honolulu, HI
- 1st place: 2016 International Las Vegas, NV
- 1st place: 2019 International New Orleans, LA

== Directors ==
Rönninge Show Chorus is directed by Britt-Helene Bonnedahl and Anna Alvring.

Britt-Helene Bonnedahl has been involved in barbershop singing since 1976 and has been part of the Rönninge Show Chorus since its inception. Trained in many areas of vocal music, Britt-Helene travels the world as a voice teacher, clinician and coach of a cappella groups. She has been a member of the international faculty for Sweet Adelines International for many years and her musical influence is felt throughout the world of barbershop music.

Anna Alvring is a musically trained primary school head master as well as a music and math teacher with a long-time love for barbershop. Before joining Rönninge Show Chorus, Anna was the director of Stockholm City Chorus.
