= Zing Technologies =

- Website: http://www.anyzing.com/

Zing Technologies is company that marketed a proprietary collaborative software system for meeting and learning. There are two versions of their software, Anyzing and Zingthing.

== See also ==
- Computer-supported collaboration
- Online learning
