= Lions Gate Chorus =

Cappella chorus

- Years active: 64
- Website: https://lionsgatechorus.ca/

Lions Gate Chorus is an a cappella choir of Sweet Adelines International, based in the Greater Vancouver metropolitan area of British Columbia, Canada. The chorus competes in Sweet Adelines International Region 26, and are the 2024 International Champions of Sweet Adelines International.

Founded in 1954, the group's name "Lions Gate" refers to the Lions, a pair of mountain peaks visible to the North of Vancouver. The famous Lions' Gate Bridge crosses the first narrows of Burrard Inlet towards the Lions.

Under the direction of Sandy Robinson Marron, Lions Gate Chorus has achieved many regional gold medals. At Nashville, Tennessee in 1998, the chorus earned the International Harmony Achievement Award, which is given to the highest scoring small chorus at the International contest. In 2003, the chorus traveled to Phoenix, Arizona and achieved the highest ranking for a western Canadian chorus, 11th Place. In 2005, the Lions Gate Chorus placed 12th at the Sweet Adelines International Convention in Detroit, Michigan. In 2007, the chorus earned a third place Bronze medal in Calgary. In October 2009, Lions Gate Chorus competed in Nashville, and placed 2nd in the chorus finals, becoming the 2010 Sweet Adelines International Silver Medalists. In 2013, Lions Gate placed 5th at the competition in Honolulu, Hawaii. 2015 in Las Vegas saw another 5th place finish for Lions Gate Chorus. In 2017, Lions Gate Chorus competed in Las Vegas and again took second place making them the 2018 Sweet Adelines International Silver Medalists and the audience choice for Most Entertaining! 2019 brought another silver medal and audience choice for most entertaining, this time in New Orleans.

On November 4th 2023, at the 75th Annual Sweet Adelines International Convention and Competition in Louisville, Kentucky, Lions Gate Chorus secured the title of International Champions with record-breaking scores. This is the first time in the chorus’ long history to win the coveted international gold medal. Not only did Lions Gate win the contest, but they were also the first chorus in Sweet Adelines history to receive a perfect score in any category from the panel of judges. Moments before the announcement of their championship title, Lions Gate was also named the audience's choice for “Most Entertaining Chorus” of the competition — an award they won in 2009, 2017, and 2019.

The chorus' numbers have varied over the years. Steady growth in the late 1990s has continued, with over 100 singers in most performances. Lions Gate Chorus exists to enrich the lives of singers who are comfortable in an environment that centres on the experiences of women.

In 2022, Lions Gate Chorus performed on Canada's got Talent
