= Melodeers Chorus =

Women's barbershop chorus

- Origin: Deerfield, Illinois, USA
- Genres: a cappella
- Years active: 1960–present
- Website: www.melodeers.org

The Melodeers are an all-female, a cappella barbershop harmony chorus based in the metropolitan Chicago area.

== History ==
Founded in 1960 in Deerfield, Illinois, the Melodeers Chorus is an a cappella chorus of female singers who sing in the barbershop style. Based in Wheeling, Illinois, they are the seven-time International Champion Chorus of Sweet Adelines International, the world's largest singing organization for women, with over 17,000 members worldwide. More than 500 choruses compete each year in regional contests to qualify for the international contest to determine the International Champion Chorus.

The Melodeers have won the championship title in the years 2014, 2011, 2008, 2003, 2000, 1997, and 1994. Choruses placing first in the international contest are required to sit out regional qualifying contests for two years after winning. Their most recent win was in Baltimore on November 8, 2014, with a score of 3129. They are the 2024 Harmony Classic AA Champion Chorus.

Renée Porzel is the Music Director of the Melodeers Chorus. In her previous roles as Showmanship Coordinator and Associate Director of the Melodeers, she was responsible for the creative direction of the chorus, the development of new music initiatives, and assisted with the management of the music staff.

Renée is a member of the Sweet Adelines International Faculty Program and is a Certified Visual Communication Judge. She served on the Sweet Adelines International Board of Directors for several years, and was International President from 2012-14.

Renee coaches choruses and quartets around the world, and specializes in helping groups reach their potential visually and vocally, so they can accomplish their performance and competition goals.

The Melodeers were directed by Jim Arns, from 1988-2023, when he took the Melodeers to their 7 International Championships.

The chorus is made up of approximately 90 singers, ranging in age from 20 to 80. Members hail not only from the Chicago metropolitan area, but from downstate Illinois, Indiana, Michigan, and Wisconsin. Members—homemakers, business owners, attorneys, medical and health professionals, to name a few of their backgrounds—are united by their love of singing and a desire to learn more about vocal production, women's barbershop singing, and performing.

Members of the chorus have given their talents to assist others in their musical education. Some members serve currently on the Sweet Adelines International Board of Directors, the International Faculty, the International Judging Program, and on the Management Team of the SAI Lake Michigan Region 3 board. Some members of the chorus also sing in quartets, four of which—Jubilation, the Melo-Edge, Chicago Fire, and the Four Bettys—were named Sweet Adelines International Champion Quartets.

The Melodeers typically produce two shows each year: one in the fall, and one celebrating the December holiday season, called Jingle Mingle. The Melodeers have performed at Ravinia Festival and have sung the National Anthem many times at games of the Chicago Cubs.

The Melodeers have been the recipients of grants from the National Endowment for the Arts, the Illinois Arts Council and the Young Singers Foundation, official charity of Sweet Adelines International.
