= The Rich-Tone Chorus =

Women's barbershop chorus

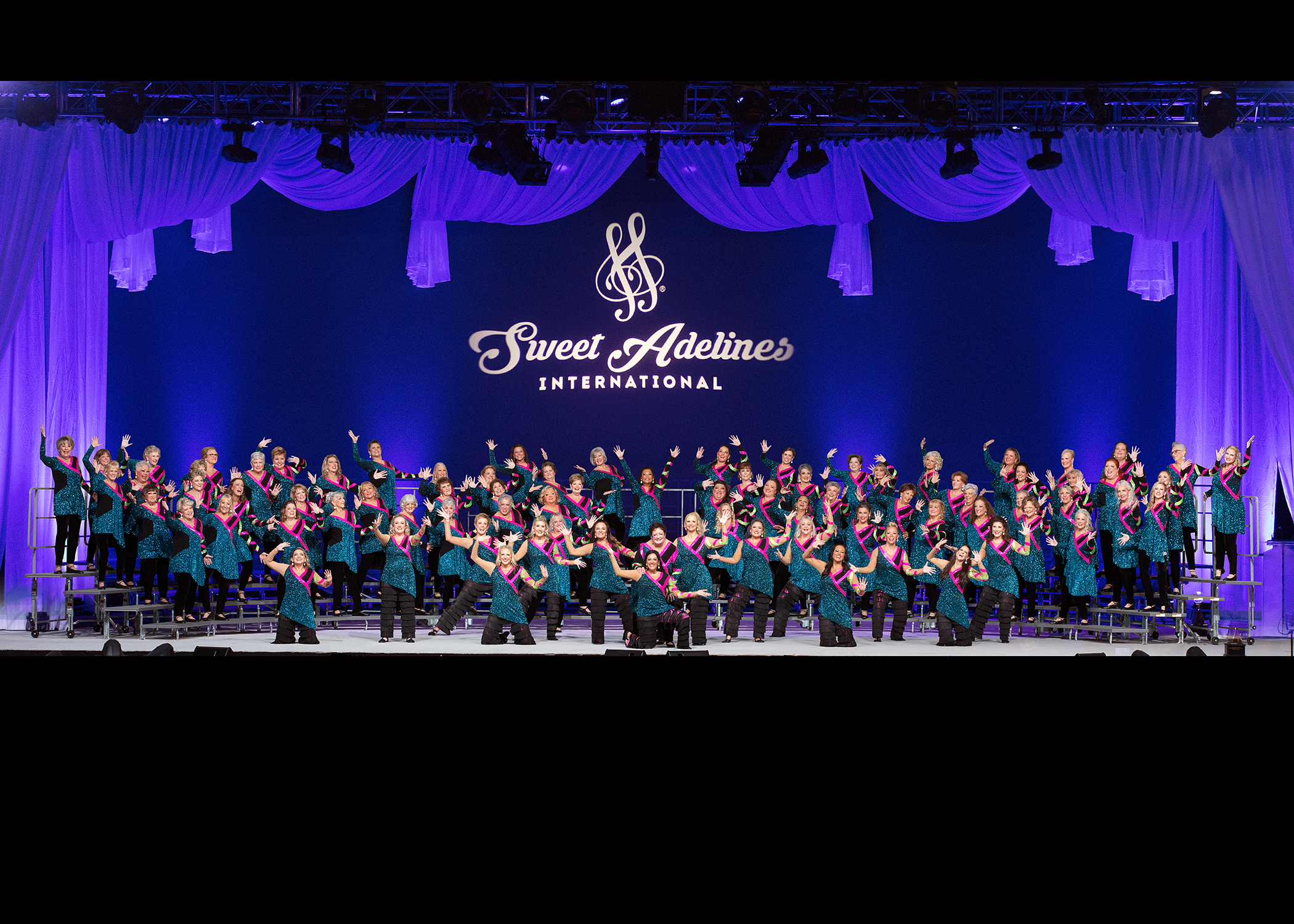
- 2022 International Chorus Finals, Phoenix, AZ

Background information
- Origin: Dallas Fort Worth, Texas, USA
- Genres: a cappella
- Years active: 1968–present
- Website: www.richtones.org

The Rich-Tone Chorus is an all-female, barbershop chorus, located in northern Texas in the United States. The group was founded in 1968 in the city of Richardson. Dale Syverson was musical director from 1976 until her death in November 2024.

The Rich-Tone Chorus is a chapter, located in Northern Texas, of a worldwide non-profit organization known as Sweet Adelines International. This is a group of over 30,000 women committed to advancing the musical art form of barbershop harmony through education and performance.

The members of the Rich-Tone Chorus range in age from 23 to 89 and are from all over the North Texas area. The membership is drawn from a cross-section of society; including accountants, doctors, engineers, homemakers, nurses, and teachers.

The Rich-Tones' musical repertoire includes contemporary hits, big band, Broadway and American classics.

== International recognition ==
Internationally, the Rich-Tone Chorus aim to compete by displaying an innovative entertainment style that pushes the limits of barbershop music. Each year, Sweet Adelines choruses throughout the world compete at an annual competition – the Olympics of Barbershop. Twenty-six regional championship choruses compete for the gold medal title of International Chorus Champions. The Rich-Tone Chorus is the first in its five-state region to earn the world's championship titles and will return to International Competition again.

The Rich-Tone Chorus have developed a progressive entertainment style as well as a strong barbershop sound, and have been judged the "best in the world" six times: in 1992, 1995, 1998, 2006, 2009, and 2022. They are the first chorus in the history of the Sweet Adelines International to win three consecutive first place medals. The Rich-Tone Chorus was also the first chorus in the organization to achieve a score of 700 for a single performance in 1992, giving their director, Dale Syverson, the first 'Master Director 700' title.

In 2012 Rich-Tones were honored to win 2nd place and the first ever Celebrity Award, presented by celebrity judge Cynthia Hessin, executive producer Rocky Mountain PBS and given to the chorus most likely to appeal to a non-barbershop audience.

== History ==
International Competition Year	Location	Placement	Songs	Score
1983	Detroit, MI	12th	Deed I Do, Forgive Me	1048
1985	Kansas City, KS	6th	I'm Alone Because I Love You, Sweet Georgia Brown. Mic Testers: All That Jazz, Let's Hear It For the Boy	1150
1987	Honolulu, HI	3rd	I'm Alone Because I Love You, Broadway Star Medley, Sweet Georgia Brown, Broadway Medley, Rhythm of the Night, Music and the Mirror	2617
1989	Miami Beach, FL	2nd	I Never Knew Medley, I'm Alone Because I Love You, Broadway Ballad, Broadway Star Medley, Music and the Mirror, Great Day	2654
1992	Baltimore, MD	1st	Swanee, (I'm Afraid) The Masquerade Is Over, Mistakes, Sweet Georgia Brown, I've Got the Music in Me, Stuff Like That There, Conga	2884
1995	New Orleans, LA	1st	Liar Medley, Beside an Open Fire Place, Alexander's Ragtime Band, Why Haven't I Heard from You, Proud Mary	2809
1998	Nashville, TN	1st	You're Breaking in a New Heart, Swanee, Pal of My Cradle Days, Rock-a-bye Your Baby, Hit That Jive Jack, Turn the Beat Around	2805
2001	Portland, OR	2nd	Rock-a-bye Your Baby, Pal of My Cradle Days, Please Don't Talk About Me, For All We Know, Straighten Up and Fly Right, Survivor, Magic Medley	2878
2003	Phoenix, AZ	3rd	(I'm Afraid) The Masquerade Is Over, Mardi Gras March, Born to Be Wild, Please Don't Talk About Me, Berkeley Square, My Strongest Suit	2840
2006	Las Vegas, NV	1st	Berkeley Square, Nobody's Sweetheart Now, Yes Sir That's My Baby, I'm Alone Because I Love You, New Attitude, Man of La Mancha	2942
2009	Nashville, TN	1st	I'll Never Stop Loving You, Smile Medley, Yes Sir That's My Baby, Berkeley Square, High School Musical, Rich-Tone Evolution of Dance	3054
2012	Denver, CO	2nd	All The Way, Hot Town Strutter's Ball, Let Yourself Go, Berkeley Square, The Night Has a Thousand Eyes, Born This Way	3049
2014	Baltimore, MD	2nd	Berkeley Square, Hot Town Strutter's Ball, Motown Medley (Dancing in the Street/Get Ready), I'll Be Easy to Find, Let Yourself Go, Michael Jackson Medley (Beat It/Bad )	3085
2016	Las Vegas, NV	2nd	(I'm Afraid) The Masquerade Is Over, Hot Town Strutter's Ball, Heartbreaker, I'll Be Easy To Find, Cell Block Tango, Rolling in the Deep	2983
2018	St. Louis, MO	3rd	On My Own, South Rampart Street Parade/That's a Plenty, (I'm Afraid) The Masquerade Is Over, Time and Tide, Better When I'm Dancin'//Can't Stop the Feeling!, This Is Me	2959
2022	Phoenix, AZ	1st	On My Own, On a Wonderful Day Like Today, For Once in My Life, Uptown Funk, Stronger (What Doesn't Kill You), All By Myself	2929
2025	Columbus, OH	3rd	Climb Every Mountain, Kickin' The Clouds Away, Blame It On The Boogie, I Don't Dance, A Nightingale Sang In Berkeley Square, Never Gonna Not Dance Again, Dance Medley	2843

== Musical direction ==
Dale Syverson (March 31, 1949 – November 15, 2024) was the musical director of the Rich-Tone Chorus since 1976, during which time the chorus grew from 18 members to over 150. She was the daughter of a barbershopper and part of the Sweet Adelines organization since she was a child. She received the 2004 SAI "President's Lifetime Achievement Award", an honor which has been awarded annually by the president of Sweet Adelines International since 1998 to a member whose contributions to and achievements within the organization are truly exceptional. Syverson was a certified judge in both Expression and Sound categories. She was a two-time "Queen of Harmony," winning an international quartet gold medal singing with the Tiffanys in 1973 and Rumors in 1998.

Valerie Clark is the current director of the Rich-Tone Chorus. A Sweet Adelines International member since 1988, she has performed with multiple award-winning choruses and quartets. Joining the Rich-Tones in 2003, Clark served as associate director before succeeding Dale Syverson as director. Clark is a U.S. Army veteran, audio engineer, and lifelong musician.

== Discography ==
The Rich-Tone Chorus has produced 10 albums (CDs) for sale on their website and through popular online music sites, such as iTunes, Rhapsody, Spotify and Amazon Music.

- One of a Kind (1990)
- Turnin' Up the Heat (1993)
- Rich-Tones – Unwrapped! (1994)
- 50TH Anniversary (1995)
- Footloose (1996)
- Take 3 (1999)
- A "Live" and Swingin' (2000)
- Wrapped Up in the Holidays (2002)
- What Happens in Vegas (2007)
- Born This Way (2013)
