= SingUnited International =

Women's barbershop singing organization

Background information
- Origin: Tulsa, Oklahoma
- Genres: A Cappella; Barbershop music
- Years active: 1945–present
- Members: close to 21,000
- Website: singunited.org

SingUnited International, formerly called Sweet Adelines International, is a worldwide organization of women singers, established in 1945, committed to advancing the musical art form of barbershop harmony through education and performances. This independent, nonprofit music education association is one of the world's largest singing organizations for women. "Harmonize the World" is the organization's motto. It has a current membership of 23,000 and holds an annual international singing competition.

== History ==
Sweet Adelines International was established in 1945 by Edna Mae Anderson of Tulsa, Oklahoma. The aim was to teach and train its members in music and to create and promote barbershop quartets and other musical groups. She gathered a group of women who wanted to participate in the "chord-ringing, fun-filled harmony" that their husbands, members of the men's Society for the Preservation and Encouragement of Barbershop Quartet Singing in America (SPEBSQSA), were singing. SPEBSQSA has since changed its name to the Barbershop Harmony Society.

By year's end, the first chapter incorporated in Oklahoma with Anderson as its president. It had 85 members and a chapter name, Atomaton (for "an atom of an idea and a ton of energy") that recognized the Atomic Age.

Sweet Adelines went international on March 23, 1953, when the first chapter outside the U.S. was chartered in Brandon, Manitoba, Canada. Even though there were international chapters, it was not until May 1991 that the name officially changed to Sweet Adelines International.

In 1957, Harmony, Incorporated split from Sweet Adelines over a dispute regarding admission of Black members. SPEBSQSA and Sweet Adelines at that time restricted their membership to whites, but both opened membership to all races a few years later.

Today, the organization has a diverse membership that spans the globe. The organization includes women from a wide range of backgrounds who love to sing.

As of May 19, 2026, the organization changed its logo and name to SingUnited International with the intent to reflect inclusion and add resonance for future growth.

== Membership ==
In 2012, Sweet Adelines International claimed a membership of 24,000 women, all singing in English, including choruses in most of the fifty United States as well as in Australia, Canada, England, Finland, Germany, Ireland, Japan, New Zealand, Scotland, Sweden, Wales and the Netherlands. Headquartered in Tulsa, Oklahoma, the organization encompasses more than 1,200 registered quartets and 600 choruses.

== Regions ==
Region	Name	Approximate location	Map
1	North Atlantic	Eastern Canada, North-Eastern US	
2	Border Lakes	Ontario, Michigan	
3	Midwest Harmony	Illinois, Wisconsin, Indiana	
4	Harmony Heartland	Indiana, Ohio, Tennessee, West Virginia	
5	Spirit of the Midwest	Iowa, Illinois, Missouri	
6	Northern Lights	North Dakota, Minnesota, South Dakota	
8	Rocky Mountain	Colorado, Idaho, Nebraska, Utah, Wyoming	
9	Coastal Harmony	Florida, Georgia, South Carolina	
10	Great Gulf Coast	Alabama, Louisiana, Mississippi, Texas	
11	Sequoia Pacifica	California, Nevada	
12	Pacific Shores	California, Oregon, Nevada, Hawaii	
13	North by Northwest	Montana, Washington, Alaska, Oregon	
14	Heart of the Blue Ridge	North Carolina, South Carolina, Virginia	
15	Greater NYNJ	New Jersey, New York	
16	Lake Ontario	Ontario, New York	
17	Great Lakes Harmony	Michigan, Indiana, Ohio, Pennsylvania, New York	
19	Atlantic Bay-Mountain	Delaware, Maryland, New Jersey, Pennsylvania	
21	Golden West	Arizona, California, New Mexico	
25	Heart of America	Texas, Arkansas, Oklahoma, Kansas, Missouri, Tennessee	
26	Canadian Maple Leaf	Western Canada	
30	Satellite region	Rest of the world	
31	Quartet of Nations	United Kingdom, Ireland, The Netherlands	
32	Nordic Light	Finland, Sweden	
34	Southern Cross	Australia	
35	New Zealand	New Zealand	

For organizational purposes, all choruses and quartets affiliate to SAI as members of a geographic "region", each region being approximately the same size in terms of total SAI members. The number and boundaries of the regions are adjusted periodically and as of 2015 there are 28 active regions numbered 1–35. (Region numbers 7, 18, 20, 24, 27–29, and 33 no longer exist, and were merged into neighboring regions.) Corresponding to its popularity and origin in the US, the vast majority of regions are allocated to geographic areas of the US. This is followed by five regions allocated to Canada, one each to Australia and New Zealand, one each to Great Britain, Ireland and the Netherlands, and Finland and Sweden. A final "satellite" region is reserved for anywhere else in the world.

== International Convention and Competition ==
In 1947, the organization held a convention as a means to gather all members together in a group forum. A contest was held for the best female barbershop quartet in Tulsa, Oklahoma. The winners that first year were the Decaturettes from Decatur, Illinois. The members were Viola Phillips singing Tenor, Mary Minton singing Lead, Myrtle Vest singing Baritone, and Eva Adams singing Bass.

In 1973, the organization held its first international chorus competition in Washington, D.C. 64 members on stage singing Heart of My Heart/That Old Gang of Mine medley and There's a New Gang on the Corner, Racine Chorus from Racine, Wisconsin were the first chorus to receive the "international champion chorus" title. With Racine Chorus' international win, chorus director Jarmela Speta, member of 1955 International Champion The Nota-Belles, became the first of six Sweet Adelines to win gold medals as both a chorus director and a quartet member.

== World's largest singing lesson ==
Sweet Adelines International set the Guinness World Record for Largest Singing Lesson on October 24, 2009, at 7:30 p.m. The record-setting event coincided with the 63rd annual International Convention and Competition held at the Sommet Center in Nashville, Tennessee.

Music professional and past Sweet Adelines International Quartet Champion Peggy Gram led the lesson by demonstrating inspiring techniques for integrating the voice into the art form. The venue was filled with sound as 6,651 singers practiced the demonstrated techniques and sang simultaneously for the duration of the 10-minute lesson.

Guinness World Records official adjudicator Danny Girton Jr. presided over the certificate ceremony to validate the record and confirm that the achievement met the criteria set forth by the organization.

== See also ==
- Barbershop arranging
- Sweet Adeline (song)
