= List of guest stars on Sesame Street =

The following is a list of guest stars who have appeared on the television series Sesame Street.

== # ==
- 14 Karat Soul
- Anderson .Paak

== A ==
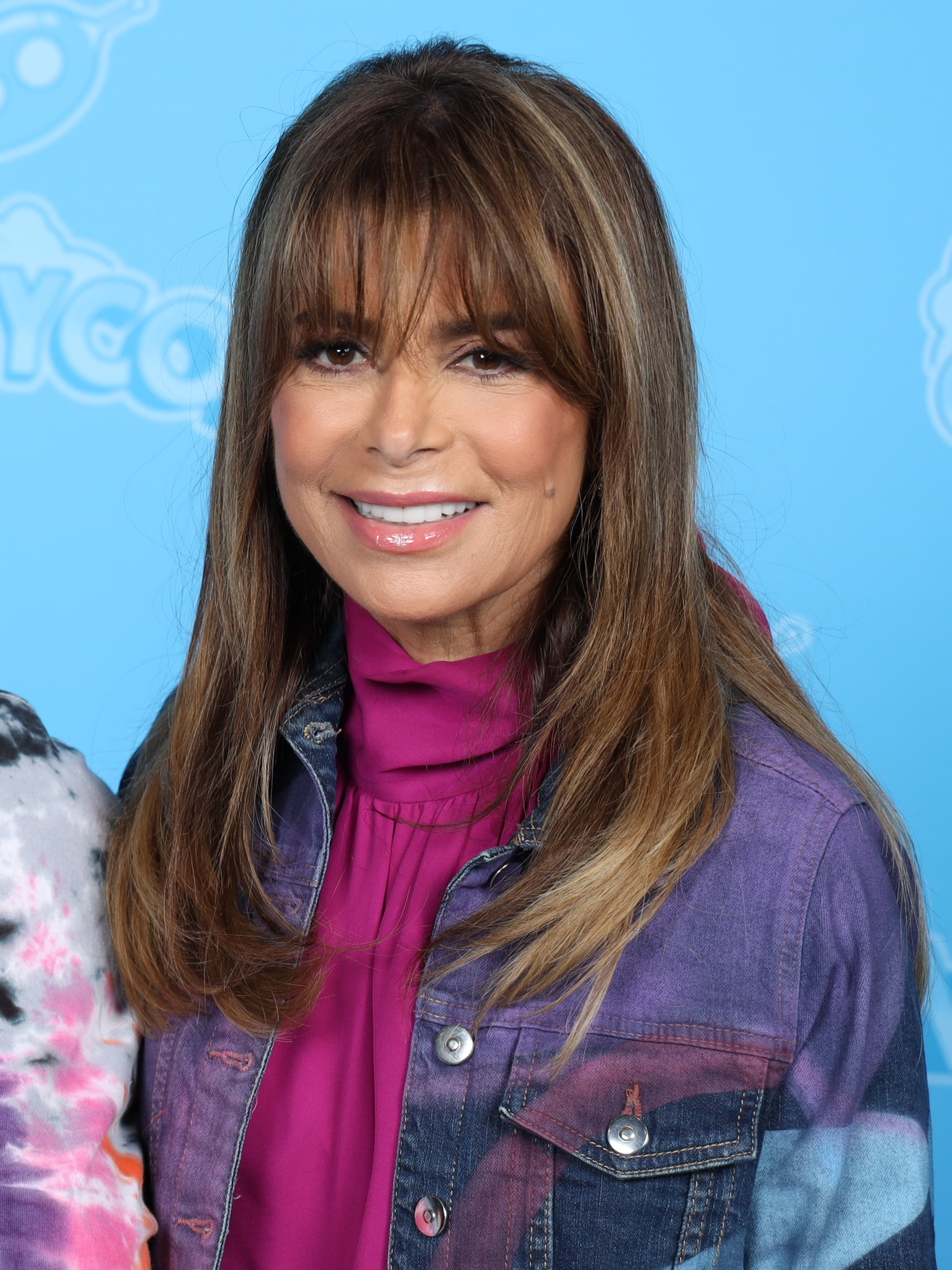
Paula Abdul

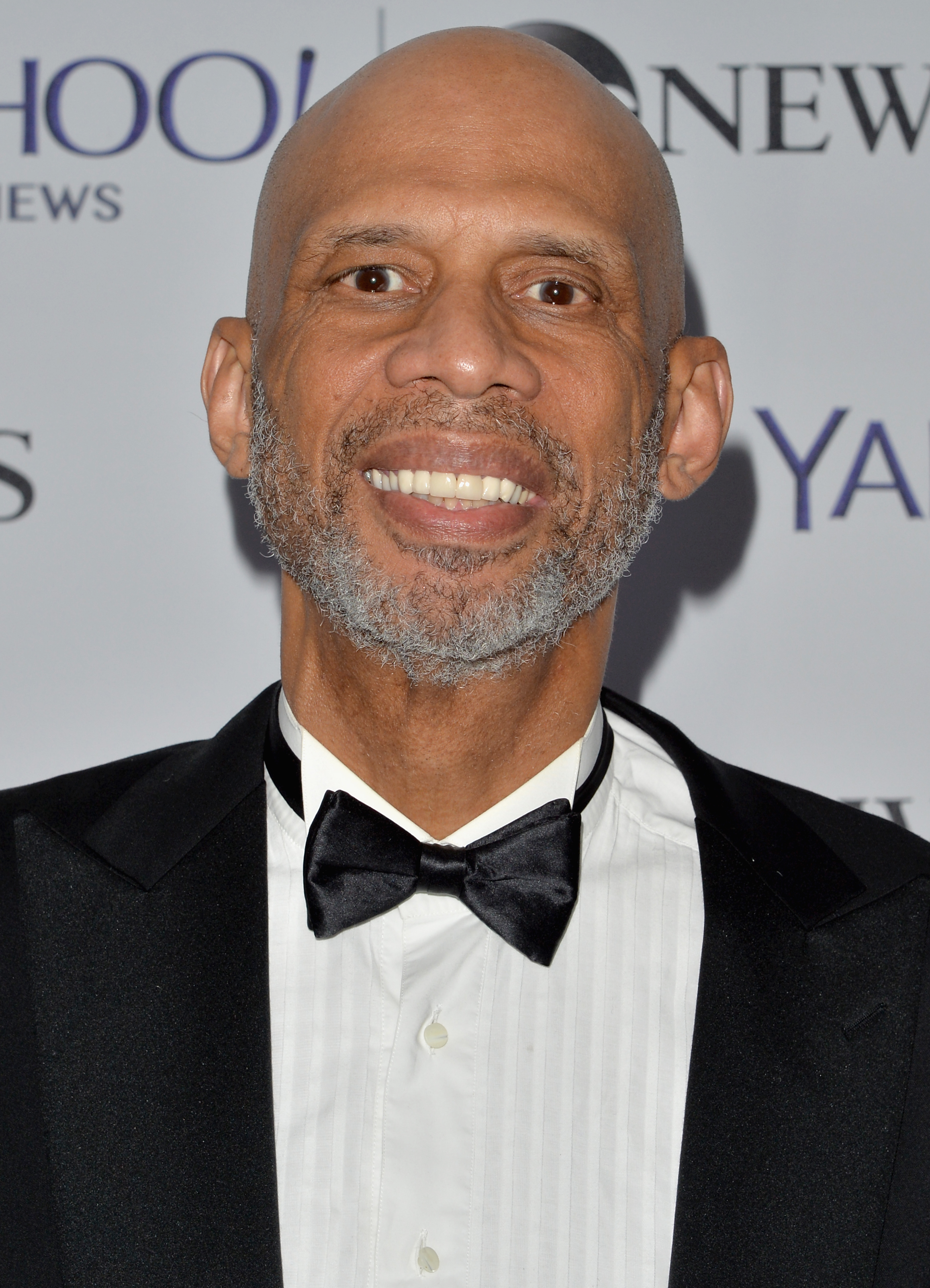
Kareem Abdul-Jabbar

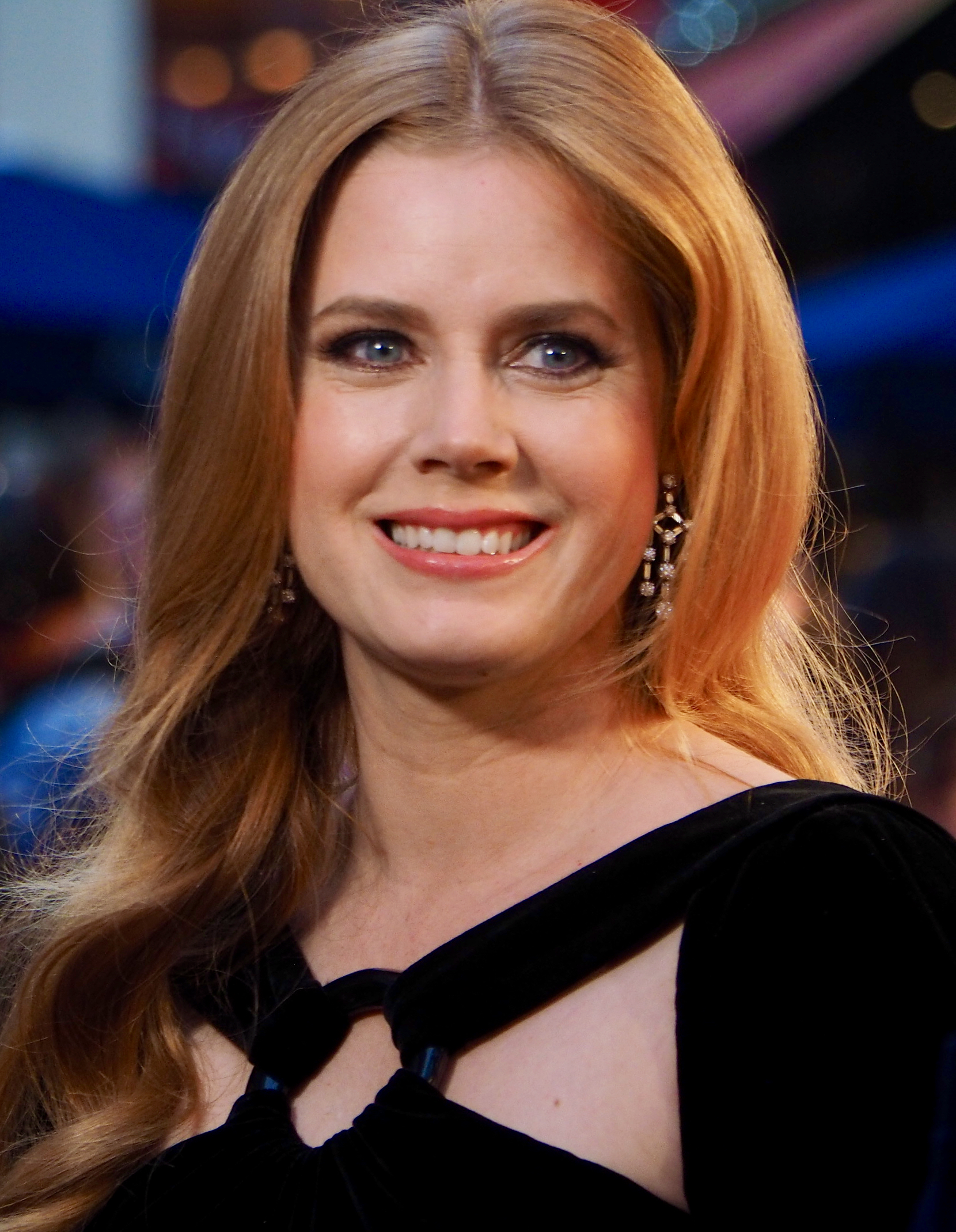
Amy Adams

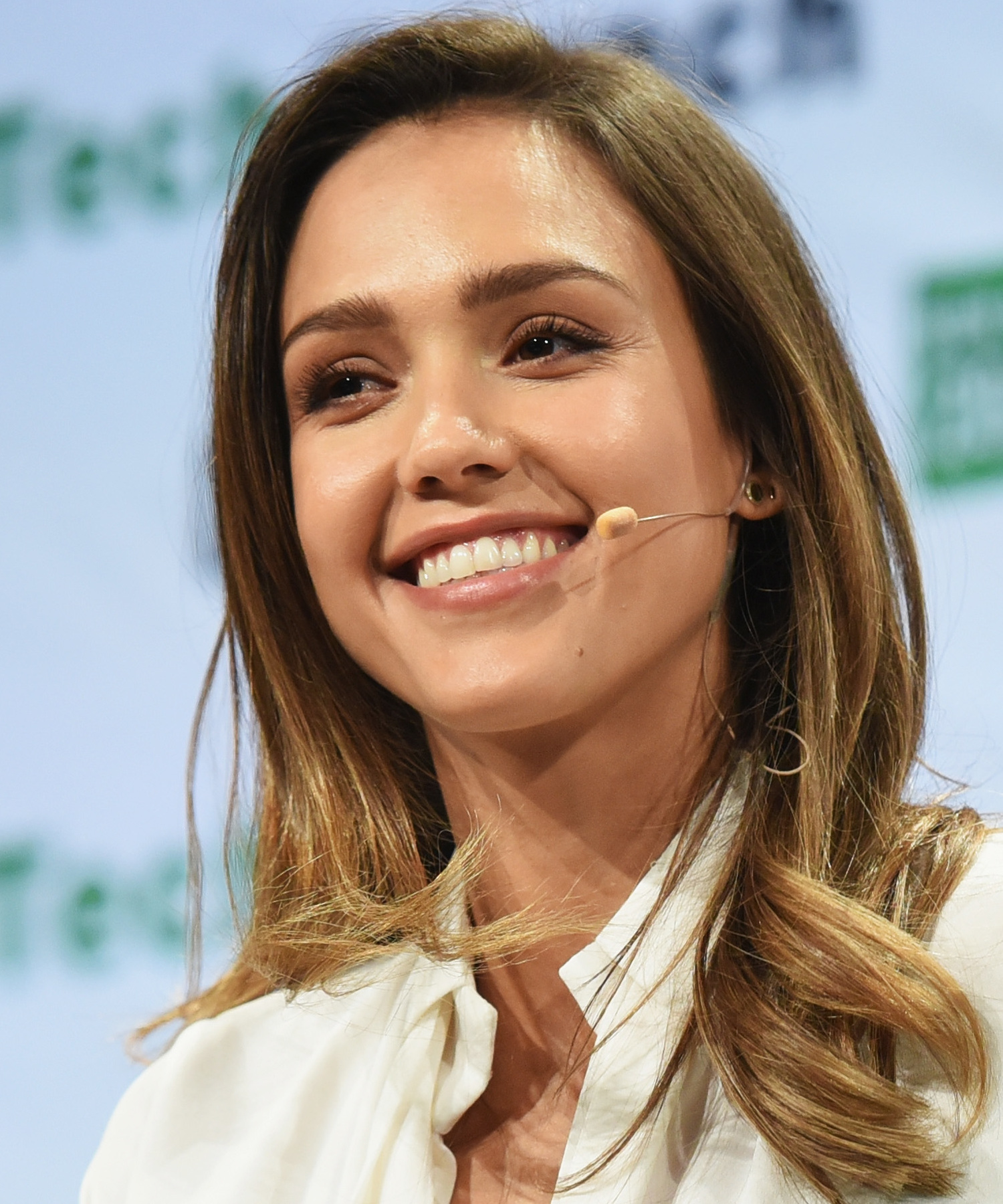
Jessica Alba

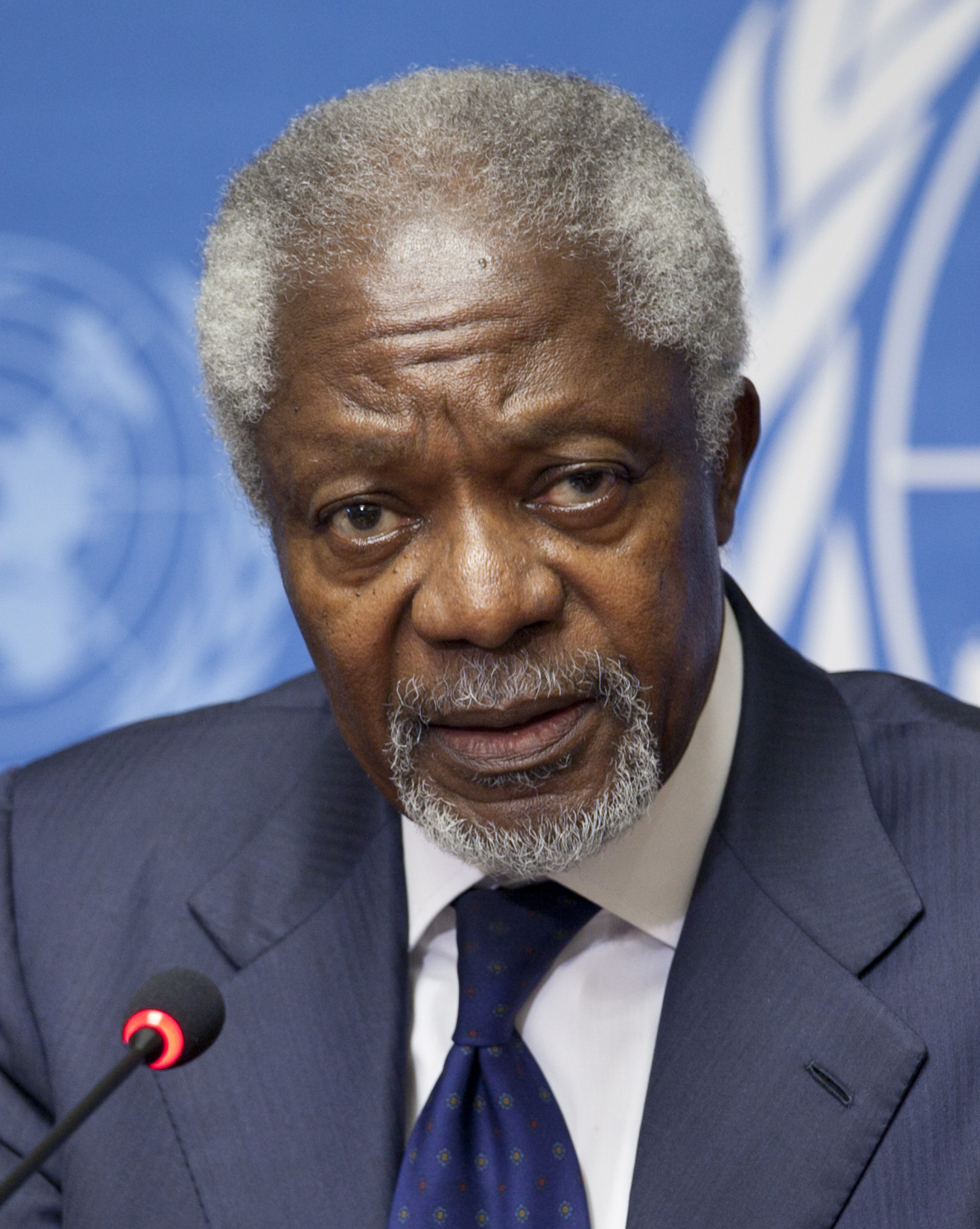
Kofi Annan

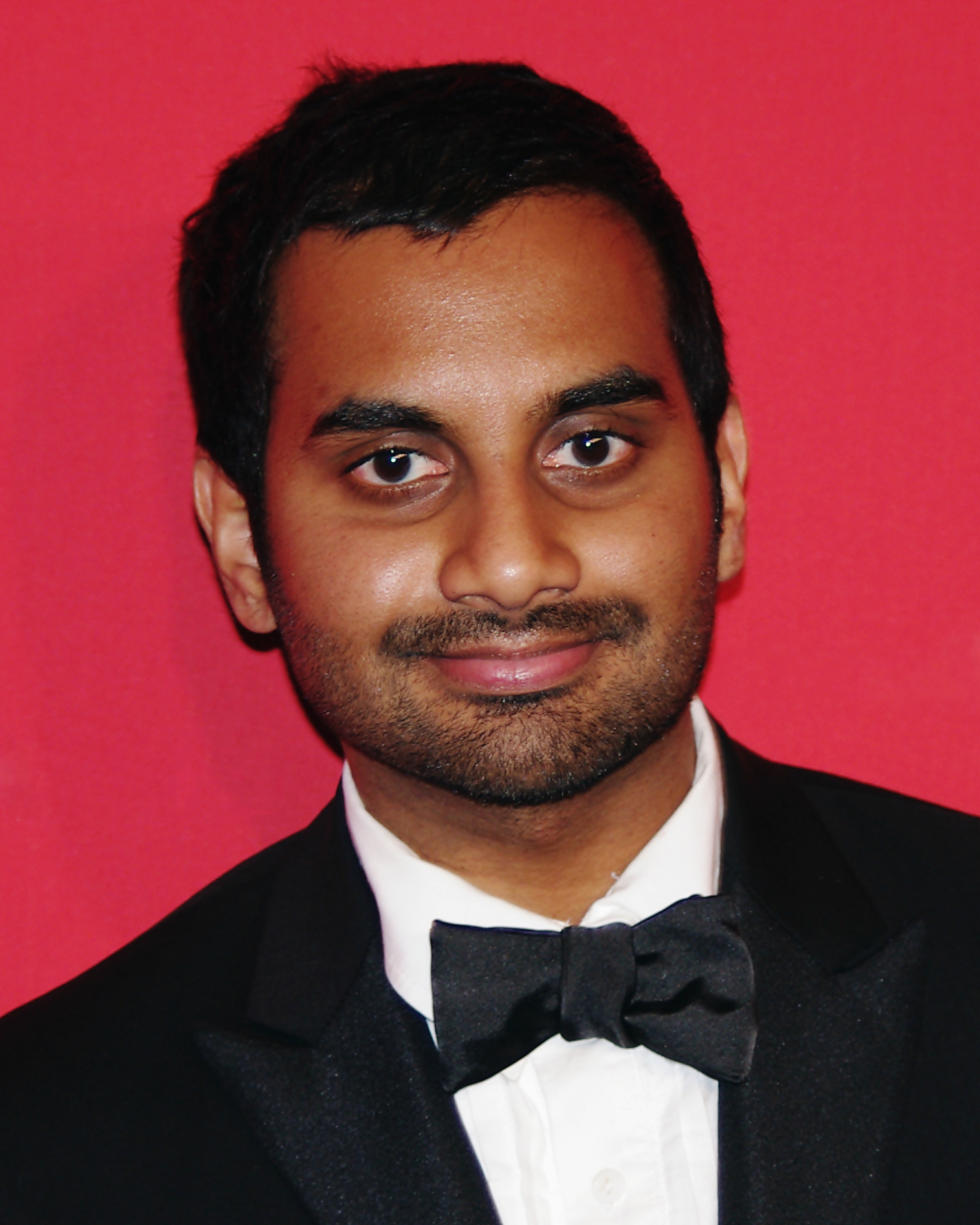
Aziz Ansari

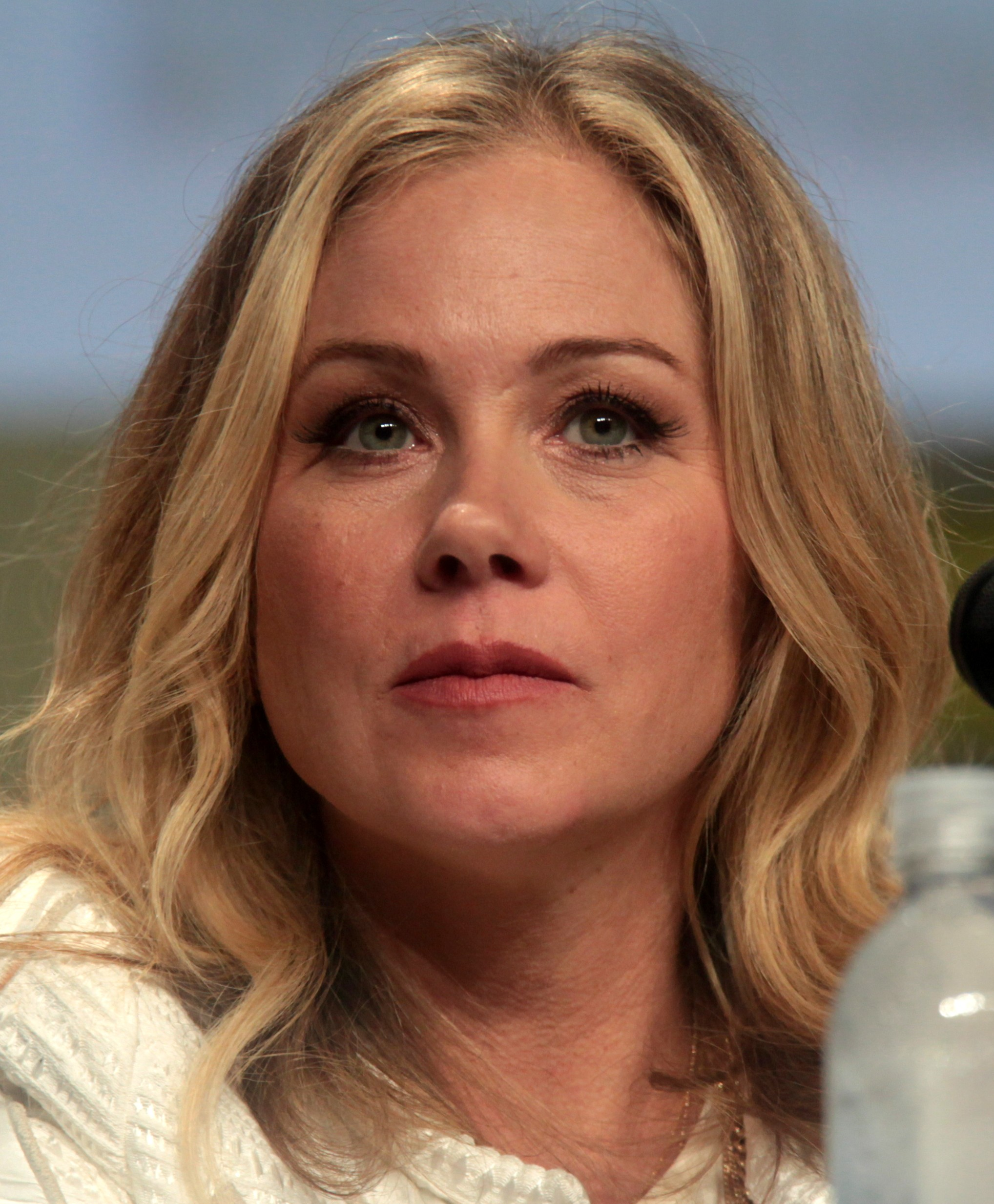
Christina Applegate

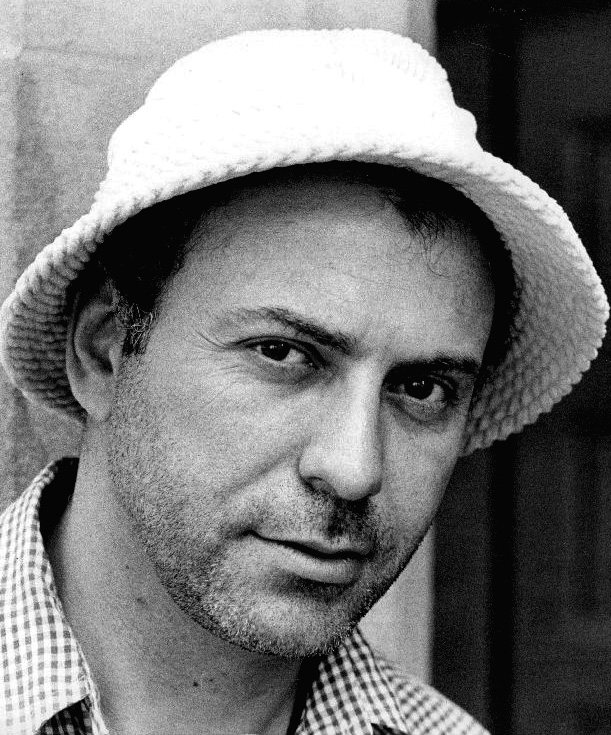
Alan Arkin

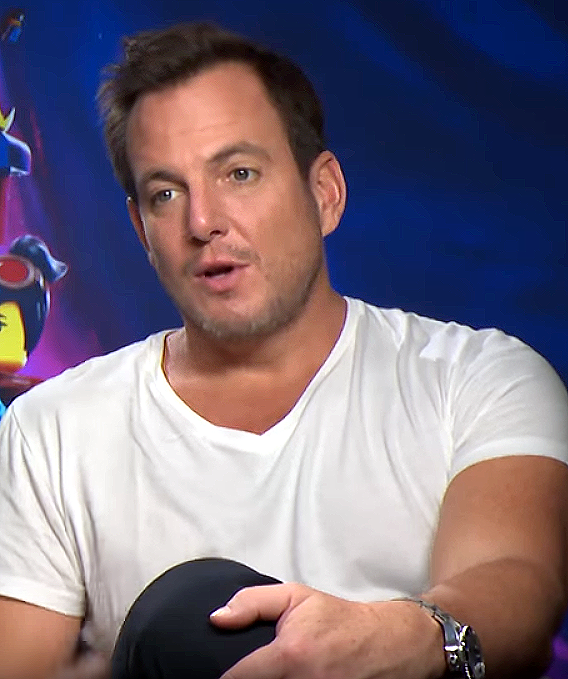
Will Arnett

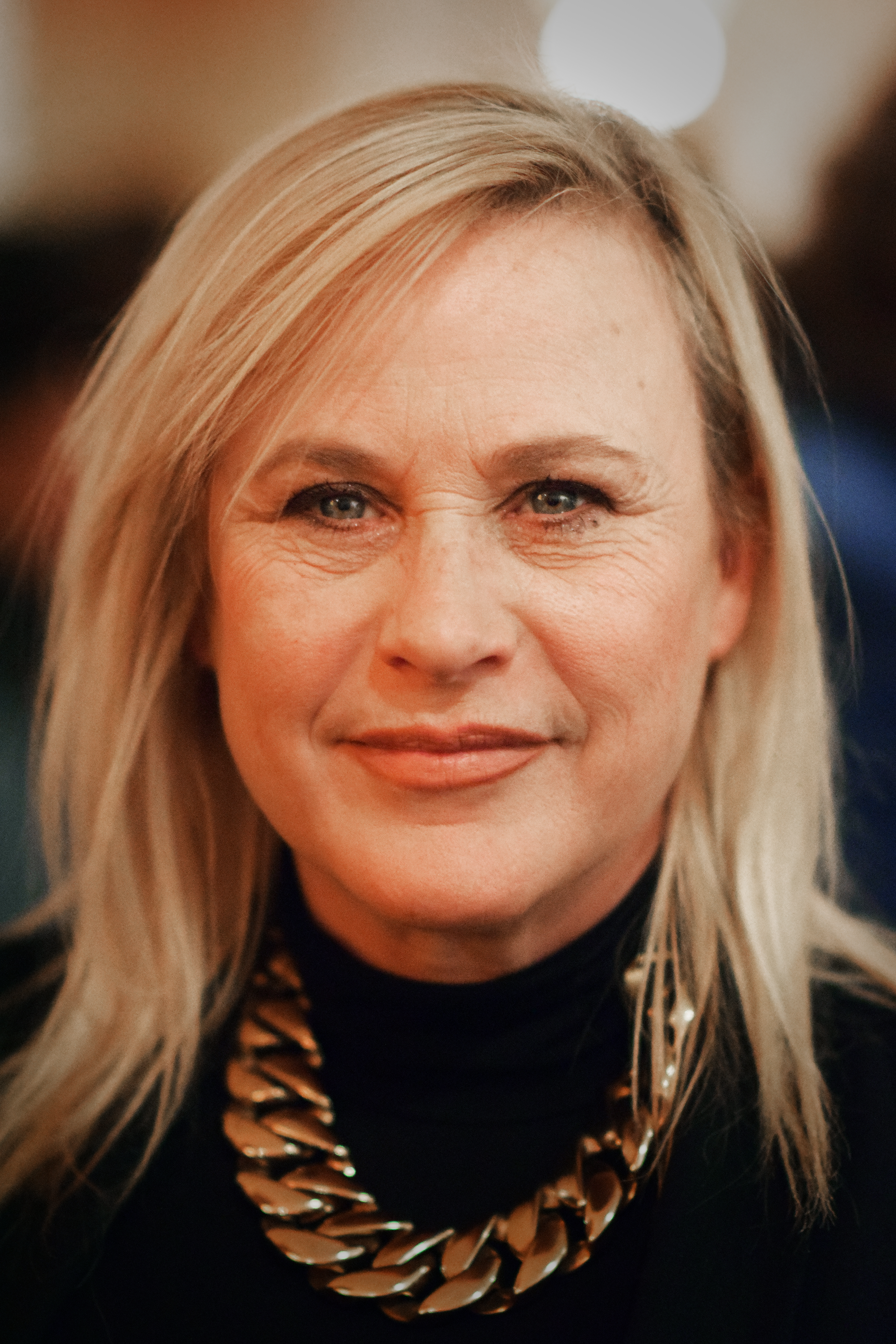
Patricia Arquette

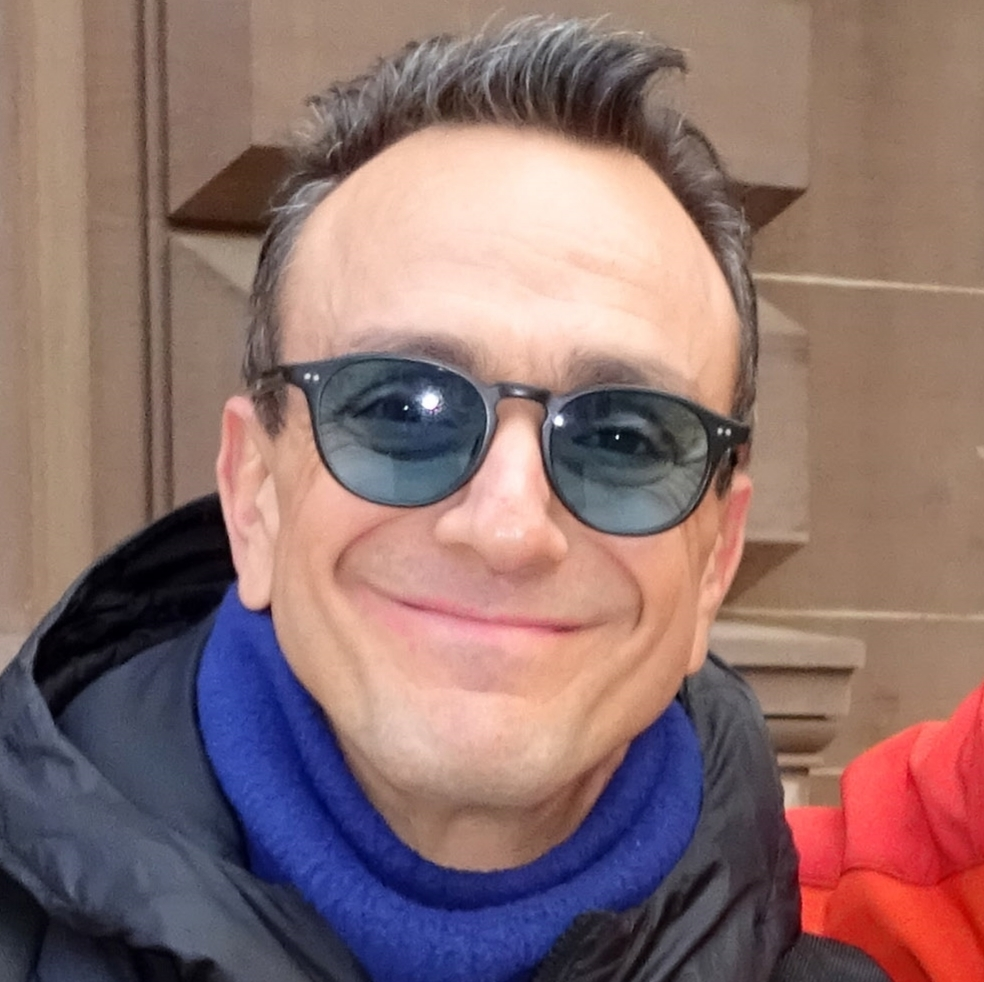
Hank Azaria
- Paula Abdul Zoe's Dance Moves
- Kareem Abdul-Jabbar defines the word "subtraction" with Big Bird
- Amy Adams defines "ingredient" with Elmo
- Casey Affleck demonstrates the word "careful" with Murray
- Jessica Alba defines the word "scrumptious"
- Marv Albert episode 2756
- Buzz Aldrin NASA footage of Apollo 11 mission, episode 3697; explains to Cookie Monster that the moon is not a giant cookie, episode 4090
- Jason Alexander
- Dennis Allen
- Maria Conchita Alonso
- Alvin Ailey American Dance Theater
- Maya Angelou
- Kofi Annan helps Elmo and his friends sing the alphabet
- Aziz Ansari defines the word "ridiculous" with Grover
- Carmelo Anthony defines the word "compare" with Grover
- Christina Applegate defines the word "booth" with Elmo
- Alan Arkin
- Will Arnett appeared as Max the Magician in episode 4166
- Patricia Arquette defines the word "metamorphosis" with Abby Cadabby
- Arrested Development
- Arthur Ashe
- Anthony Atkinson Jr. for the Harlem Globetrotters
- Hank Azaria defines the word "imposters" with Elmo

== B ==
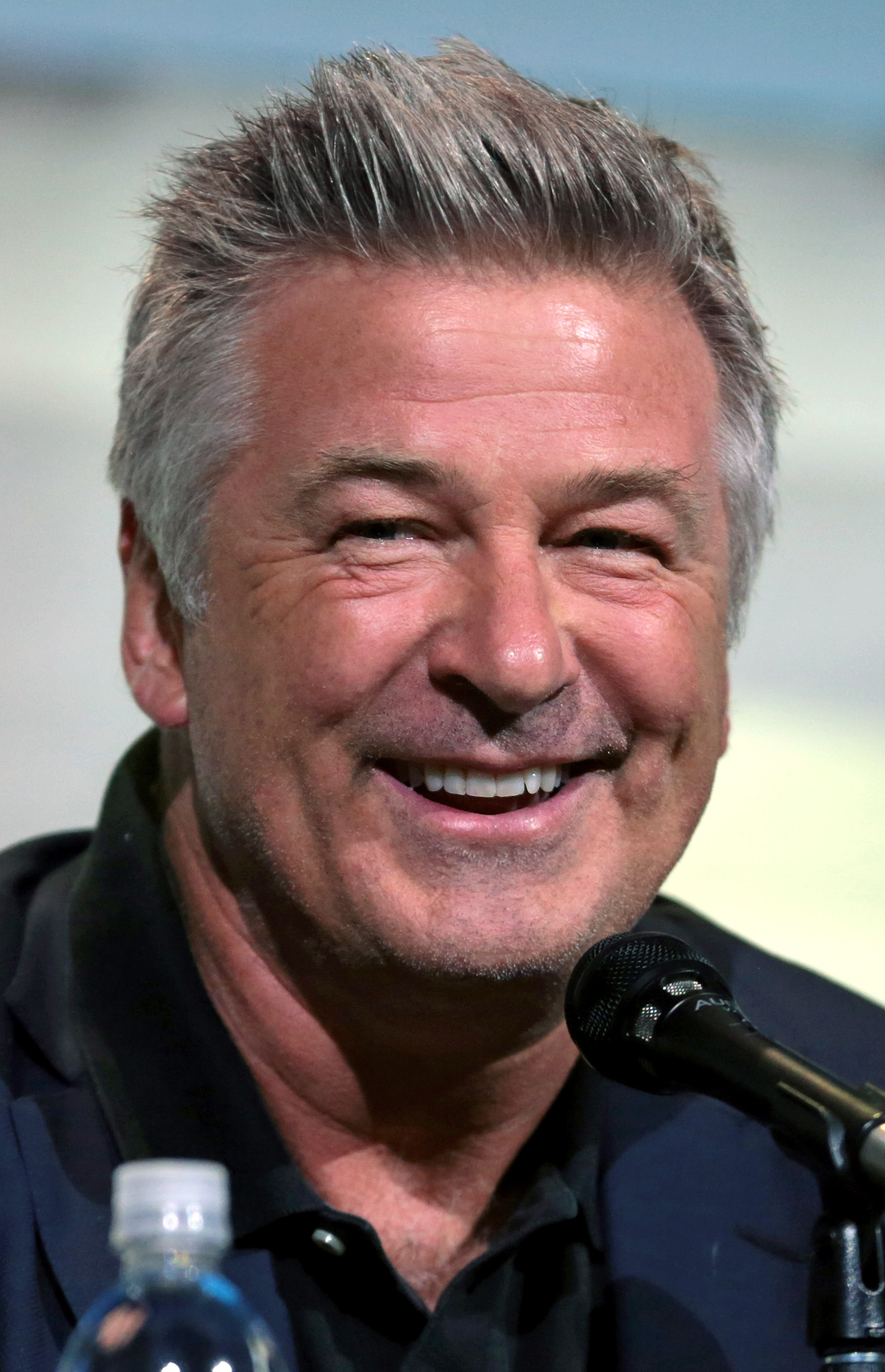
Alec Baldwin

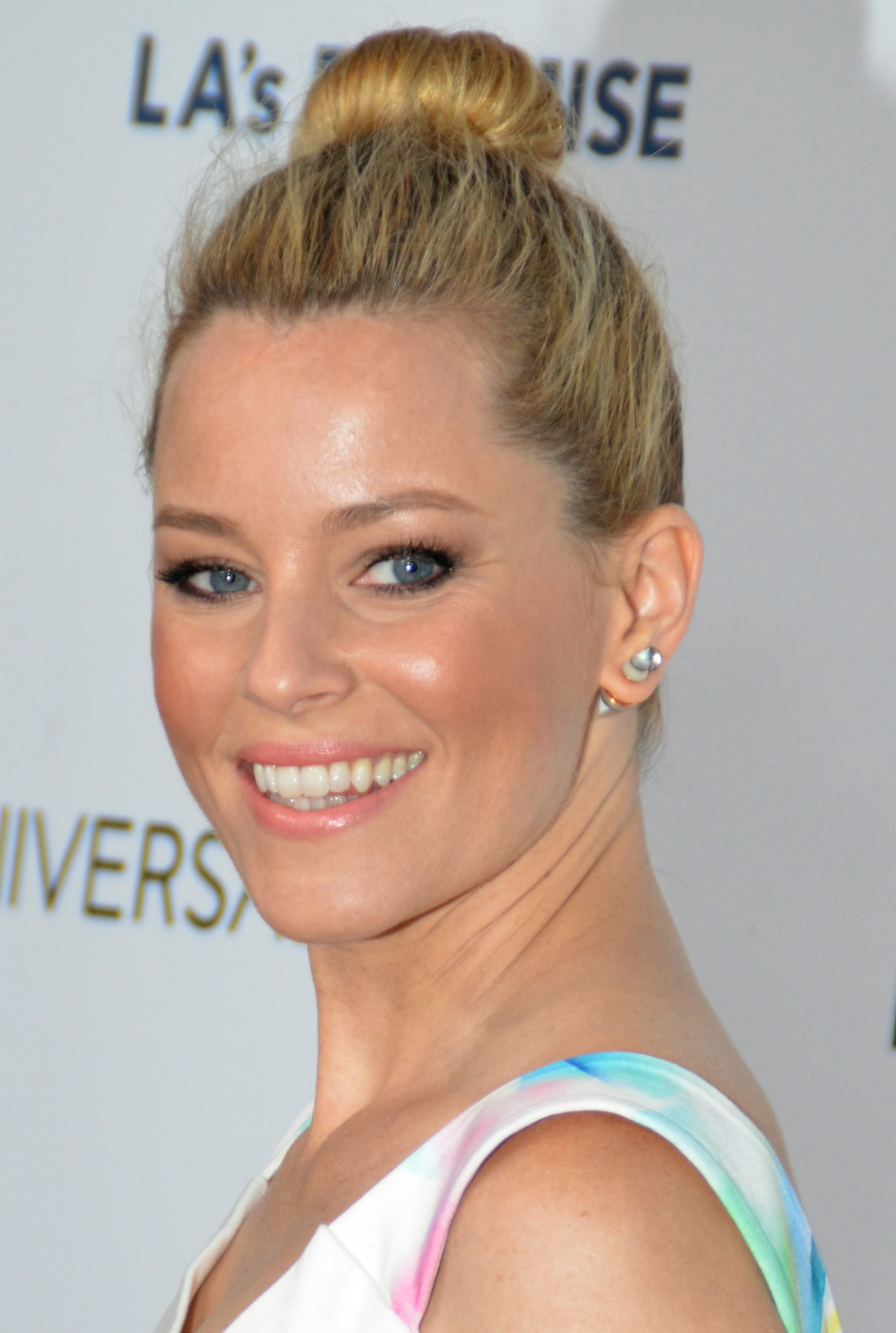
Elizabeth Banks

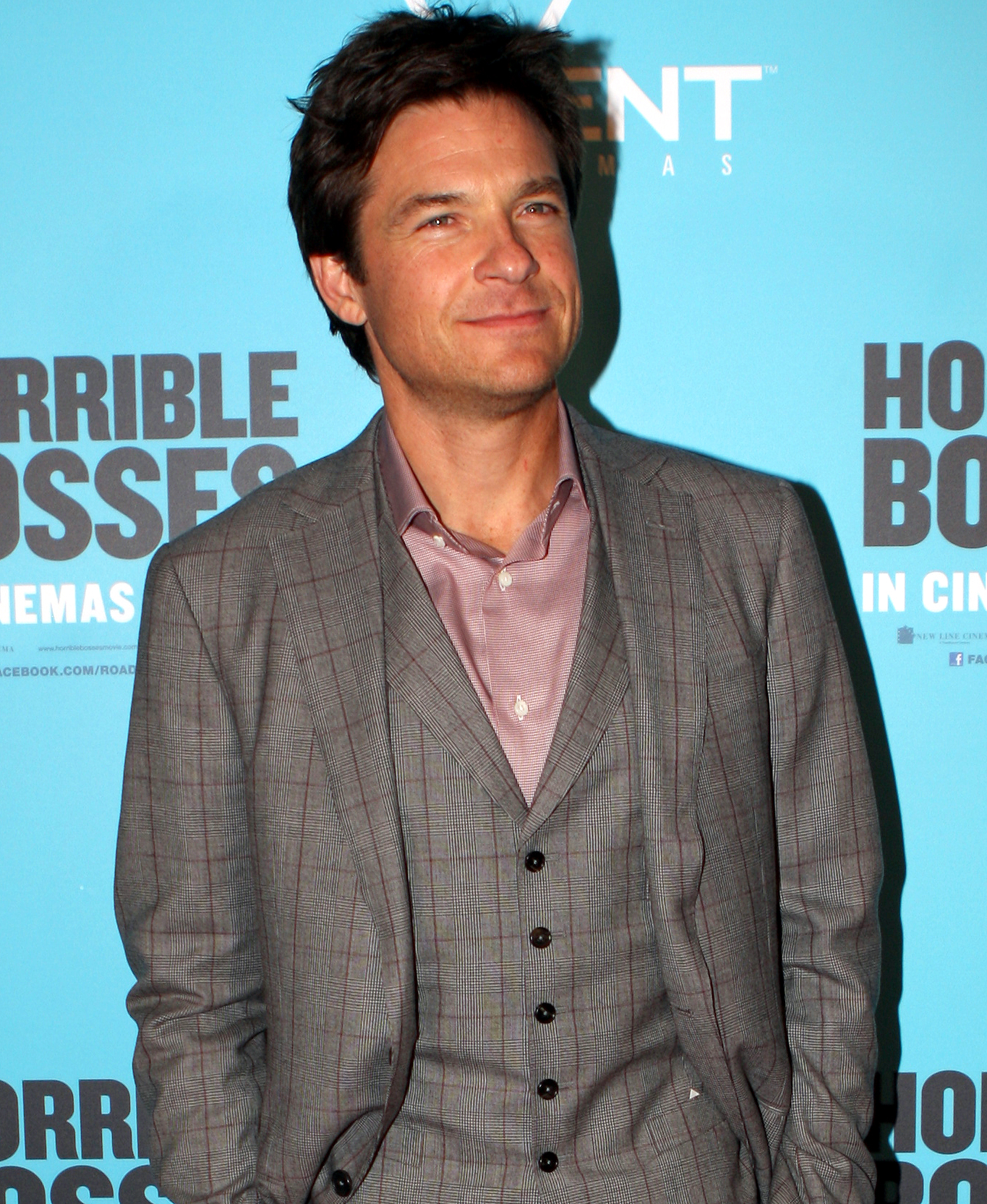
Jason Bateman

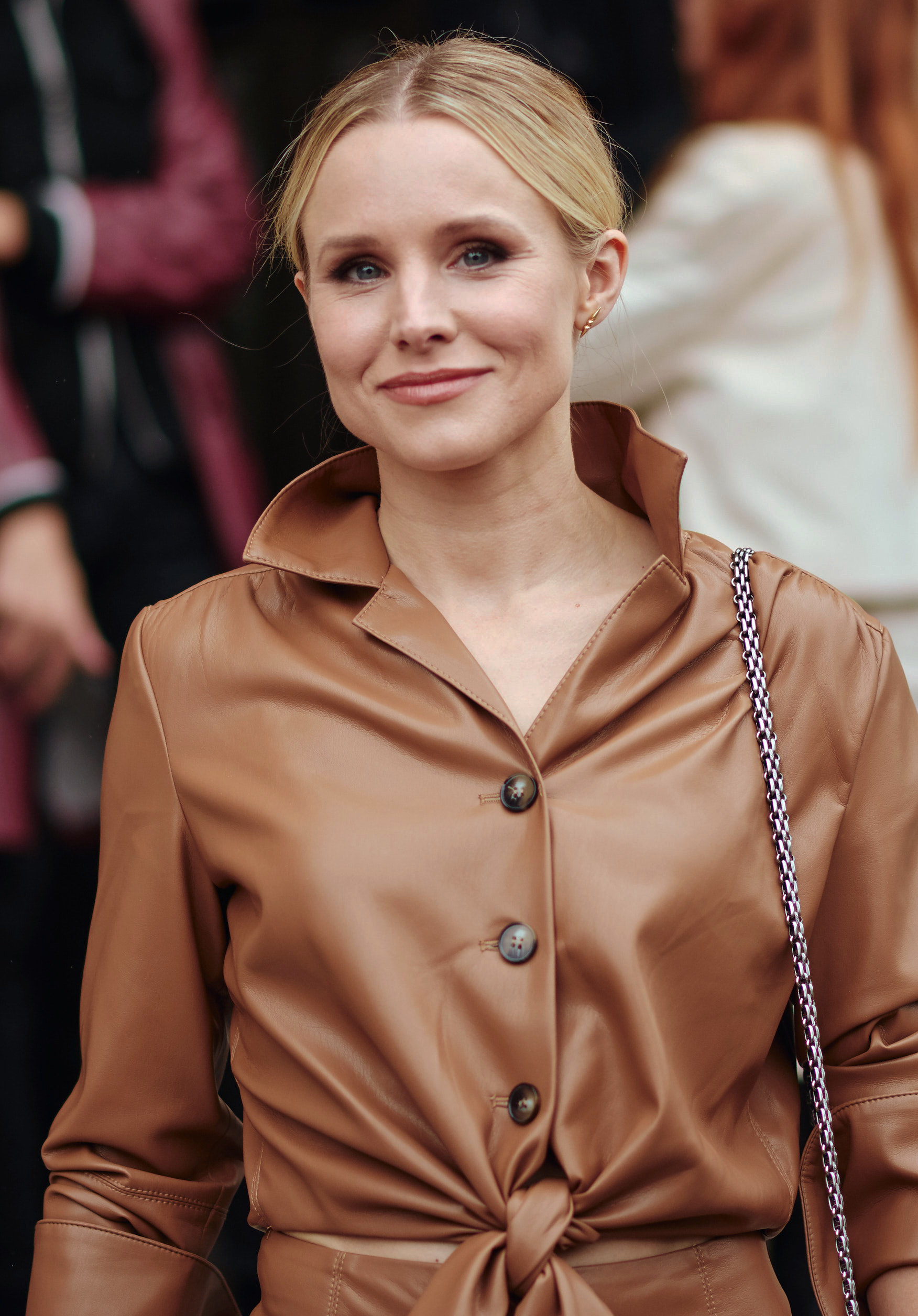
Kristen Bell

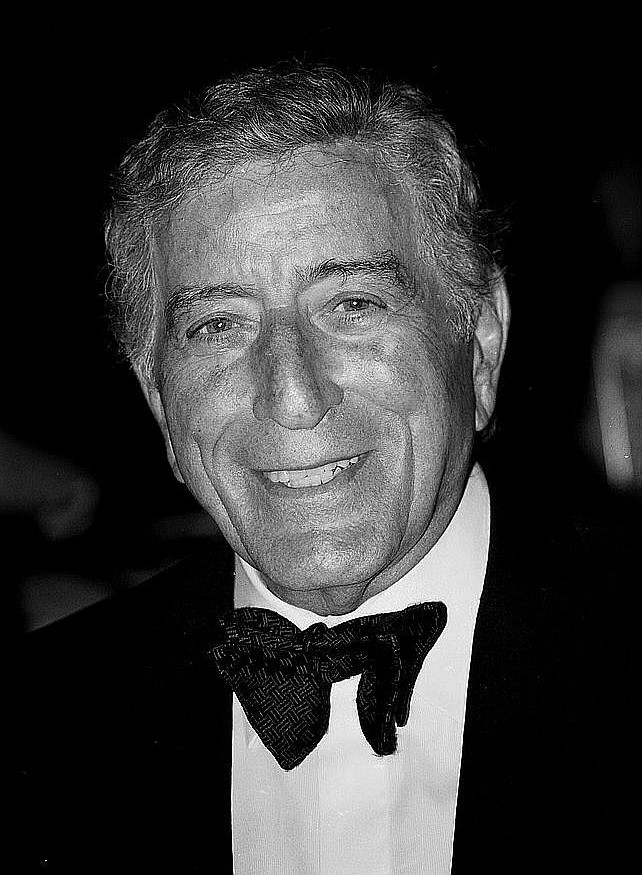
Tony Bennett

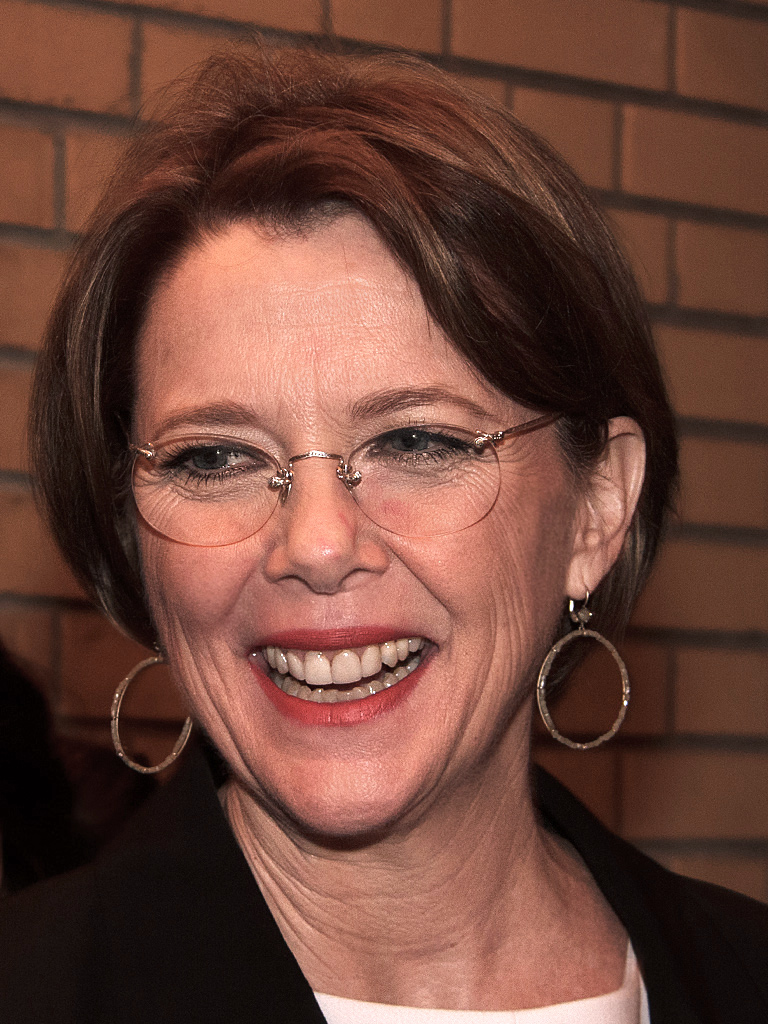
Annette Bening

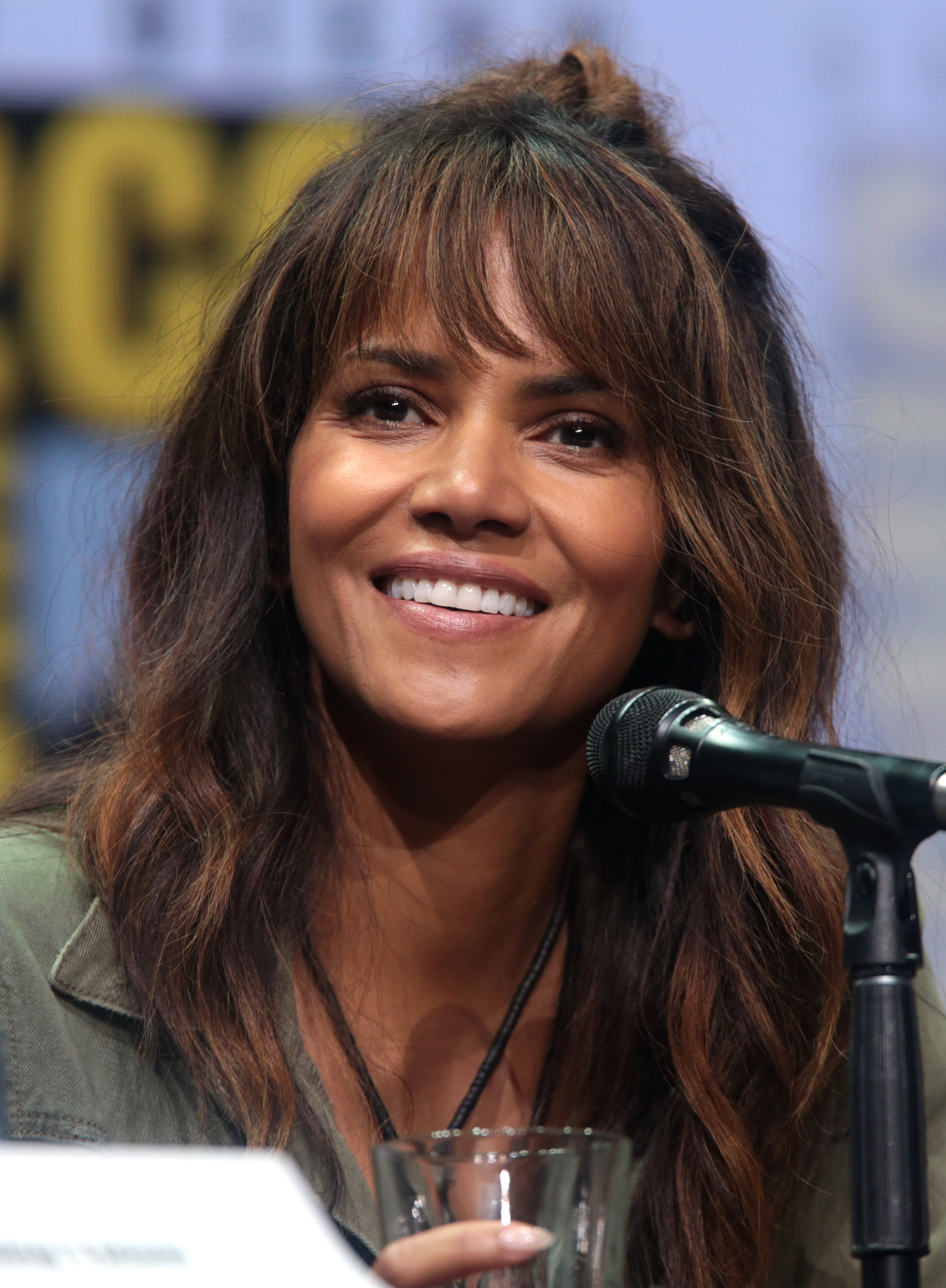
Halle Berry

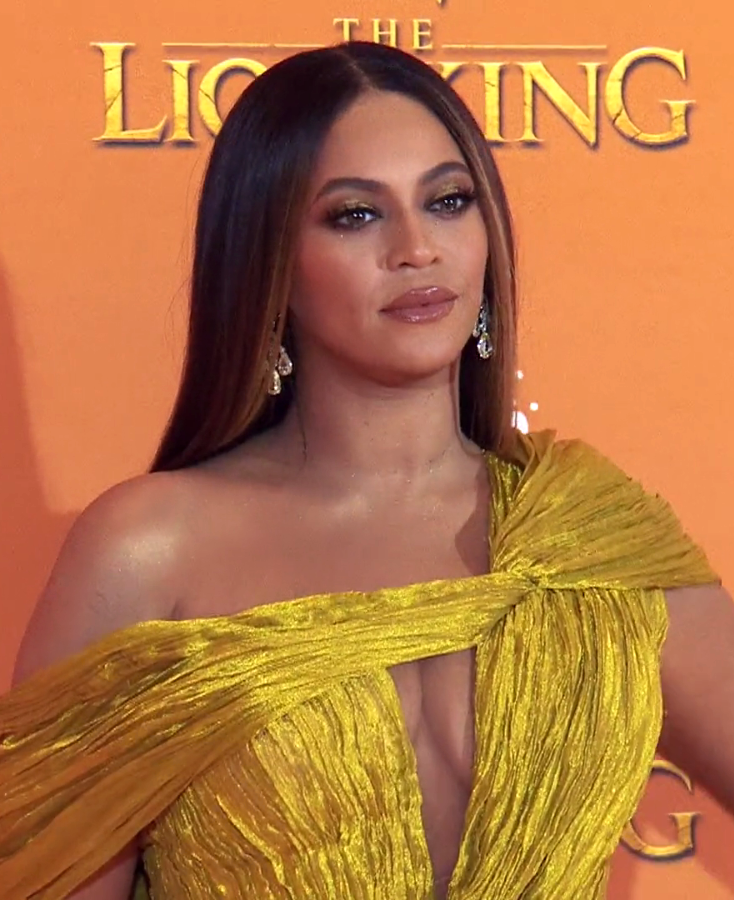
Beyoncé

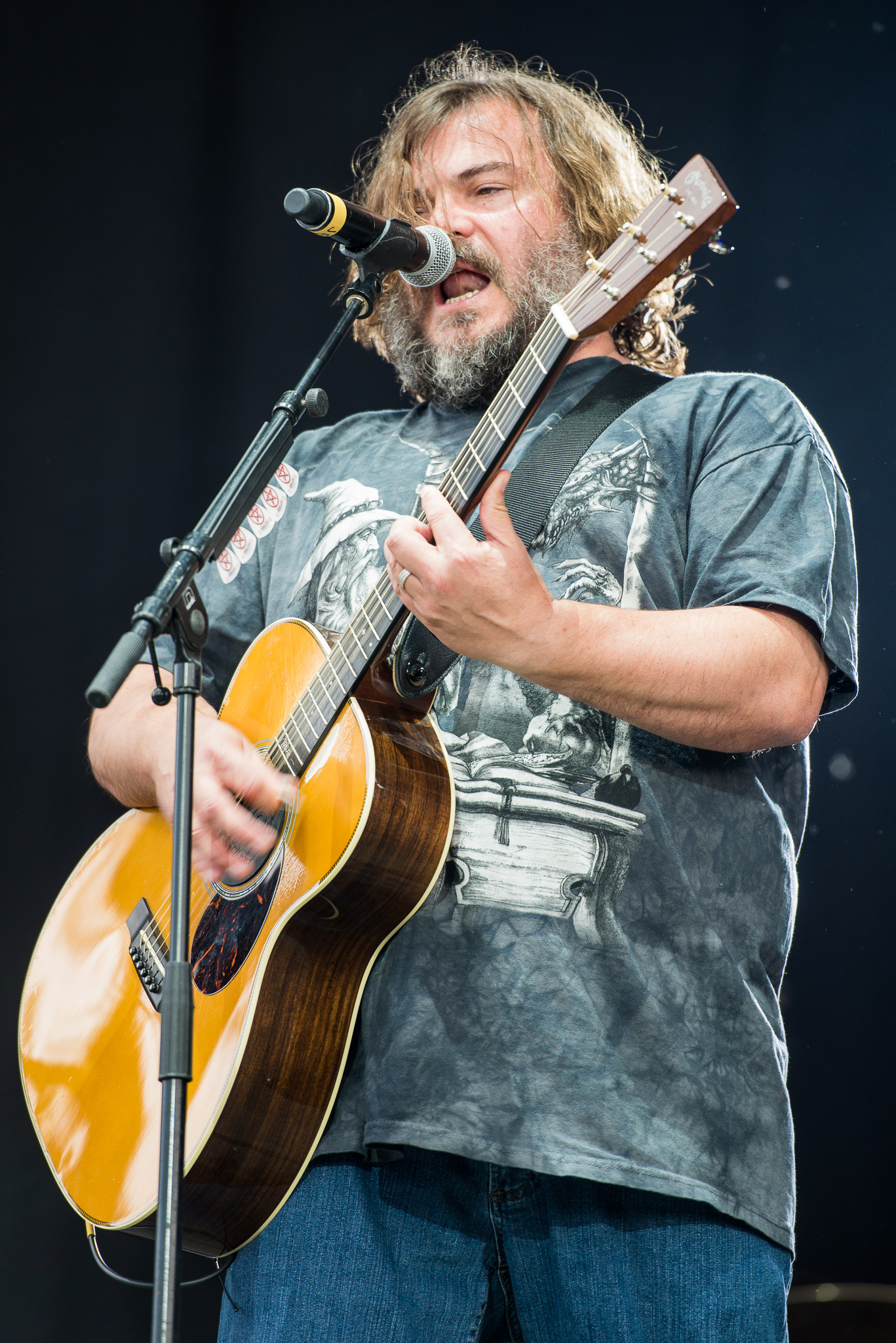
Jack Black

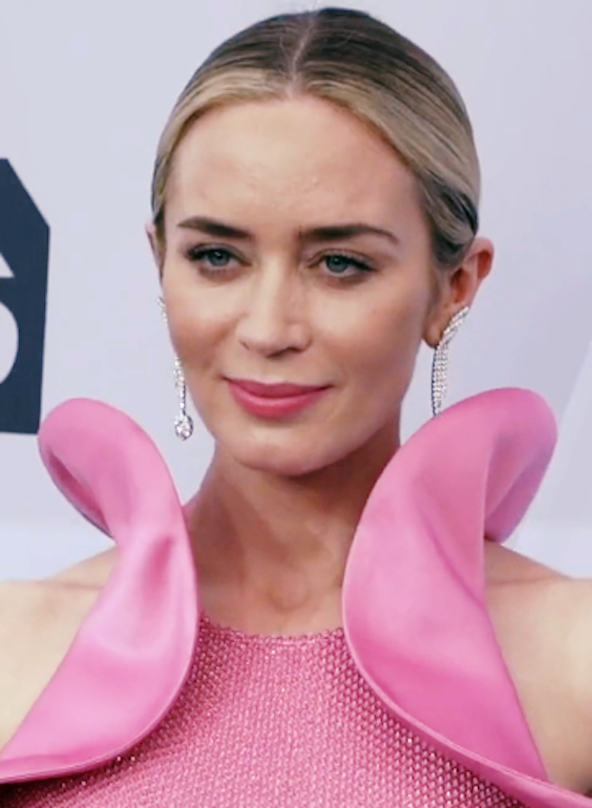
Emily Blunt

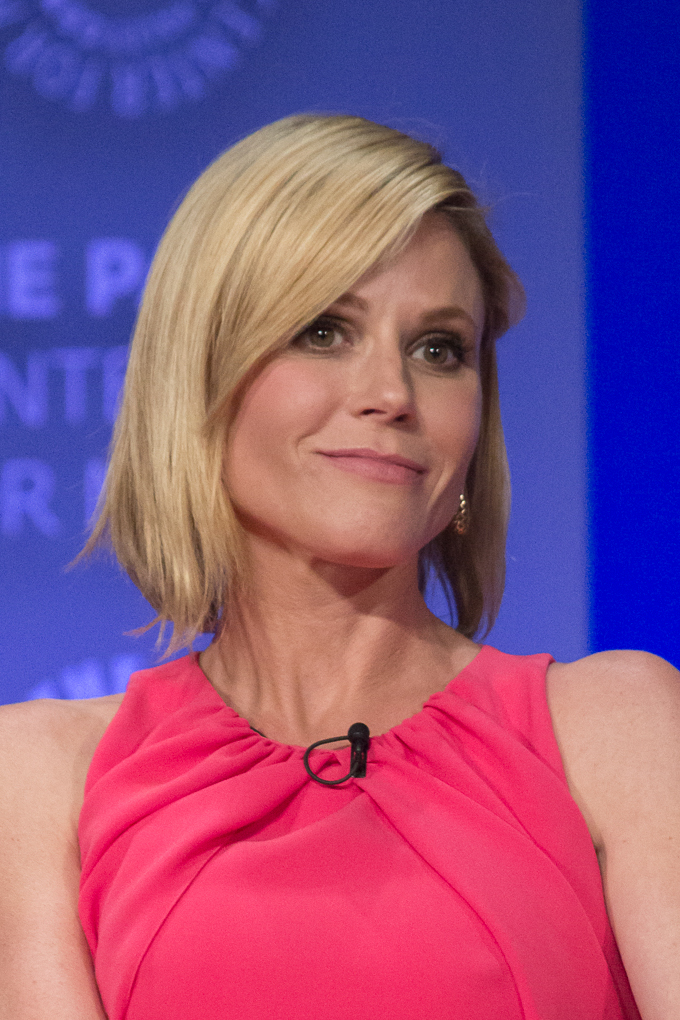
Julie Bowen

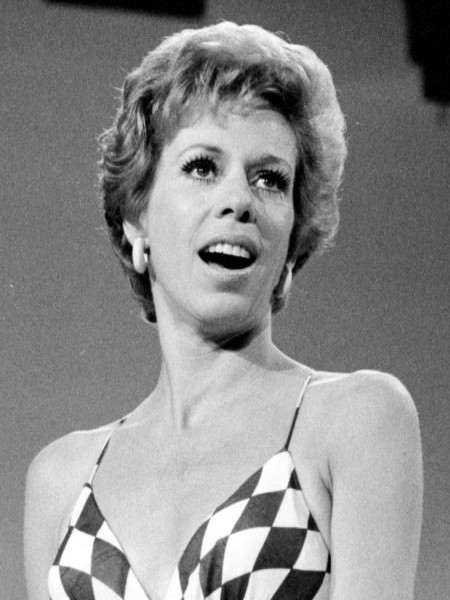
Carol Burnett

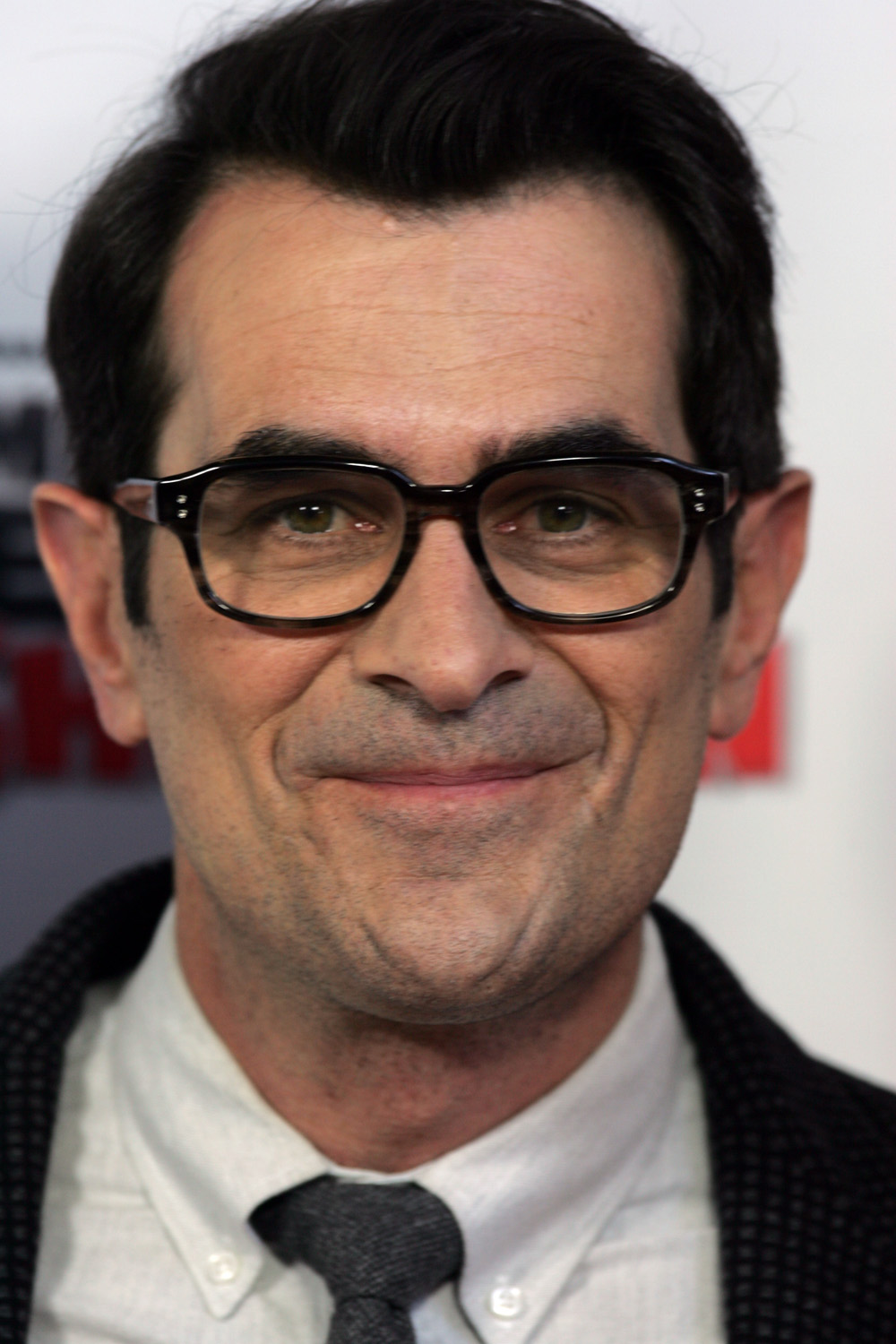
Ty Burrell
- Backstreet Boys sang "One Small Voice" with Elmo
- Erykah Badu
- Beetle Bailey appeared in a season 6 segment demonstrating "under"
- Alec Baldwin
- Carl Banks (one special): Banks, a New York Giants player, appeared during the celebrity performance of "Put Down the Duckie" in Put Down the Duckie: The Sesame Street Special
- Elizabeth Banks
- Tyra Banks acted out the word "struggle" and sang "The ABC Song" with Abby Cadabby (Note: This video was posted on YouTube, following the season finale)
- Tiki Barber defined "quest" and helped sing "Set Your Piggies Free"
- Sara Bareilles
- Dick Barnett for The New York Knicks
- Ray Barretto
- Todd Barry
- Jason Bateman discusses the word "comfort" with Elmo
- Jon Batiste
- Batman
- Keola Beamer
- Winona Beamer
- David Beckham acted out the word "persistent" with Elmo
- Samantha Bee
- Zazie Beetz
- Harry Belafonte
- Joshua Bell
- Kristen Bell defines the word "splatter" with Elmo and Abby Cadabby
- Regina Belle
- Richard Belzer appeared on the show and has a puppet that strongly resembles him
- Miri Ben-Ari
- Annette Bening
- Tony Bennett sings alphabet song
- George Benson
- Candice Bergen lip-synced "C is for cookie" in the early 1990s episode
- Corbin Bernsen
- Halle Berry presenting the word "nibble" with Elmo
- Beyoncé (lead singer of Destiny's Child) sings "A New Way to Walk"
- Jello Biafra
- Jill Biden
- Jason Biggs
- Aloe Blacc
- Jack Black discusses "octagon" and "disguise" with Elmo
- Tempestt Bledsoe
- Dan Blocker
- Emily Blunt as Arizona Emily defines the word "explore" with Idaho Elmo
- James Blunt (singing about triangles in episode 4144)
- Andrea Bocelli sang a lullaby to Elmo based on the song "Time to Say Goodbye"
- Lisa Bonet
- Aaron Boone
- Victor Borge (appeared in season 9)
- Julie Bowen discusses "binoculars" with Elmo
- Wayne Brady sings about "between"
- Zach Braff discusses "anxious" with Telly
- Benjamin Bratt demonstrates "translate" with Elmo
- Drew Brees discusses the word "measure" with Elmo
- Amy Brenneman
- Leon Bridges
- Brooklyn Tabernacle Choir
- Garth Brooks
- Alton Brown explains "recipe" with Abby Cadabby
- Blair Brown
- Chris Brown explains the word "disappear"; and sings "See the Signs" with Elmo (Note: Brown's song was pulled from broadcast due to his 2009 arrest)
- Downtown Julie Brown
- Quinta Brunson
- Kobe Bryant explaining the word "miniature" with Abby Cadabby
- Michael Bublé
- Buck 65 (one segment): The Canadian hip-hop artist performed a song called the "Grocery Store Rap" on the show
- Jimmy Buffett
- Steve Burns posted on Instagram with Oscar and Grover.
- Carol Burnett
- Ty Burrell discusses "hexagon" with Abby Cadabby; and shows Elmo "hide and seek"
- Barbara Bush
- Laura Bush (one segment): In episode 4032, the First Lady reads an original book called Wubba Wubba Wubba to Elmo, Big Bird, and some children. Bush has also appeared on international adaptation of the series Alam Simsim in Egypt and Galli Galli Sim Sim in India.
- Reggie Bush discussed the word "appetite" in Music Magic
- Daws Butler
- Kerry Butler
- Eugene Byrd

== C ==
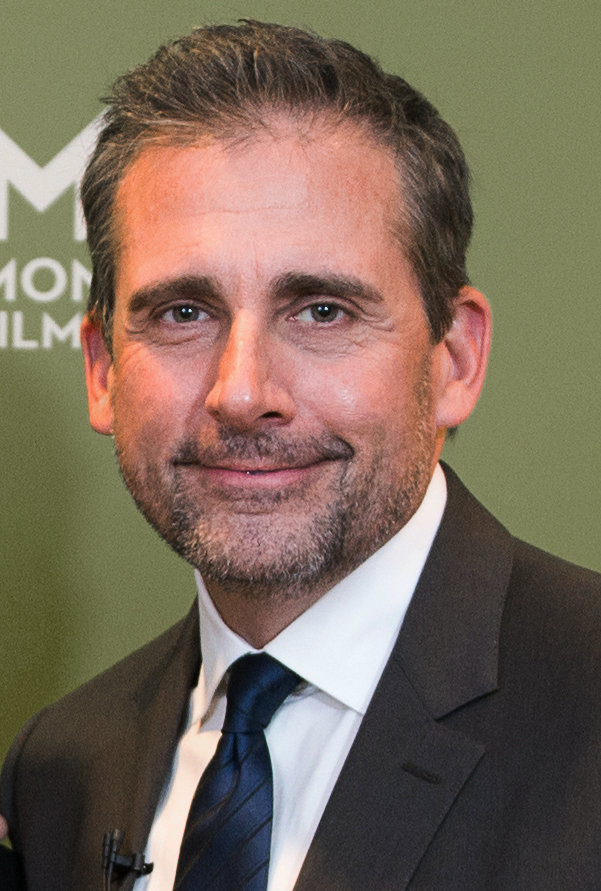
Steve Carell

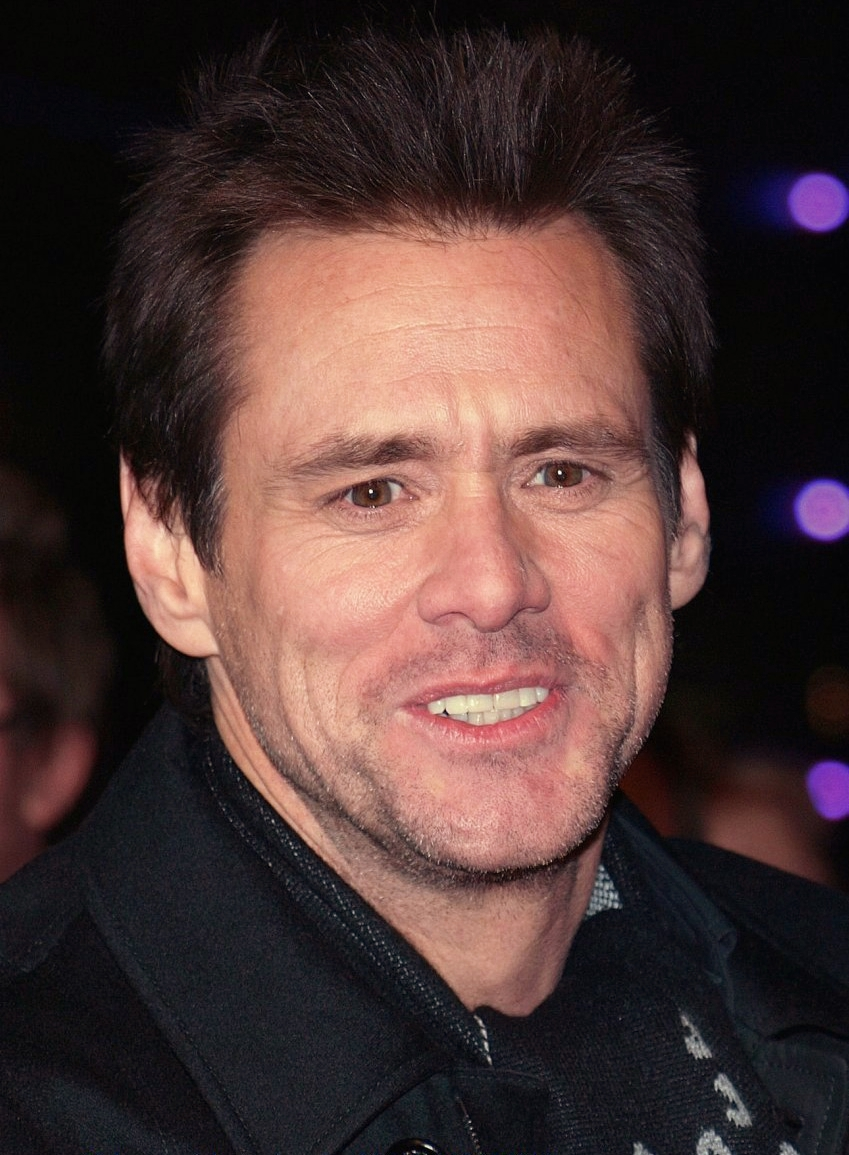
Jim Carrey

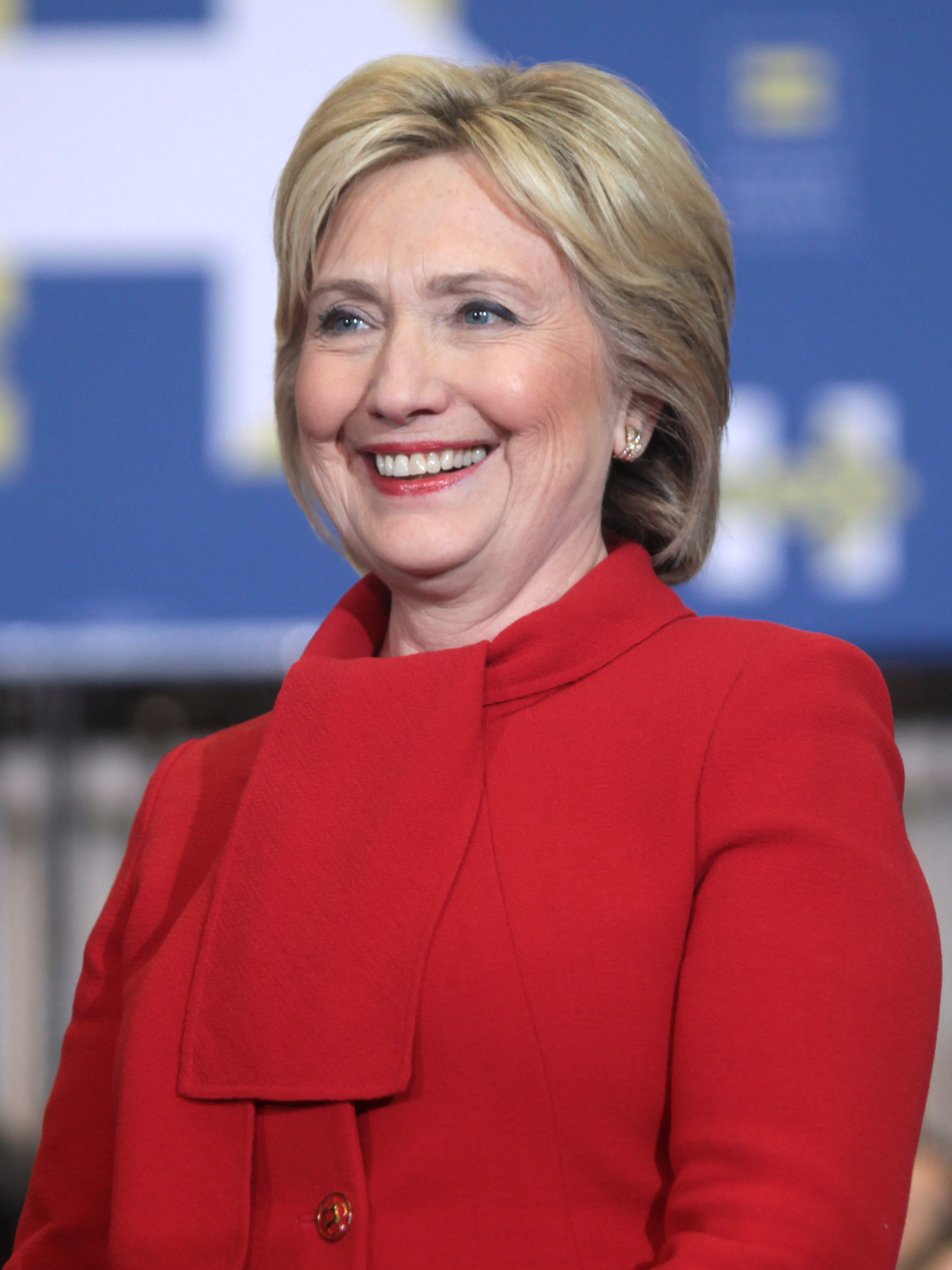
Hillary Clinton

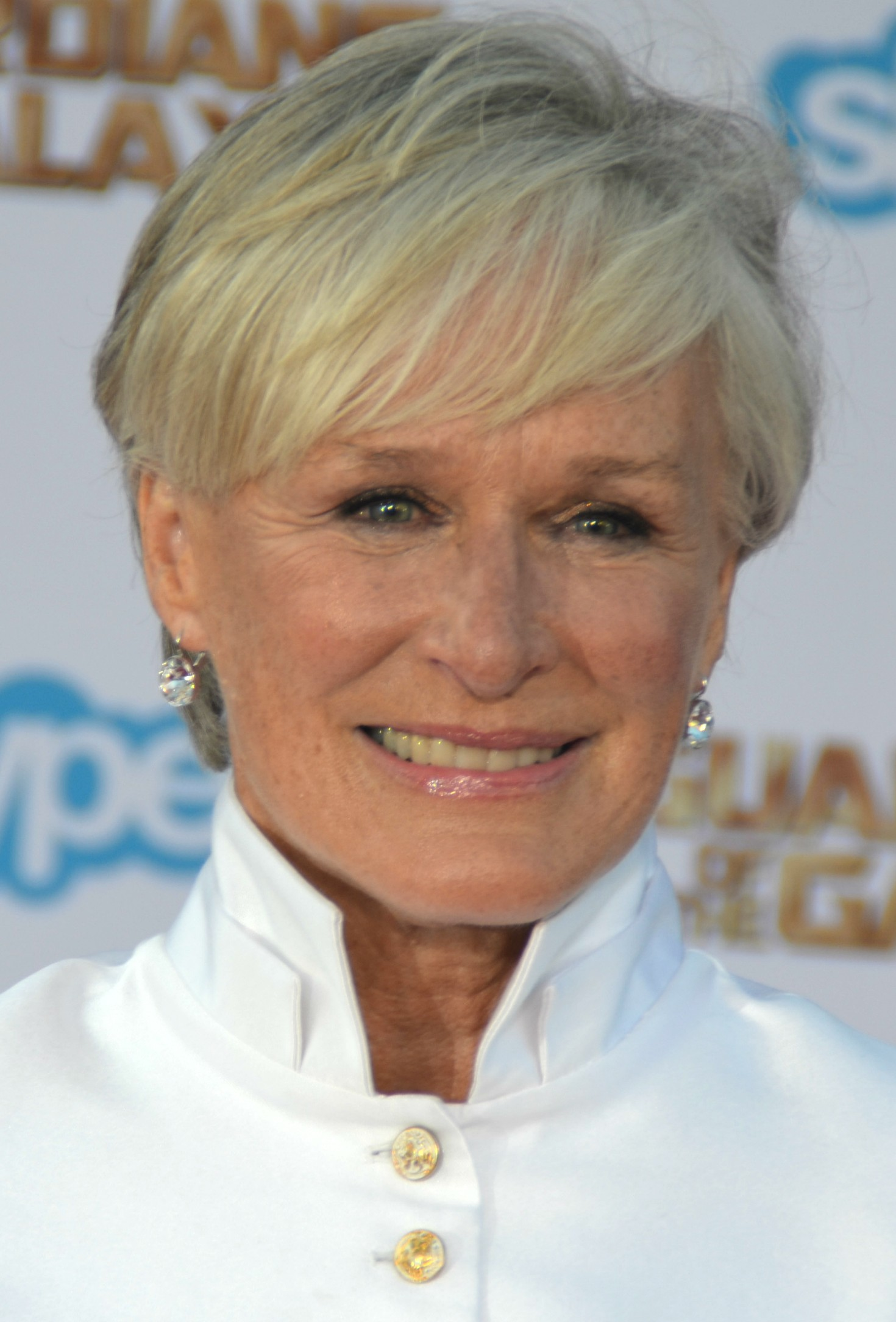
Glenn Close

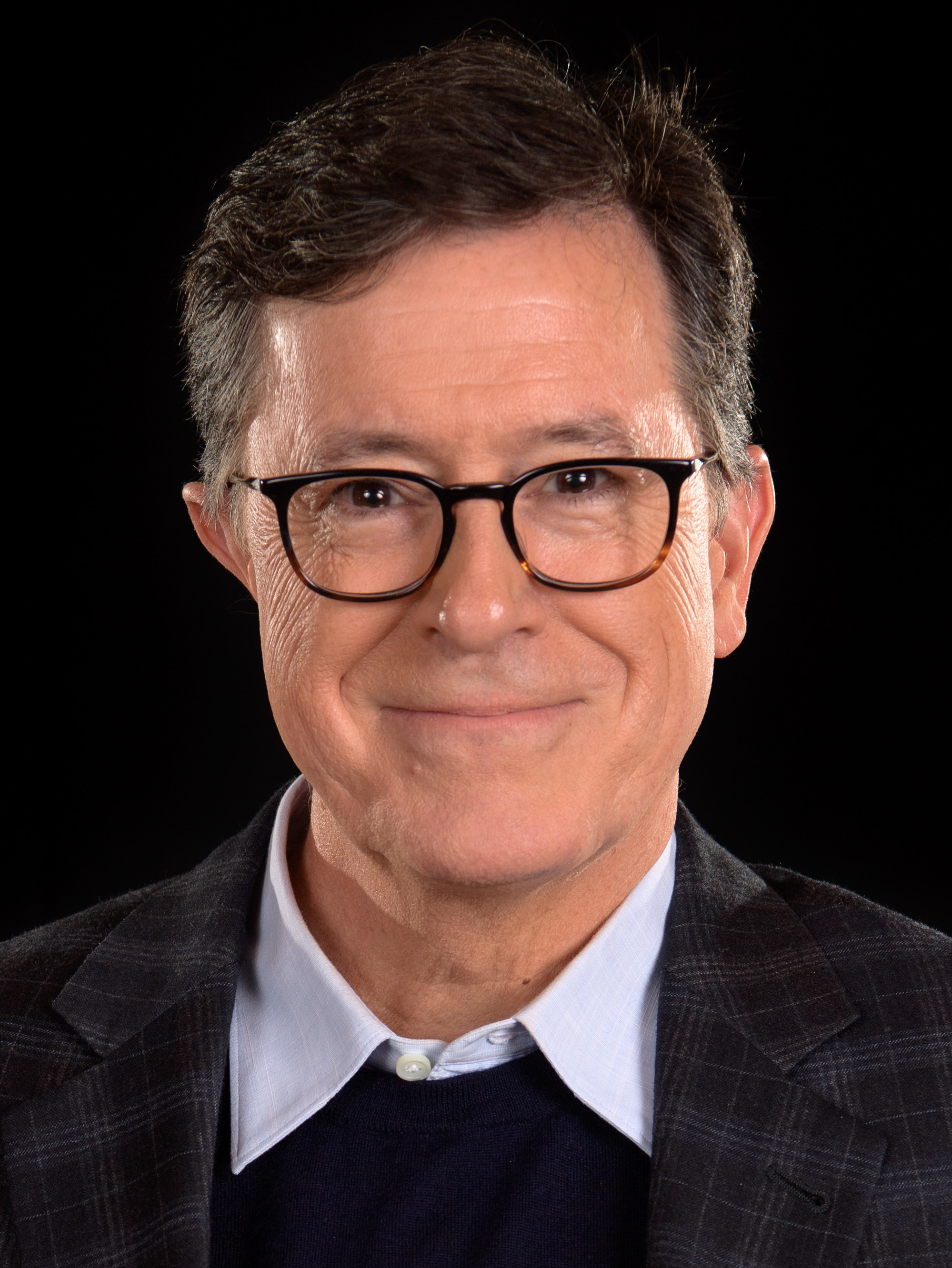
Stephen Colbert

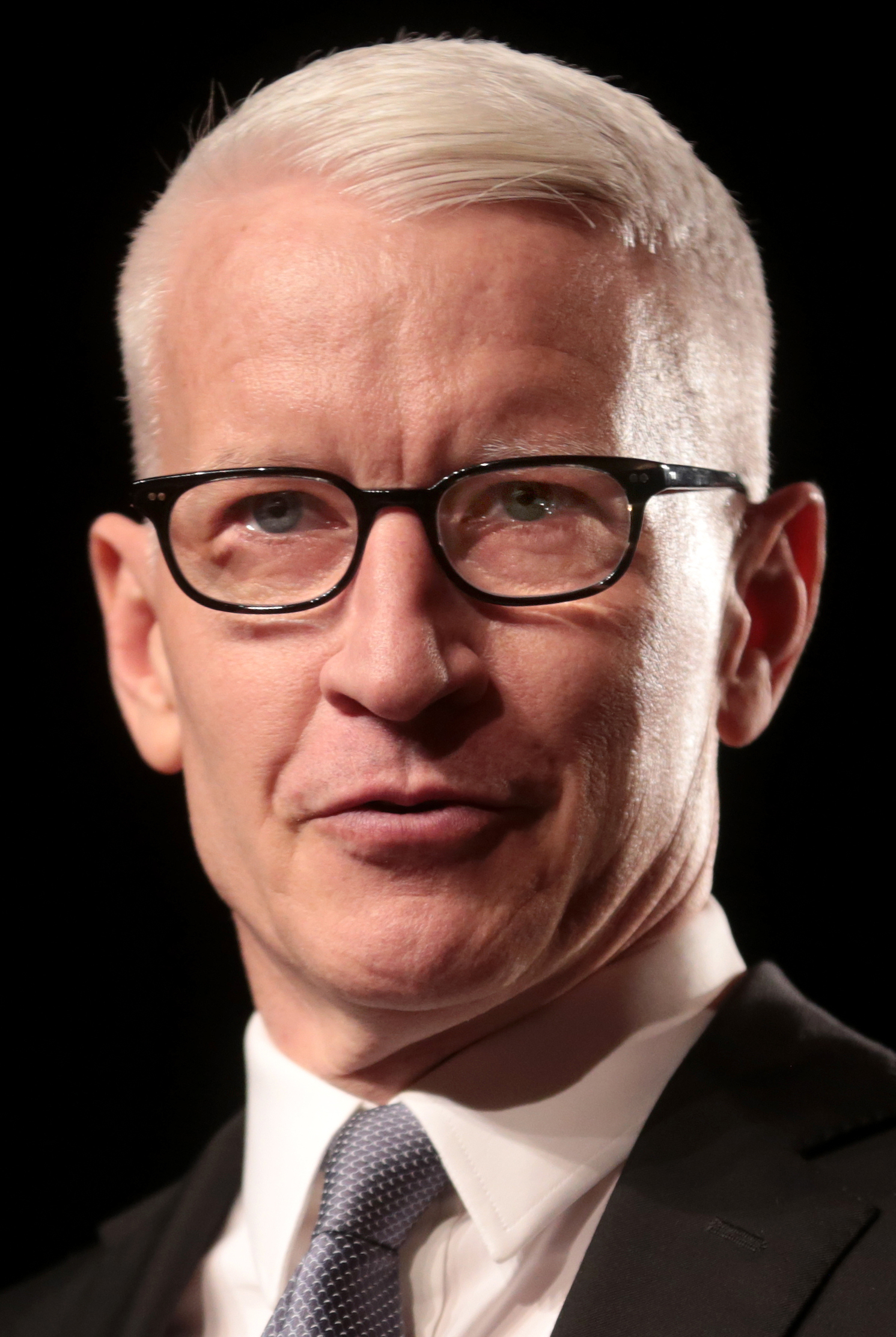
Anderson Cooper

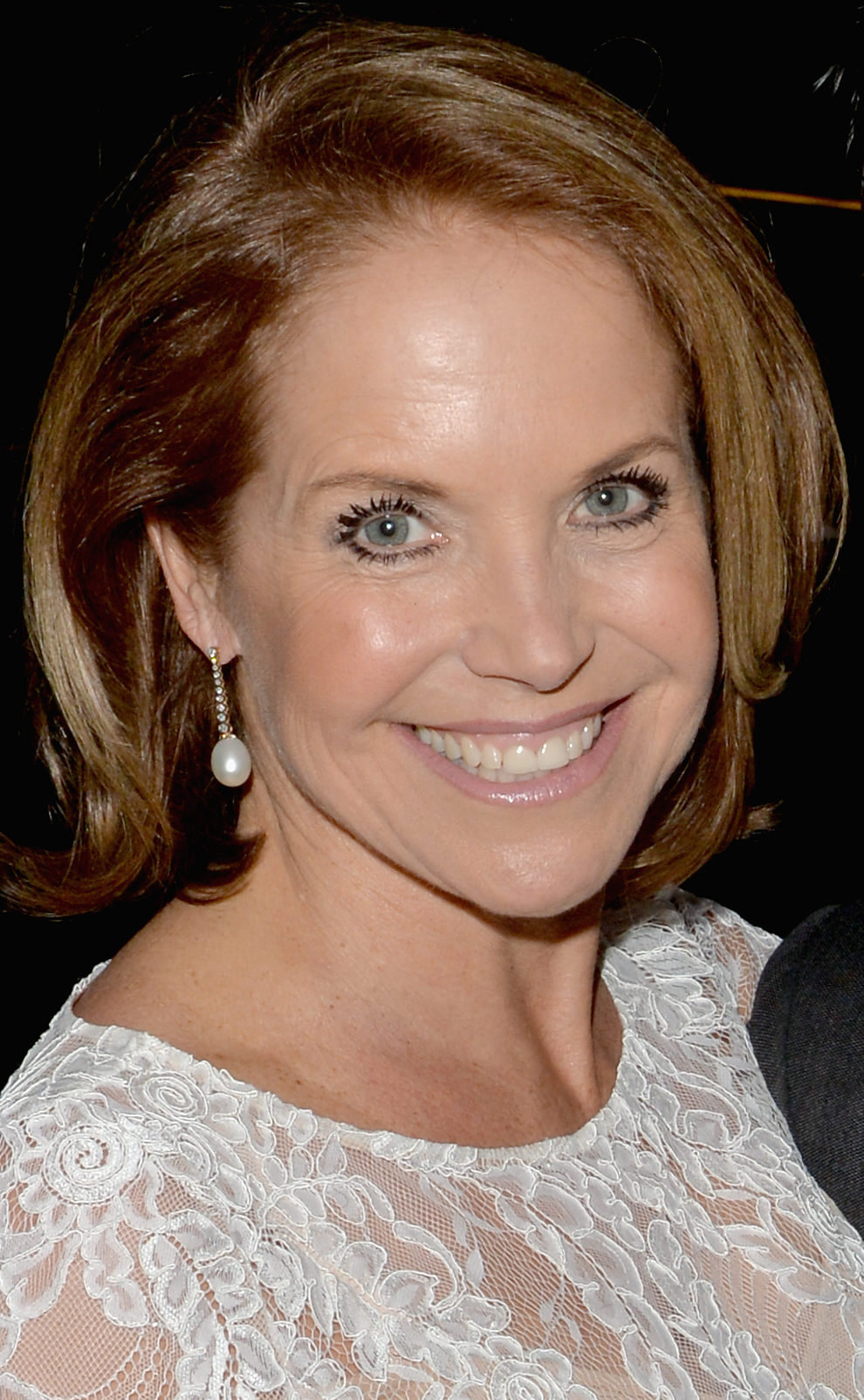
Katie Couric

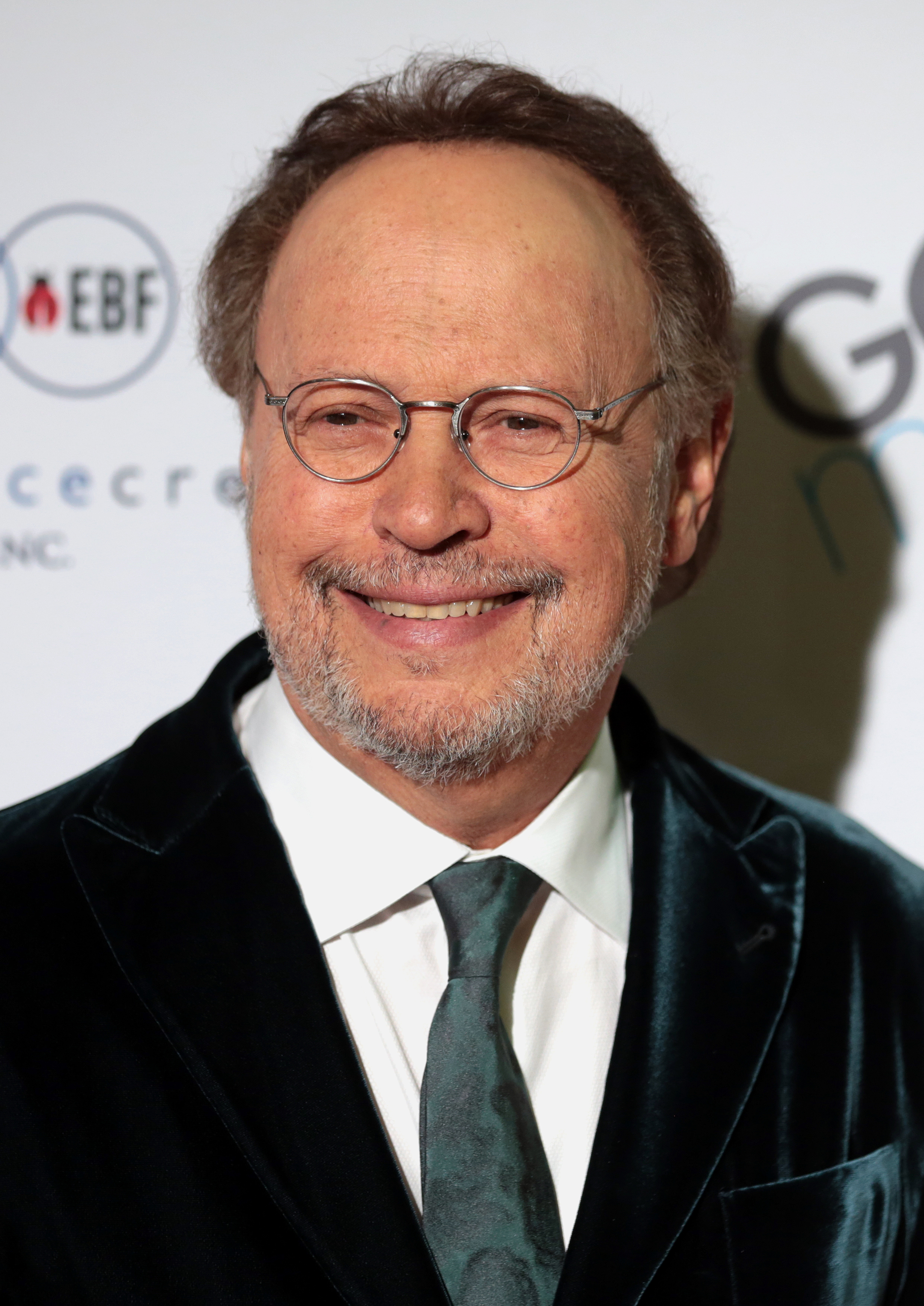
Billy Crystal

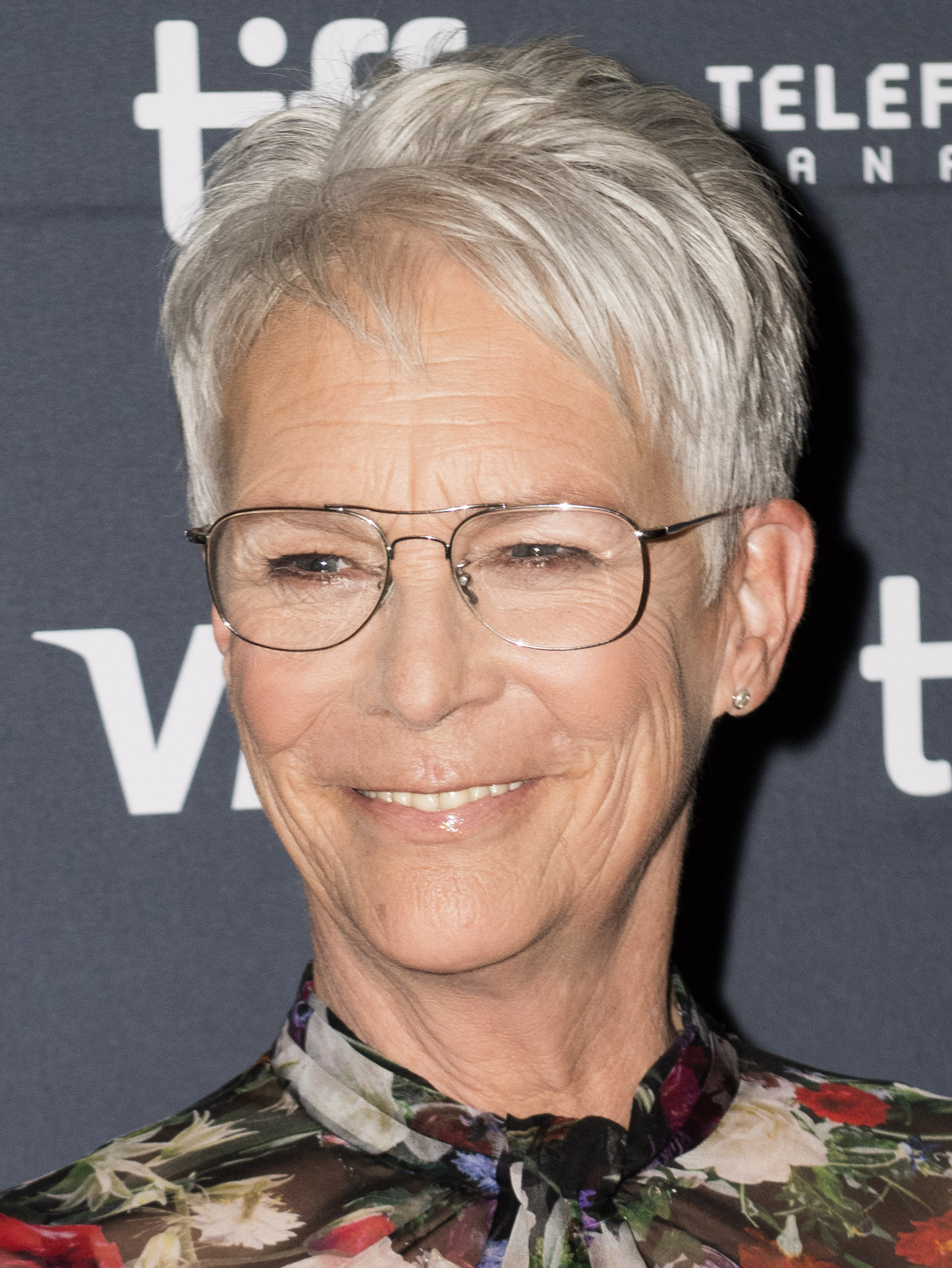
Jamie Lee Curtis
- C-3PO explains to R2-D2 that the thing he is in love with is a fire hydrant in episode 1396. "It is better to have loved a fire hydrant than never to have loved at all." (This was their second appearance; the first was in episode 1364)
- Sid Caesar
- Colbie Caillat
- Fernando Caldeiro
- Cab Calloway (appeared in several segments in season 12)
- Canadian Brass
- John Candy (appeared as his Yosh Shmenge character from SCTV, but the segment was pulled after its initial airing due to complaints from Polish groups. He also made an appearance as Shmenge in "Sesame Street, Special".)
- Mary Chapin Carpenter
- Steve Carell demonstrates the word "vote" with Elmo and Abby Cadabby
- Brandi Carlile
- José Carreras
- Jim Carrey
- Aaron and Nick Carter teach Elmo about siblings
- Vince Carter
- Nancy Cartwright (as Bart Simpson)
- Johnny Cash sang "Nasty Dan" with Oscar
- Dan Castellaneta (as Homer Simpson)
- Phoebe Cates
- Kim Cattrall defines the word "fabulous" for Abby Cadabby in episode 4162
- Henry Cavill defines the word "respect" with Elmo
- Cedric the Entertainer demonstrates the word "canteen" with Abby Cadabby
- Carol Channing
- Stockard Channing
- Chance the Rapper
- Tracy Chapman
- Ray Charles sings alphabet song
- Don Cheadle demonstrates "inflate" with Elmo
- Kristin Chenoweth
- The Chicks sing about the letter B
- Kelly Clarkson
- John Cho defines "sturdy" with Abby Cadabby
- Margaret Cho
- Hillary Clinton
- Rosemary Clooney
- Chuck Close (appeared in season 32 to demonstrate pointillism)
- Glenn Close
- Bill Cobbs
- Imogene Coca
- Andy Cohen describes the word "popular" with Elmo
- Stephen Colbert as the letter Z in Sesame Street's All Star Alphabet
- Laveranues Coles (one segment): Coles, a New York Jets player, appeared in season 38 (2007), along with other Jets, Elmo, and Elmo's goldfish Dorothy
- Judy Collins
- Shawn Colvin sings "I Don't Want to Live on the Moon" with Ernie
- Common
- Harry Connick Jr.
- Tim Conway (appeared in season 2 in short segments)
- Anderson Cooper appeared on GNN to discuss the letter G
- Misty Copeland
- Alex Cora
- Angel Corella
- Bill Cosby (also hosted the 20th anniversary special)
- Elvis Costello
- Katie Couric
- Cindy Crawford
- Terry Crews demonstrates the word "artist" with Abby Cadabby and Count von Count
- Sheryl Crow
- Celia Cruz
- Billy Crystal
- Alan Cumming
- Ann Curry defines the word "apology" in episode 4151
- Stephen Curry and Ayesha Curry
- Jane Curtin (played Cinderella in a season 16 episode, also appeared in "Sesame Street, Special")
- Jamie Lee Curtis
- Joan Cusack
- Miley Cyrus singing "Just Imagine" in Episode 5605

== D ==
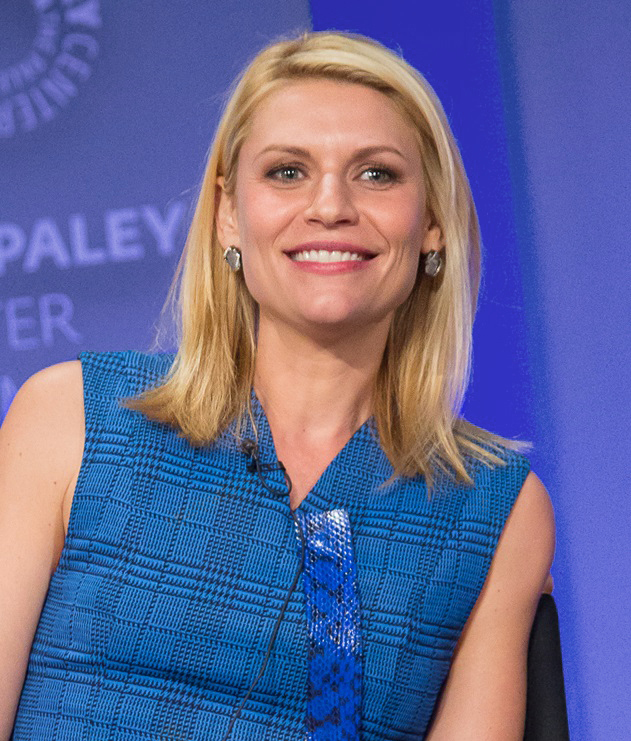
Claire Danes

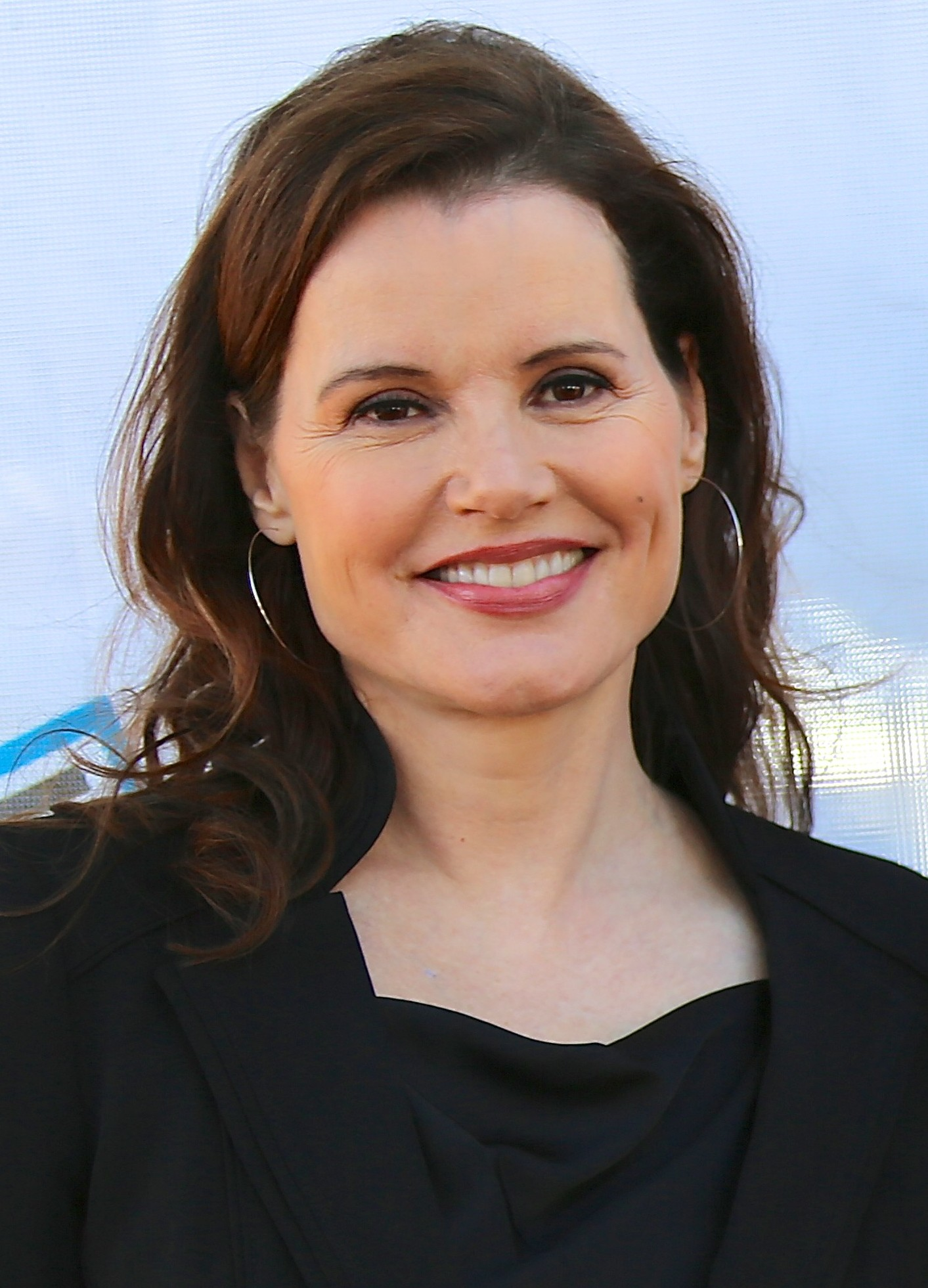
Geena Davis

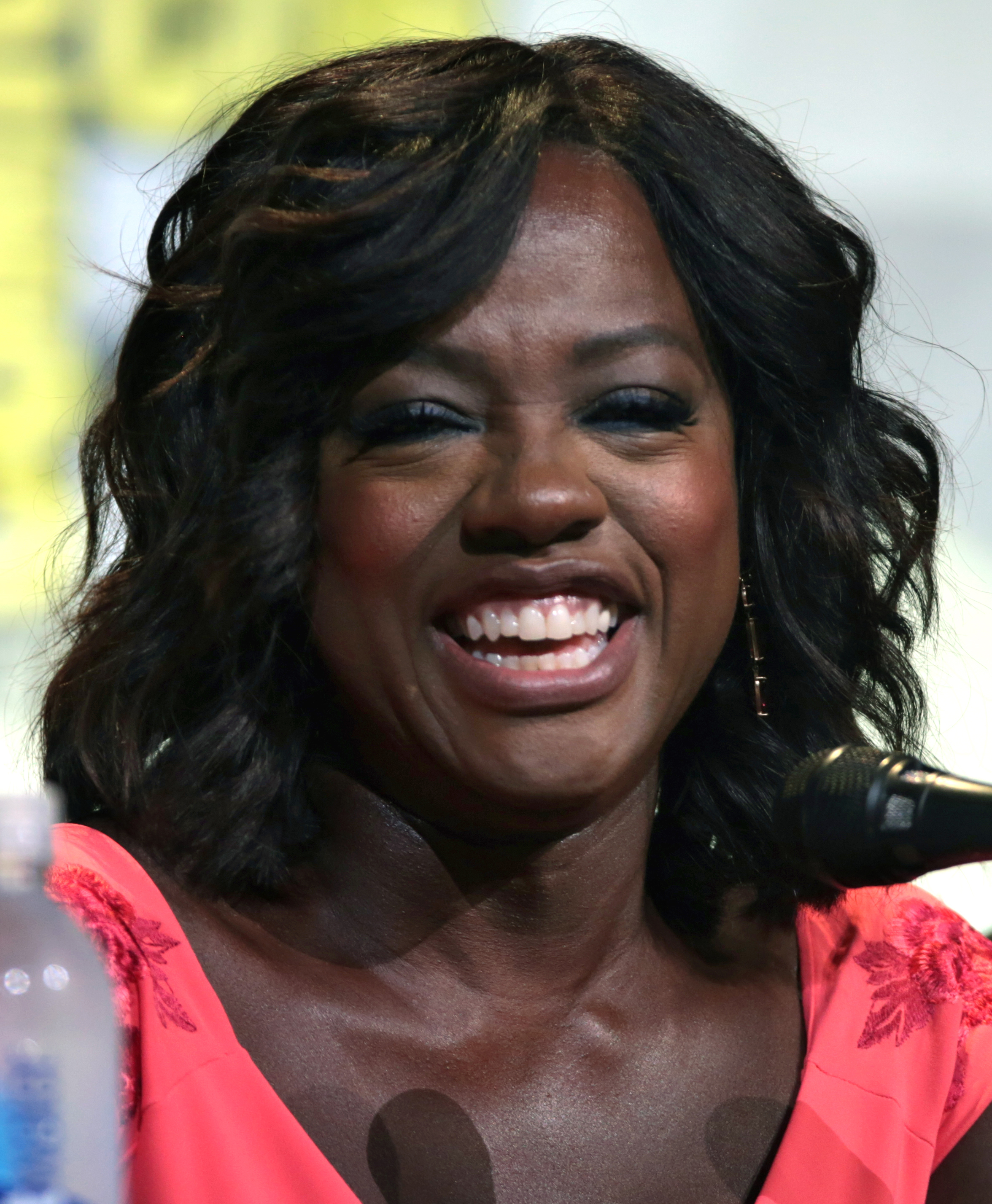
Viola Davis

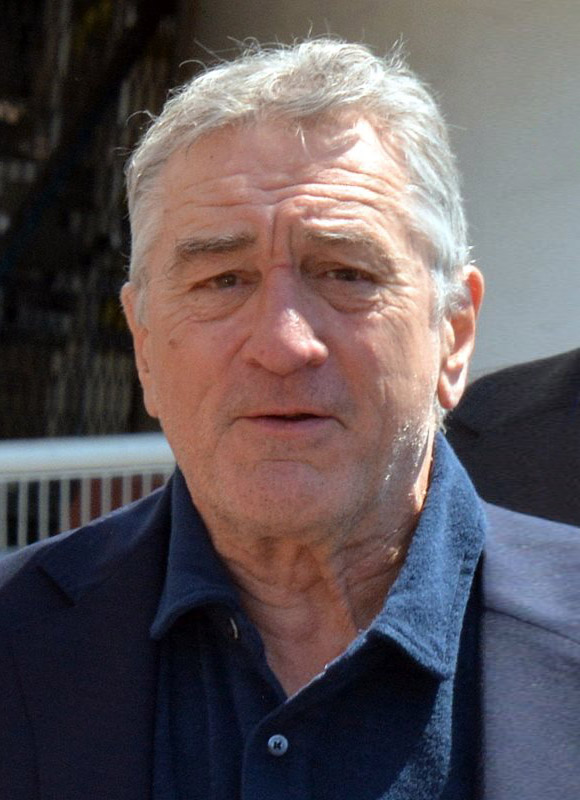
Robert De Niro

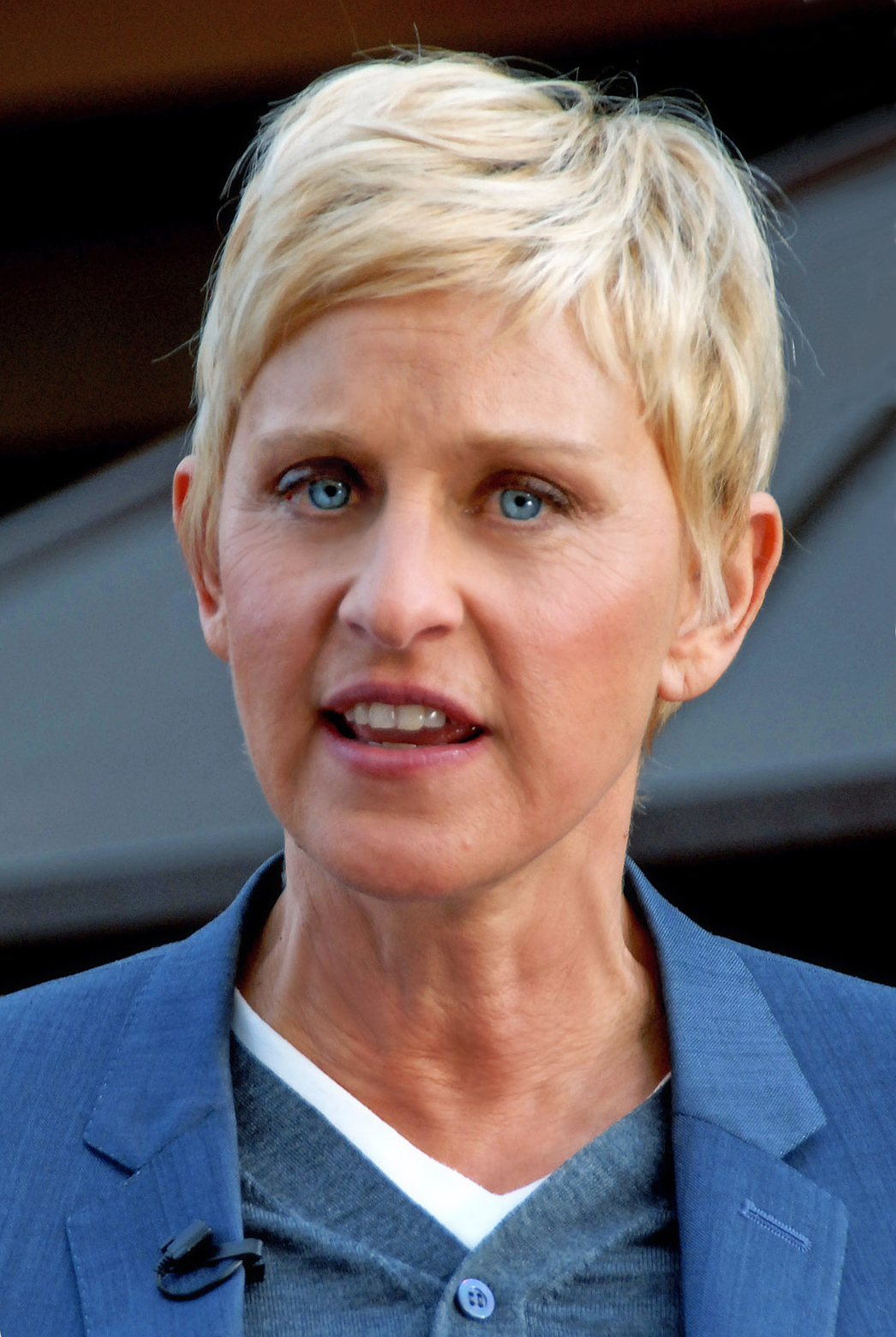
Ellen DeGeneres

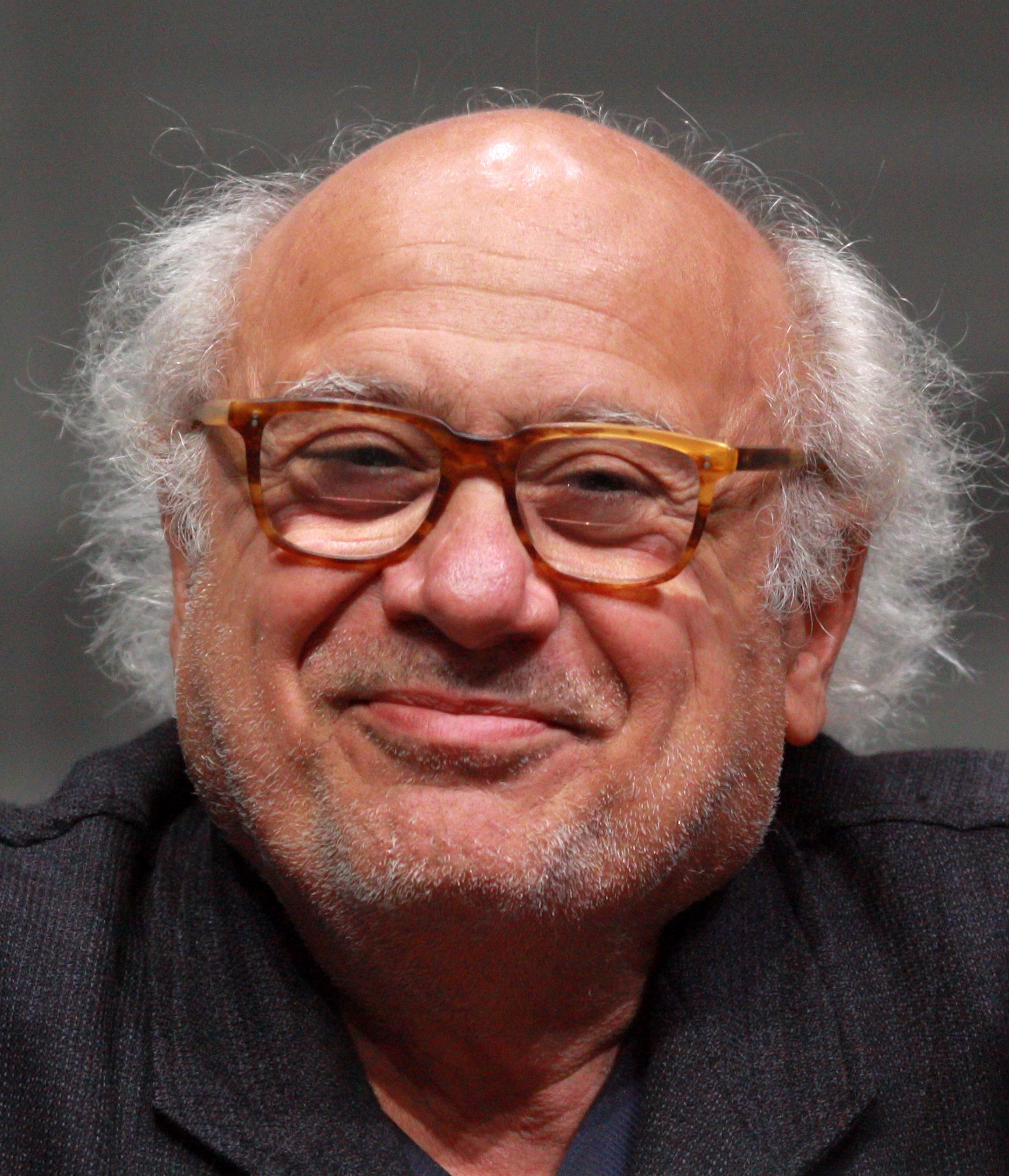
Danny DeVito

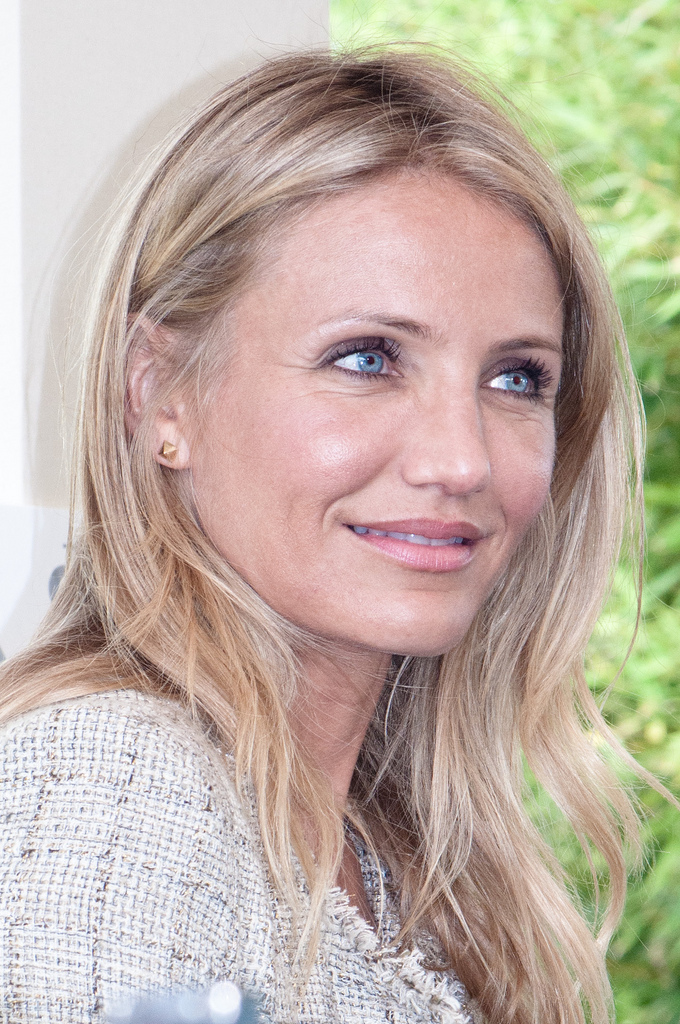
Cameron Diaz

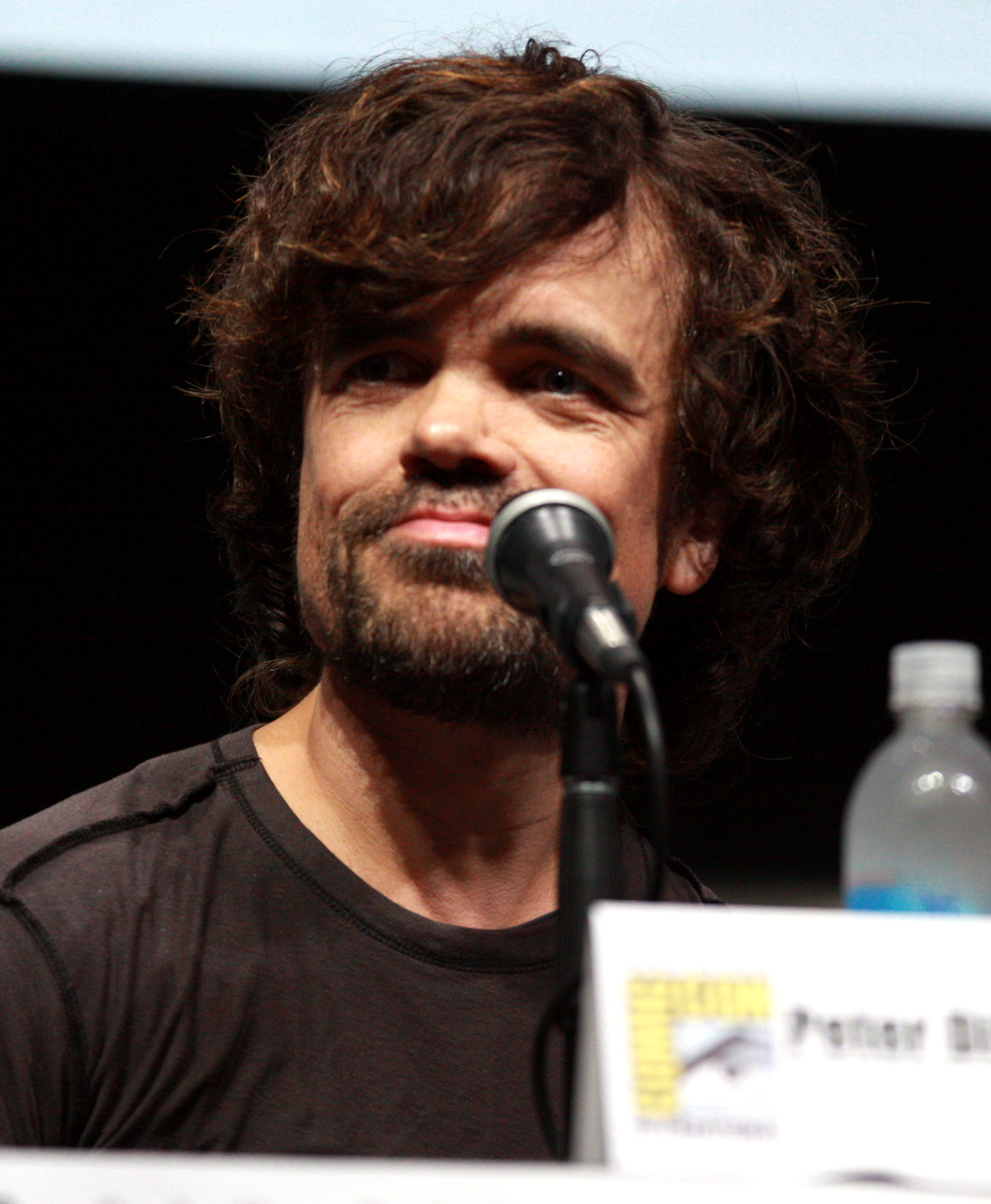
Peter Dinklage

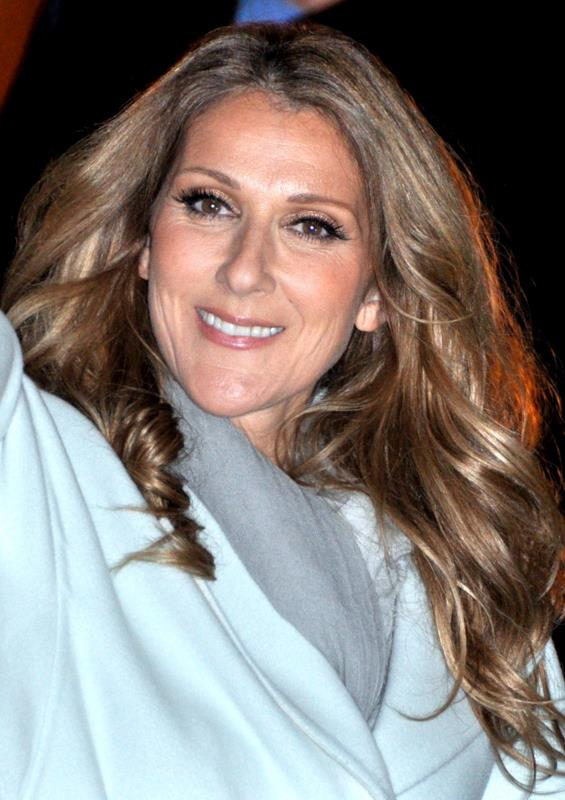
Celine Dion
- Kevin Daley for the Harlem Globetrotters
- Tyne Daly
- Dance Theatre of Harlem
- Claire Danes demonstrates the word "diagram" with Cookie Monster
- Anthony Daniels
- Tony Danza
- Ron Darling
- Geena Davis
- Michael Davis juggled foods, a bowling ball, and trash across the street in episode 1959, as well as juggling Oscar's pets; he was thought to be imaginary by Big Bird.
- Terrell Davis
- Tyrone Davis
- Viola Davis defines the word "fiesta" with Elmo
- Dominique Dawes
- Richard Dawson appeared as host of "Family Food", a takeoff on his Family Feud game show
- Robert De Niro explains what an 'actor' is to Elmo; he turns into a dog, a cabbage, and Elmo
- The Deadly Nightshade
- Ariana DeBose
- Ruby Dee
- Ellen DeGeneres sings alphabet song and talks about the word "ballet"
- Kat Dennings defines the word "repair" with Abby Cadabby
- Jason Derulo
- Danny DeVito
- Charlotte Diamond sings 'La Bastrangue', 'I am a Pizza' and 'Slippery Fish' on "Canadian Sesame Street"
- Cameron Diaz defines the word "tree" with Grover, explains "habitat" with the help of the Muppet animals, and sings along in "Set Your Piggies Free"
- Bo Diddley
- Daveed Diggs
- Taye Diggs (with Idina Menzel) explain the word "allergic"
- David Dinkins
- Peter Dinklage
- Kara DioGuardi defines "pasta" with Elmo
- Celine Dion performs one song on "Elmopalooza!"
- Plácido Domingo (also parodied on the show as "Placido Flamingo")
- Phil Donahue
- Doug E. Doug (played Baby Bear's barber in a season 30 episode)
- Brian Doyle-Murray
- Rachel Dratch
- Fran Drescher (appeared with Baby Natasha in a season 30 sketch)
- Gustavo Dudamel demonstrates "stupendous" with Elmo
- Ava DuVernay

== E ==
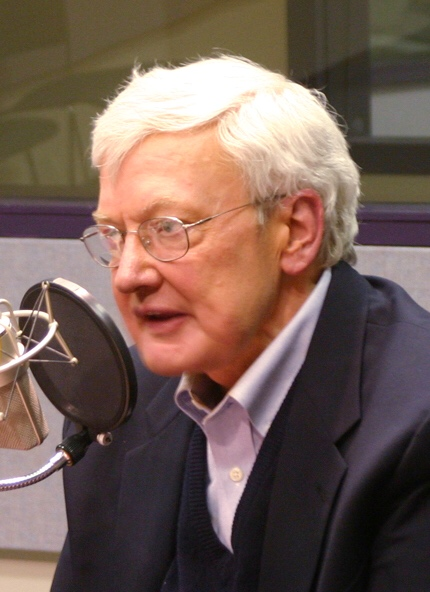
Roger Ebert

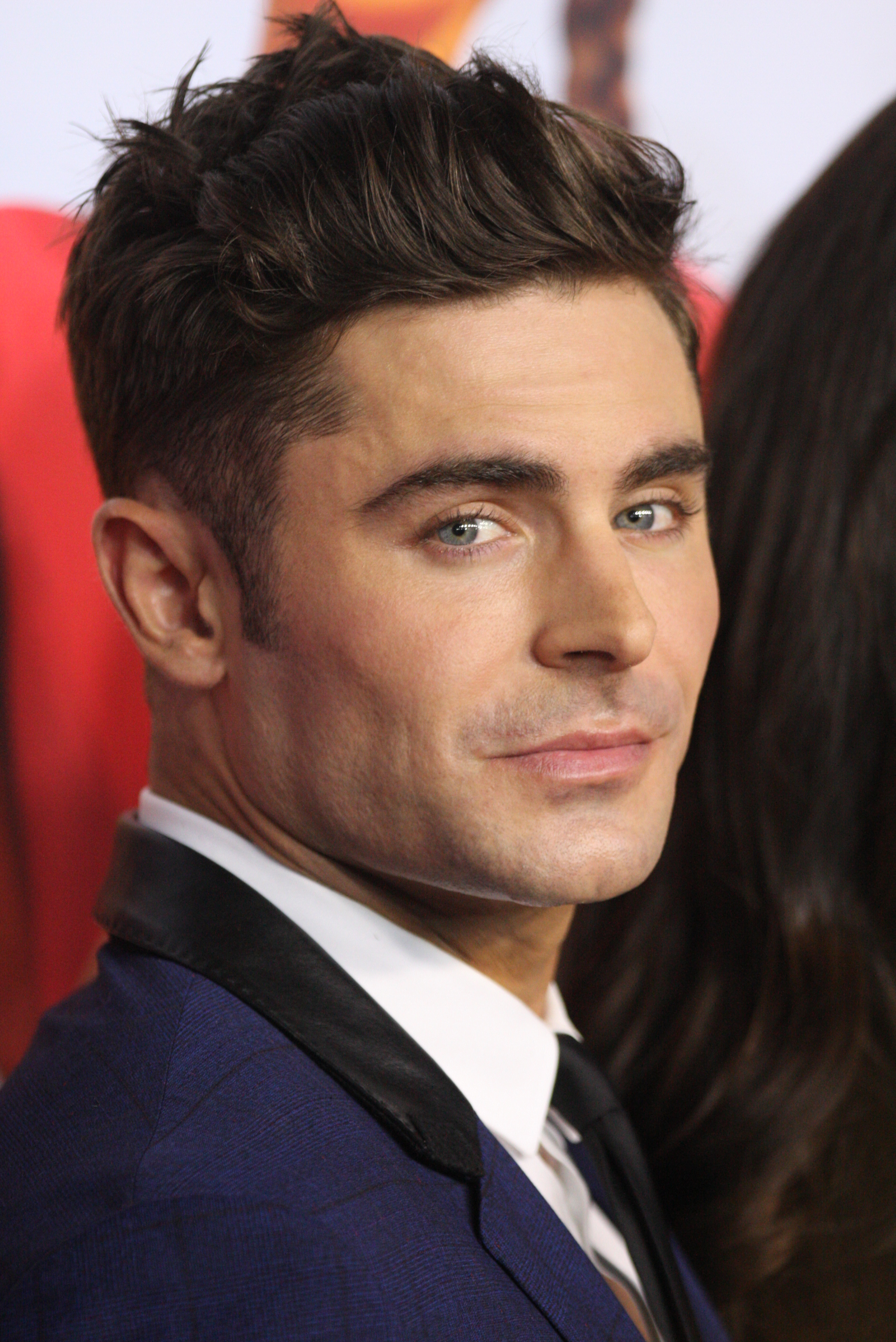
Zac Efron

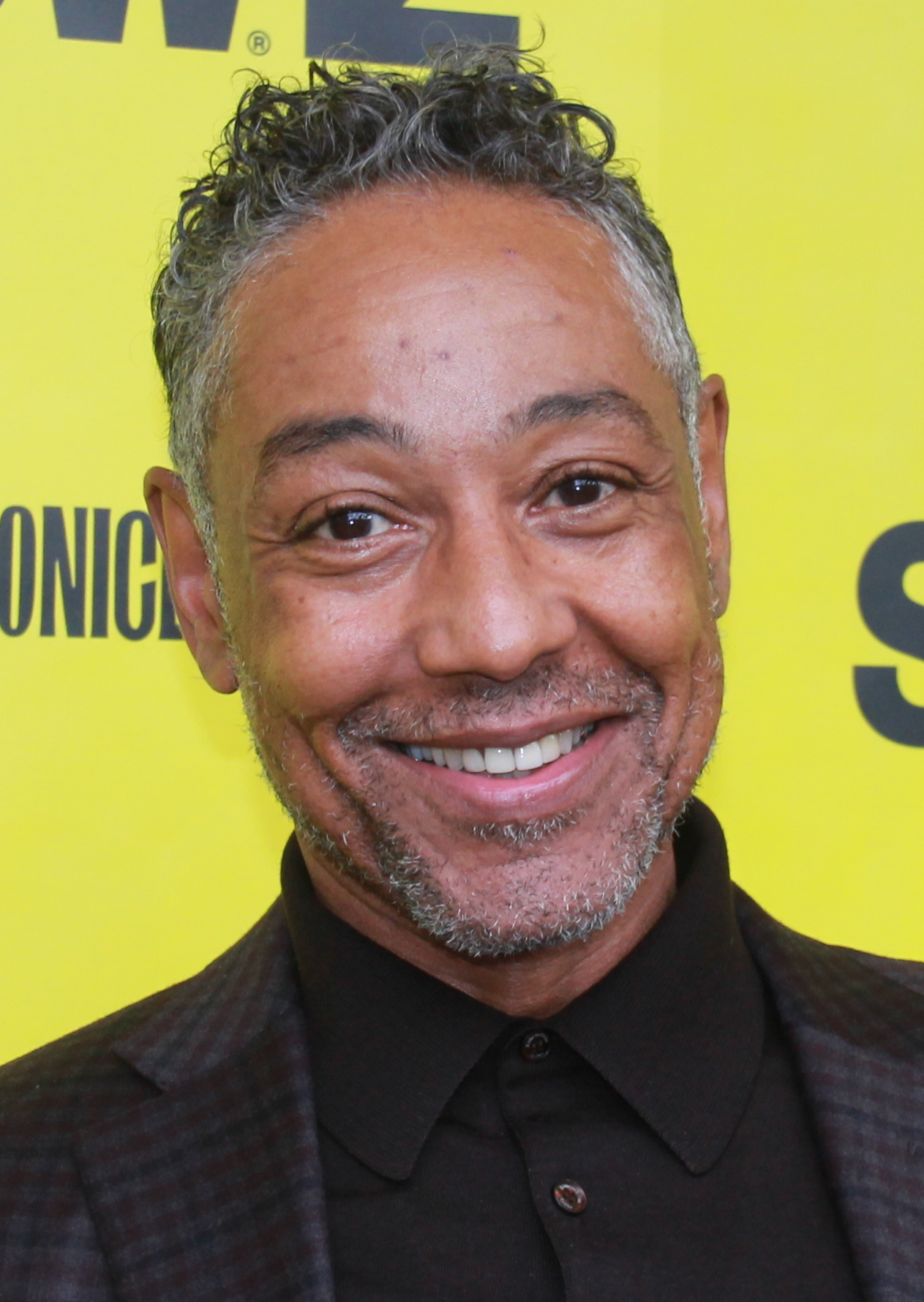
Giancarlo Esposito

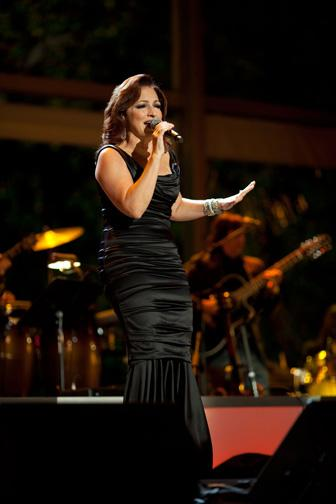
Gloria Estefan
- Roger Ebert (appeared along with longtime screen partner Gene Siskel in season 22)
- Zac Efron defines the word "patience" with Elmo
- Billie Eilish
- En Vogue
- Julius Erving
- Giancarlo Esposito portrayed Mickey, Big Bird's camp counselor in episodes 1706–1710
- Gloria Estefan
- Melissa Etheridge

== F ==
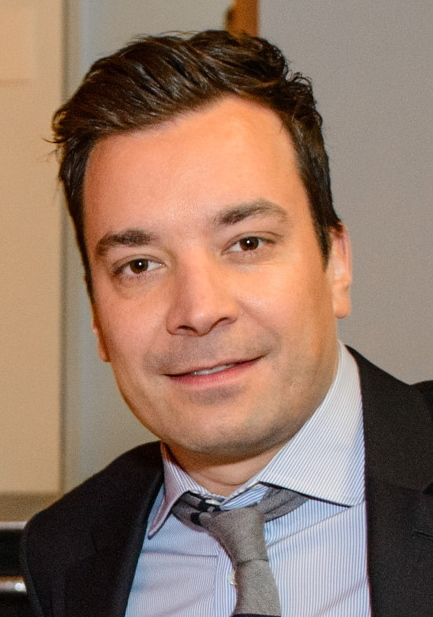
Jimmy Fallon

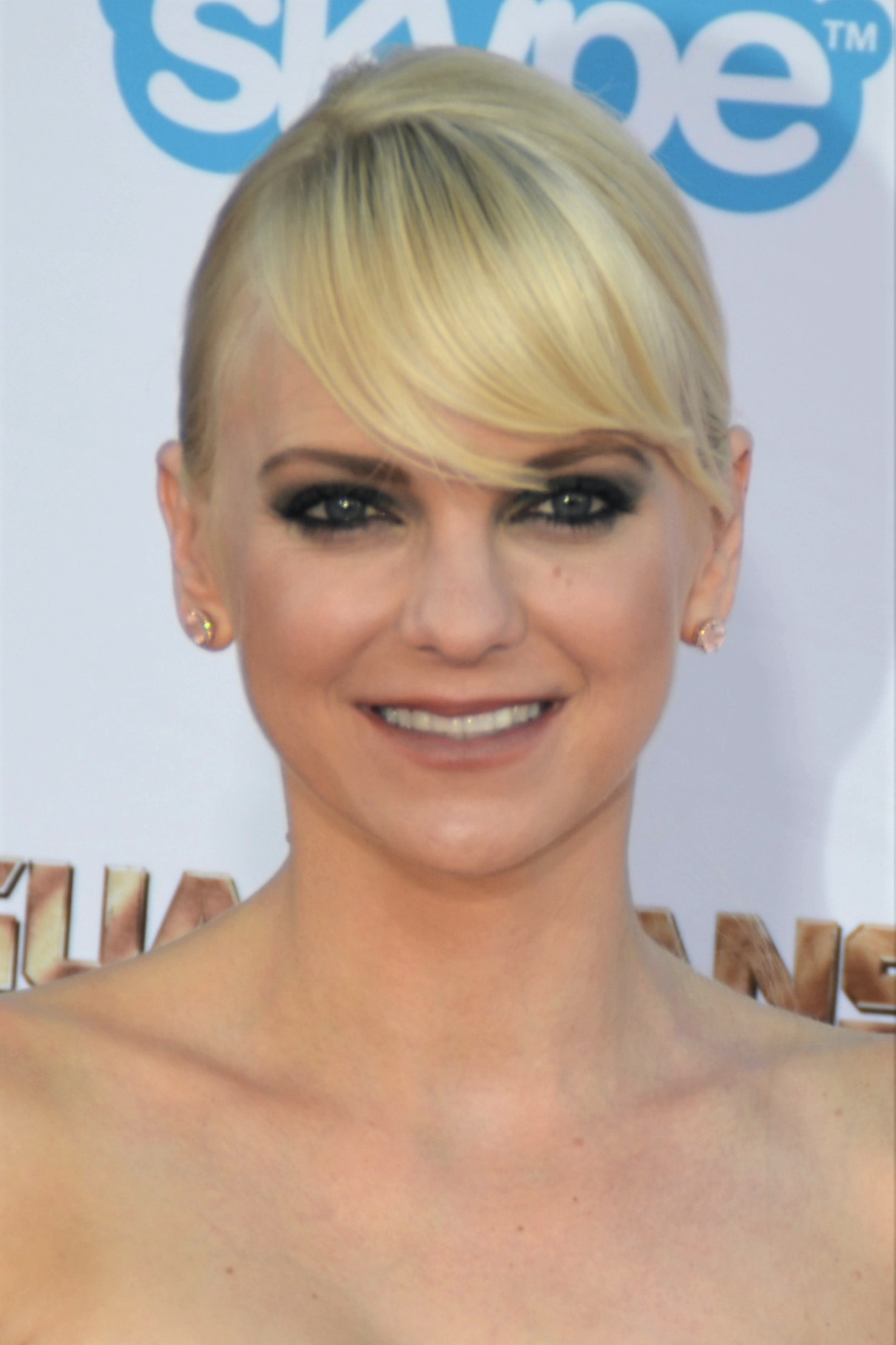
Anna Faris

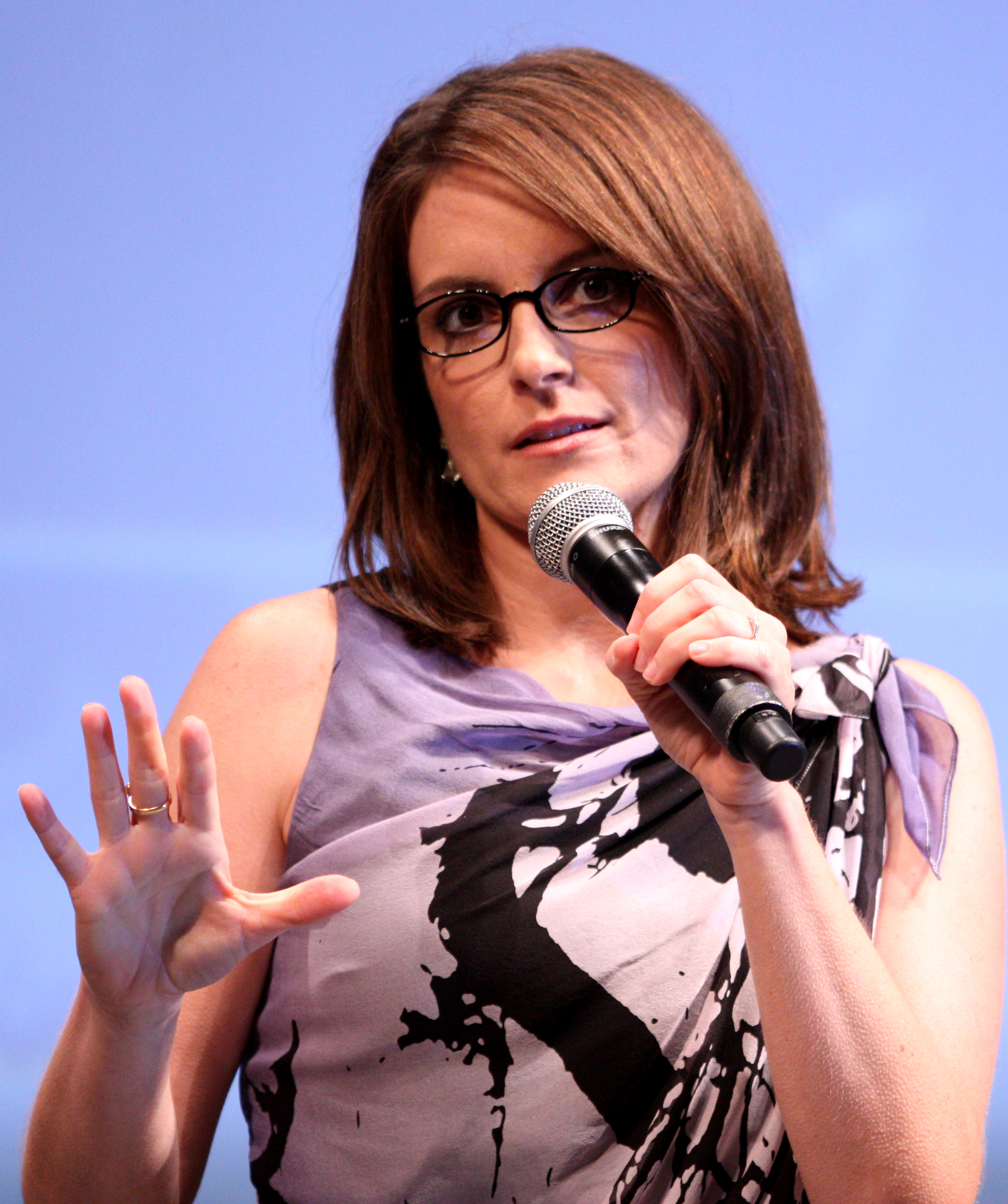
Tina Fey

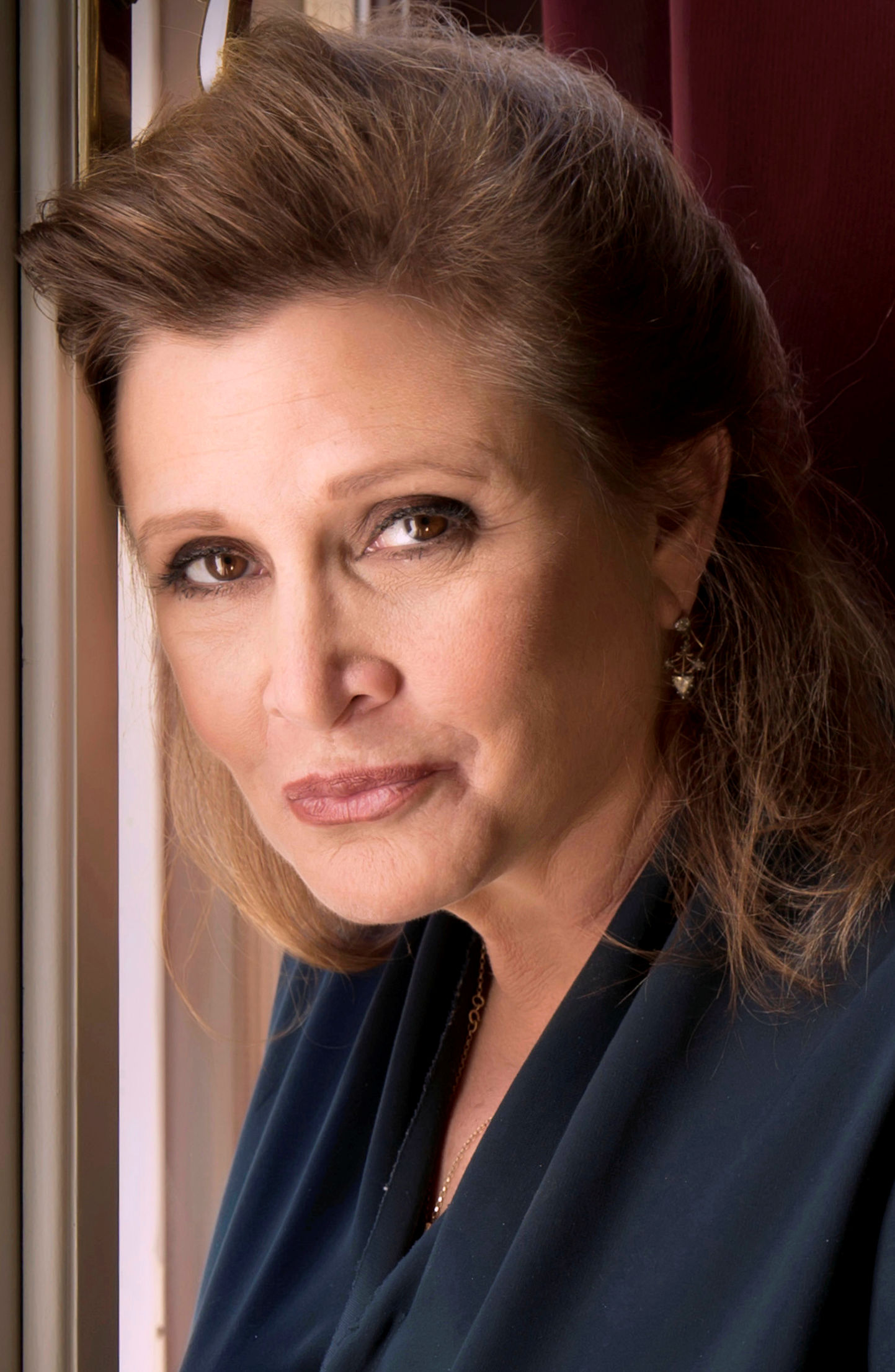
Carrie Fisher

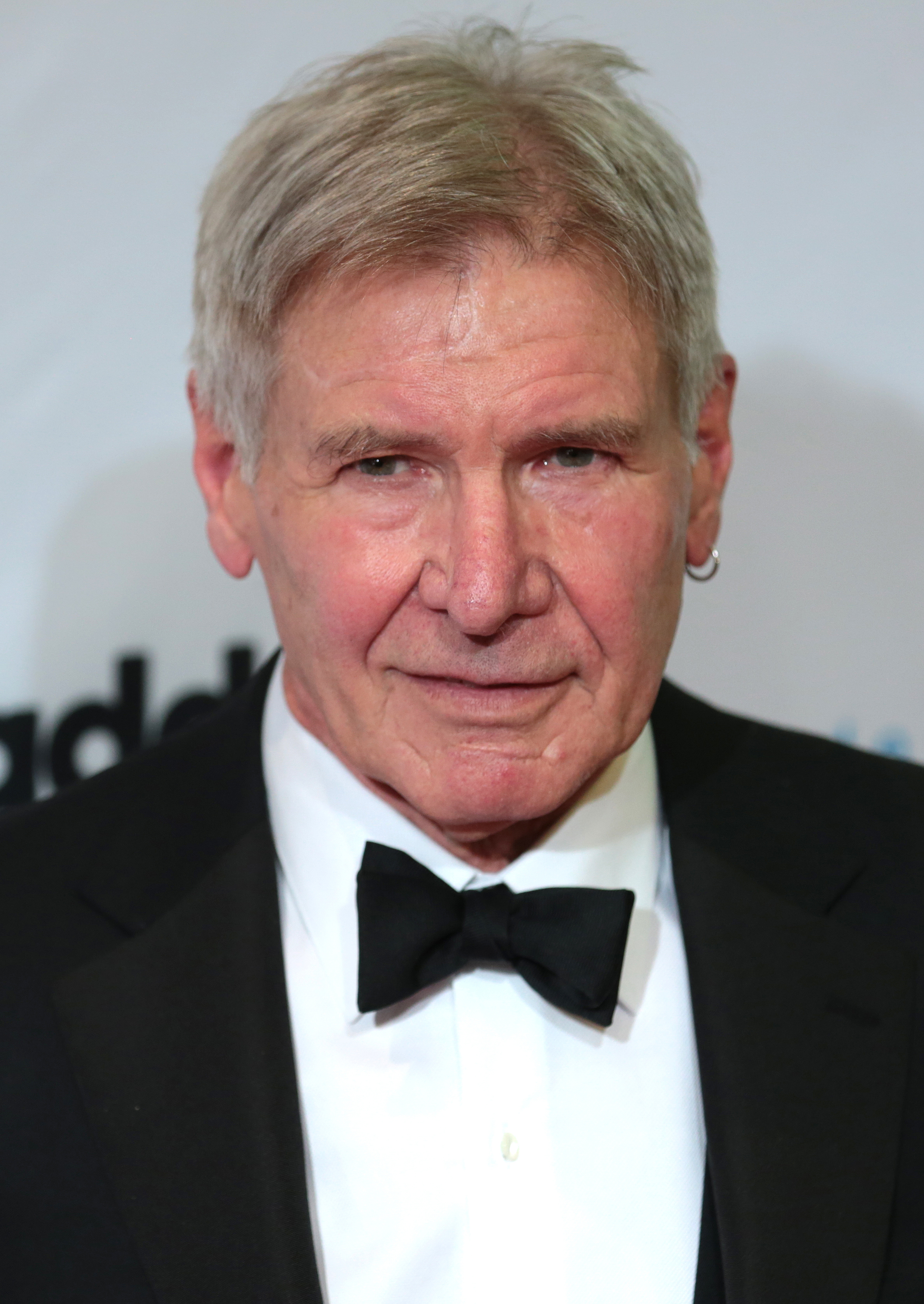
Harrison Ford

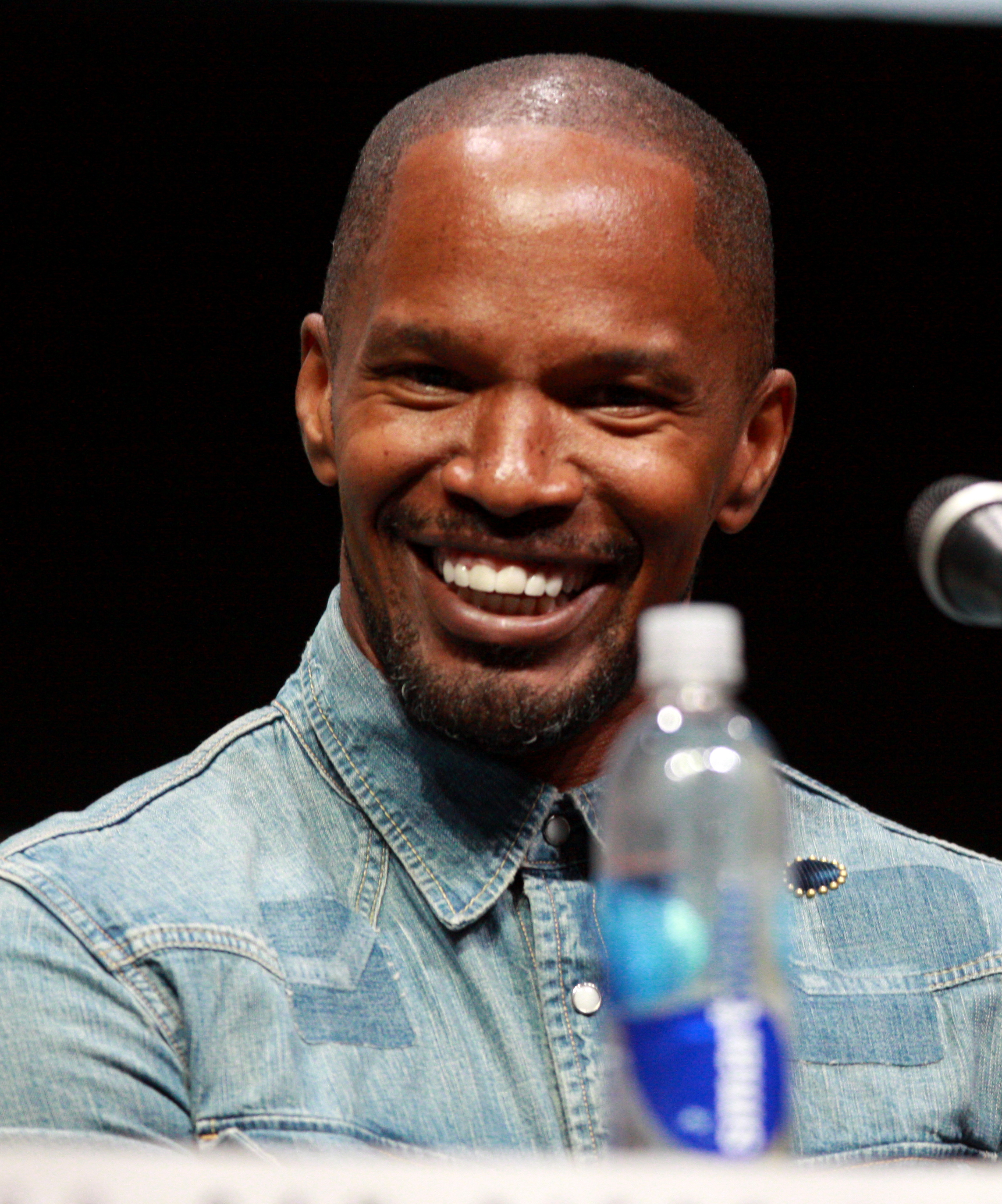
Jamie Foxx
- Donald Faison
- Edie Falco
- Jimmy Fallon
- Anna Faris talks about "gems" with Elmo and Prince
- Colin Farrell talks about the word "investigate" with Elmo and Murray
- Suzanne Farrell
- Lorna and Lorena Feijóo dance with Zoe in episode 4162
- Leslie Feist sang an adaptation of her hit song "1234"
- José Feliciano
- Fergie
- Craig Ferguson demonstrates the word "experiment" with the help of Elmo and some chickens
- Jesse Tyler Ferguson discusses "fragile" with Cookie Monster
- José Ferrer (played Maria's uncle in season 19)
- Tina Fey as a "book-aneer" in episode 4135
- Sally Field
- Harvey Fierstein
- Fifth Harmony sings That's Music with Elmo
- Rocco Fiorentino
- Laurence Fishburne demonstrates on how to brush their teeth with Telly and Rosita
- Peggy Fleming
- Renée Fleming
- Jodie Foster
- The Four Tops
- Matthew Fox teaching Elmo about bones
- Jamie Foxx sang the alphabet with Elmo, a fox named "Jamie Fox", and a duck named "Jaime Fox"
- Dennis Franz
- Brendan Fraser teaching the word "speedy" with Grover demonstrating it, sings along in "Set Your Piggies Free"
- Walt Frazier
- Matt Frewer (appeared in character as Max Headroom)
- Santino Fontana
- Judah Friedlander teaching the word "spectacular" with Telly
- The Fugees
- Sia Furler

== G ==
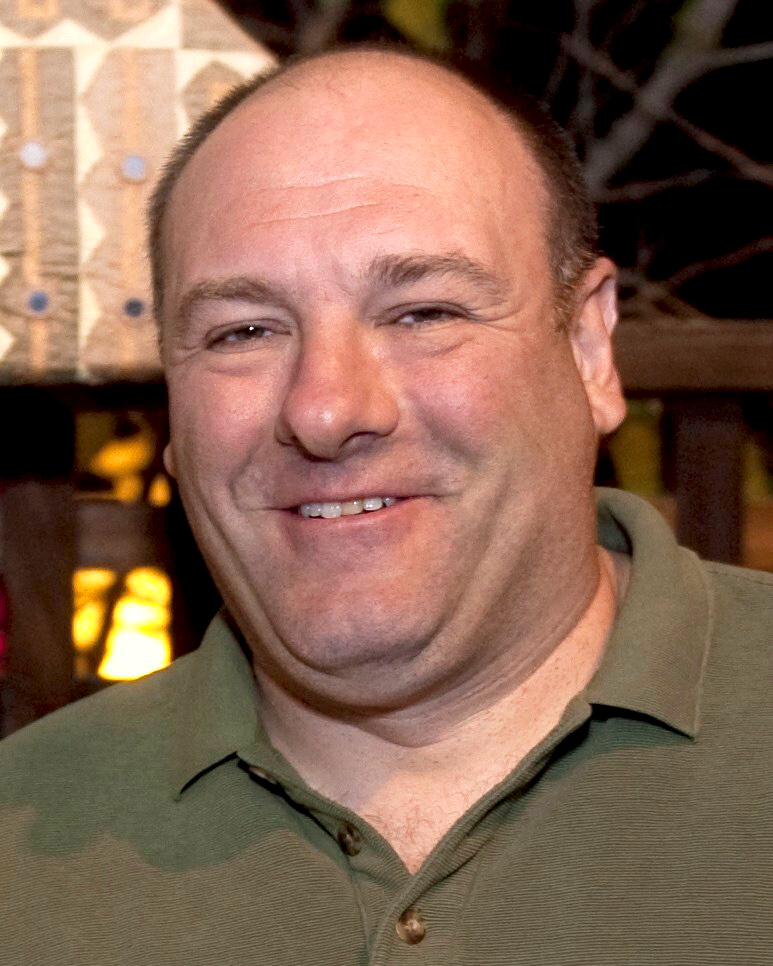
James Gandolfini

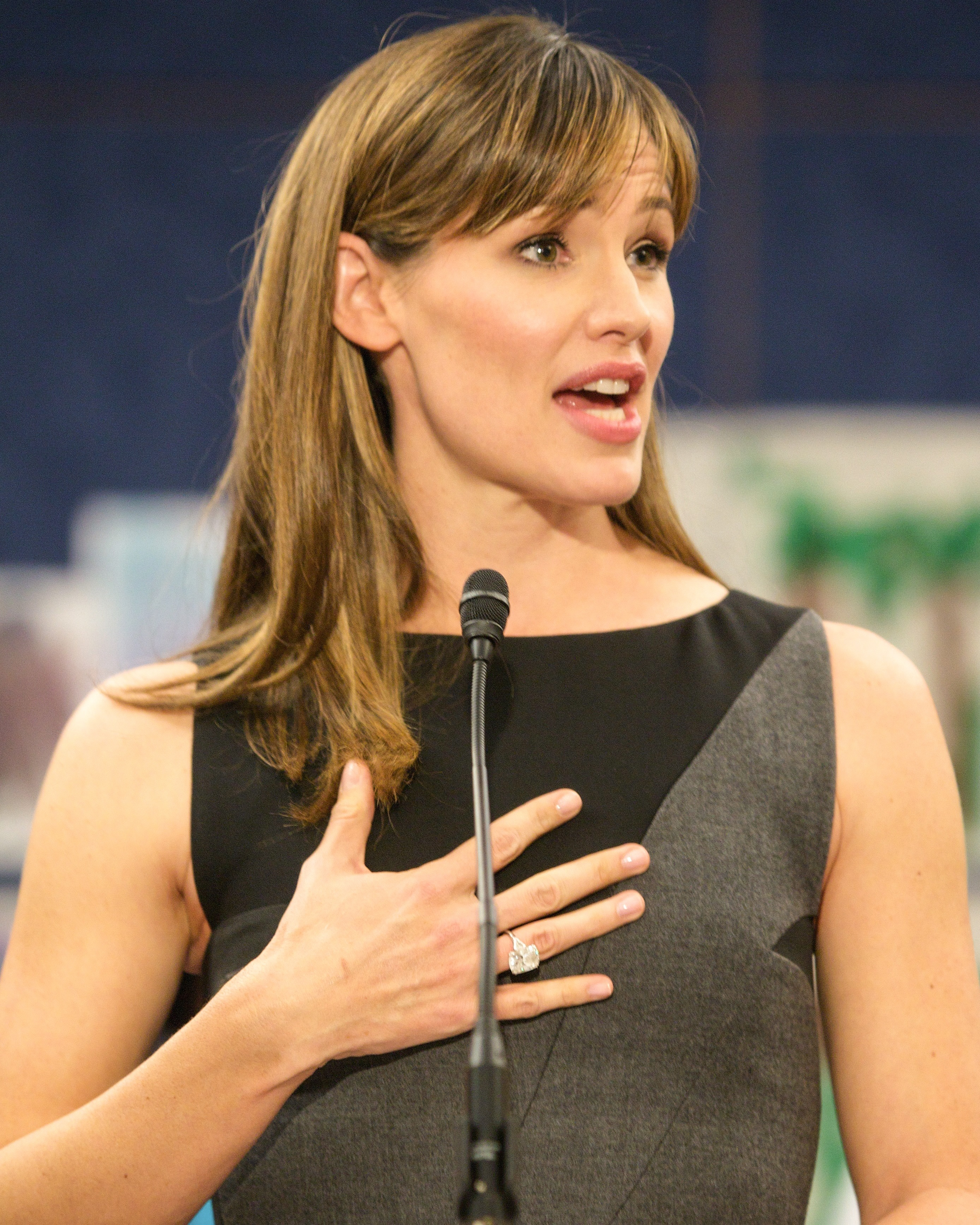
Jennifer Garner

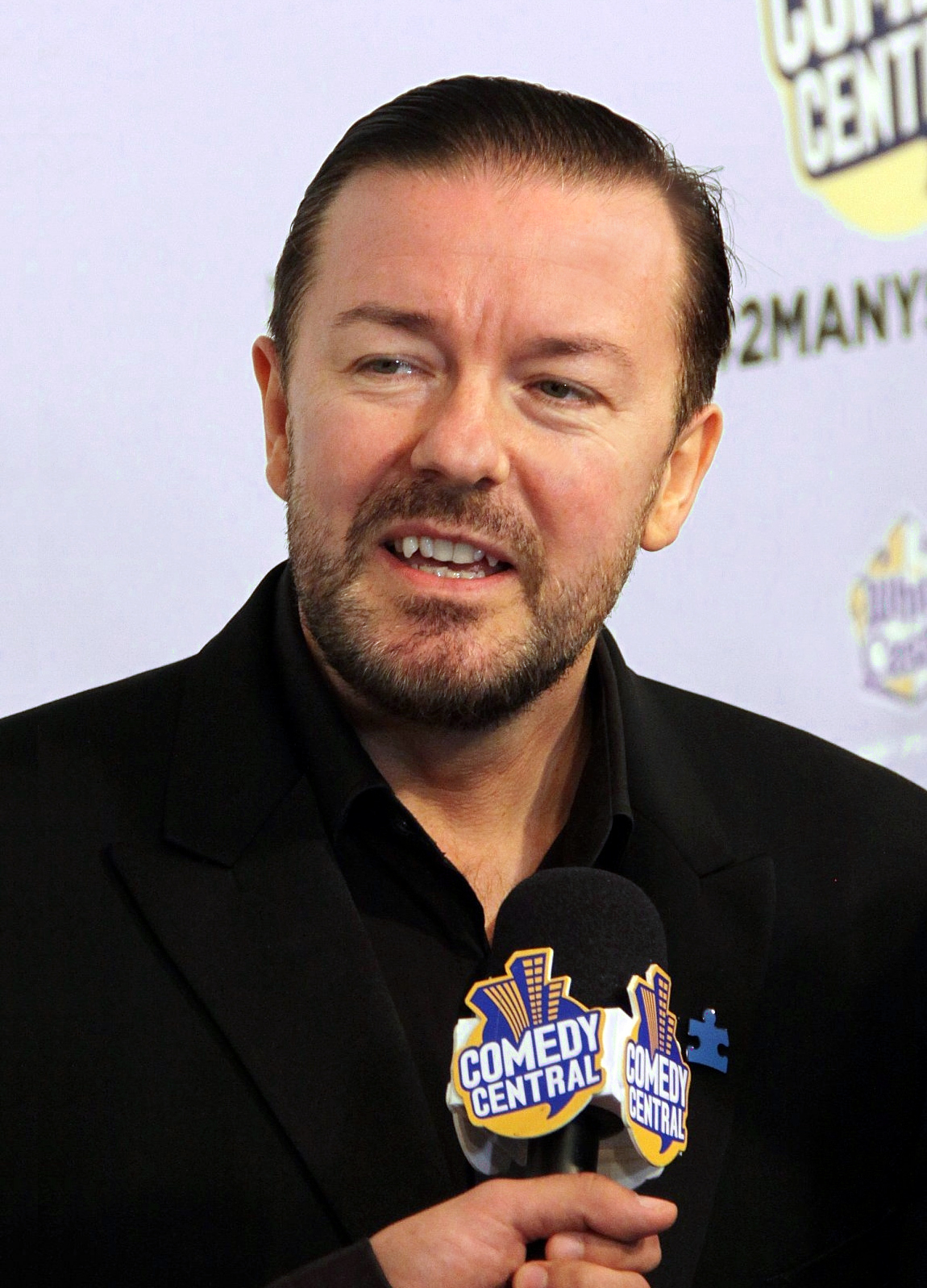
Ricky Gervais

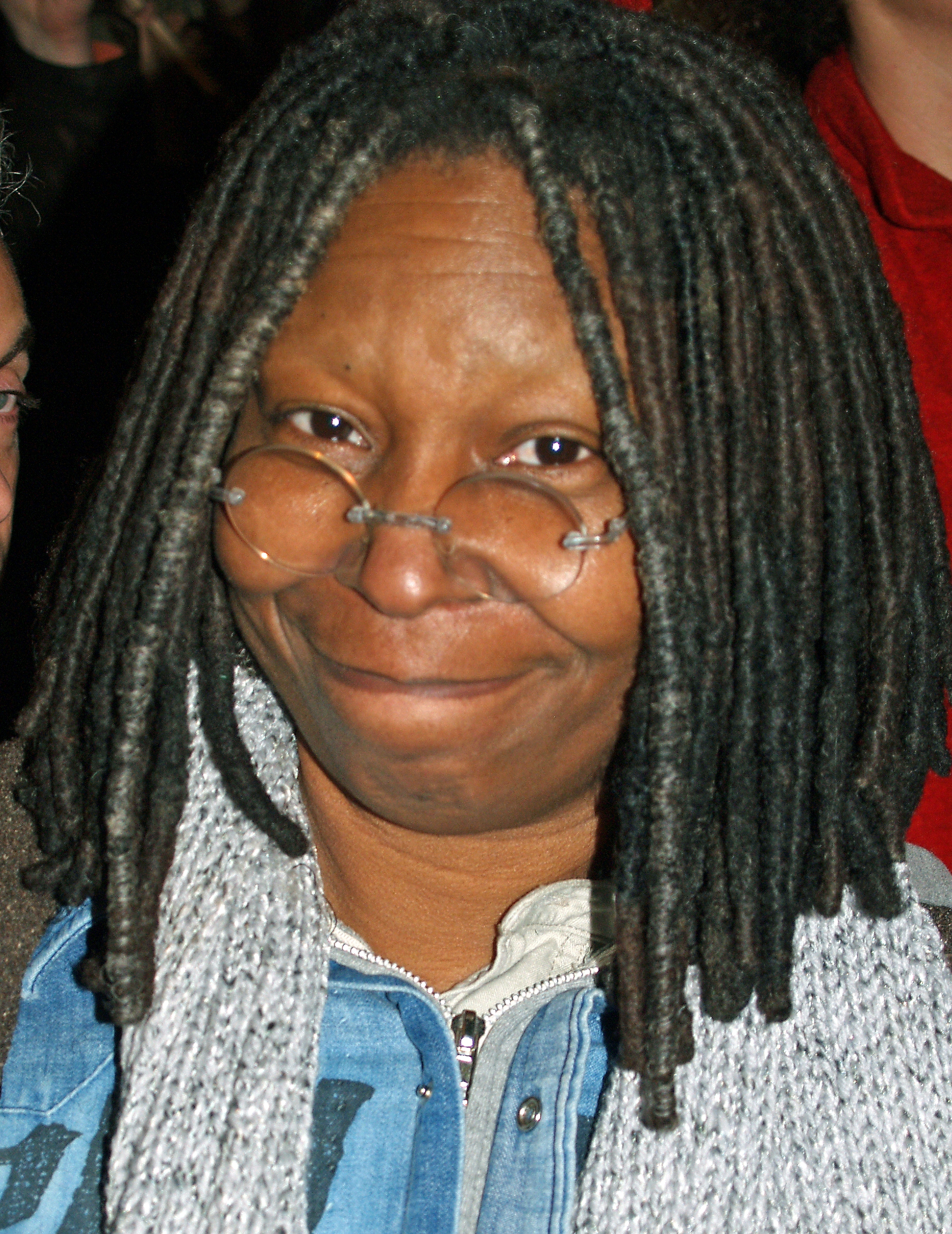
Whoopi Goldberg

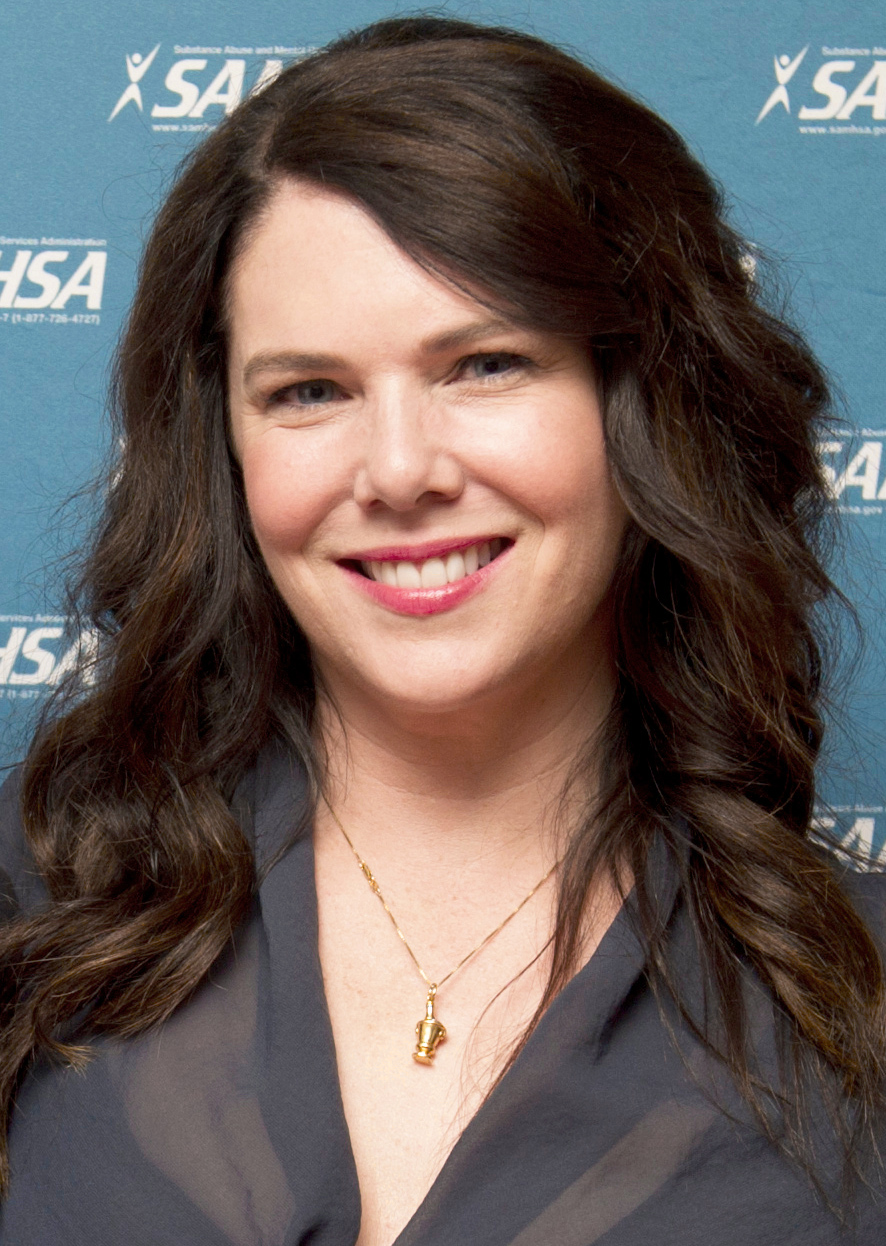
Lauren Graham

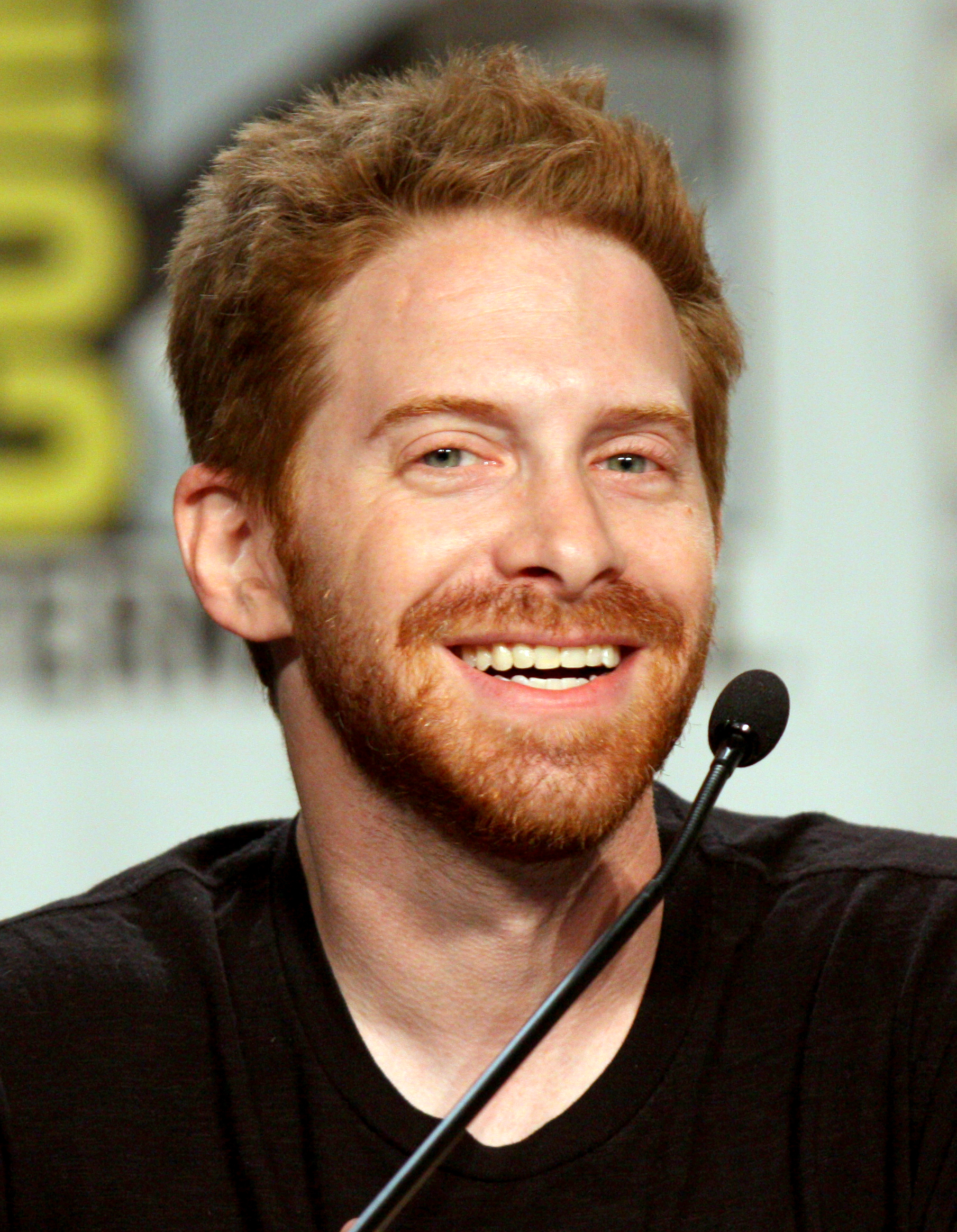
Seth Green
- Josh Gad demonstrating "texture" with Abby
- Johnny Galecki defines "transform" with Abby
- Zach Galifianakis defines the word "nimble" with Murray
- James Gandolfini addressing being scared of the dark, haircuts, and giant talking vegetables
- Billy Gardell defines "cheer" with Elmo and Abby Cadabby
- Jennifer Garner explaining the word "galoshes" with Abby Cadabby; demonstrates "stretch" with Elmo
- Jennie Garth defines the word "garden" with Abby Cadabby
- Pau Gasol defines the word "coach" with Abby Cadabby
- Crystal Gayle
- Sarah Michelle Gellar explaining the word "disappointed"
- Ricky Gervais defined "stumble"; helped sing "Set Your Piggies Free"; sang a Celebrity Lullaby to Elmo
- Charles Gibson defines the word "predicament" in episode 4149
- Mel Gibson
- Kathie Lee Gifford
- Dizzy Gillespie
- Evelyn Glennie
- Danny Glover
- Donald Glover as LMNOP
- Whoopi Goldberg talked with Elmo about skin color and hair texture
- Jeff Goldblum appeared as Minneapolis Johnson, an Indiana Jones-like character who took Big Bird, Snuffleupagus, and his own brother Bob on a quest for golden cabbage, in episode 2687
- Brett Goldstein
- The Goo Goo Dolls performed the song "Pride", which is based on their hit single "Slide"
- Cuba Gooding Jr. defines the word "angry" in episode 4159
- John Goodman
- Ginnifer Goodwin defines the word "adventure" with Abby Cadabby
- Jeff Gordon as a race car announcer for the Squirmadega car race
- Joseph Gordon-Levitt defines the word "reinforce" with Murray
- Amanda Gorman
- Nolan Gould
- Ellie Goulding
- Ben Graham (one segment): Graham, a New York Jets player, appeared in season 38 (2007), along with other Jets, Elmo, and Elmo's goldfish Dorothy
- Lauren Graham discusses "author" with Grover
- Kelsey Grammer
- Judy Graubart
- Denyce Graves
- Seth Green
- Lorne Greene (appeared with the rest of the Bonanza cast in season 2)
- Adrian Grenier acted out the word "season" with Elmo
- David Alan Grier
- Rosey Grier
- Blake Griffin discusses "champion" with Abby Cadabby
- Rachel Griffiths demonstrates "dozen" in episode 4237
- Charles Grodin
- Dave Grohl performs the song “here we go” with Big Bird and Elmo
- Grumpy Cat appearing with Oscar in a video by Mashable
- Tim Gunn
- Mickey Guyton
- Jake Gyllenhaal appeared with an octopus stuck on his head and teaches the word "separate"
- Maggie Gyllenhaal teaches the word "surprise"; did a handstand for "Set Your Piggies Free"

== H ==
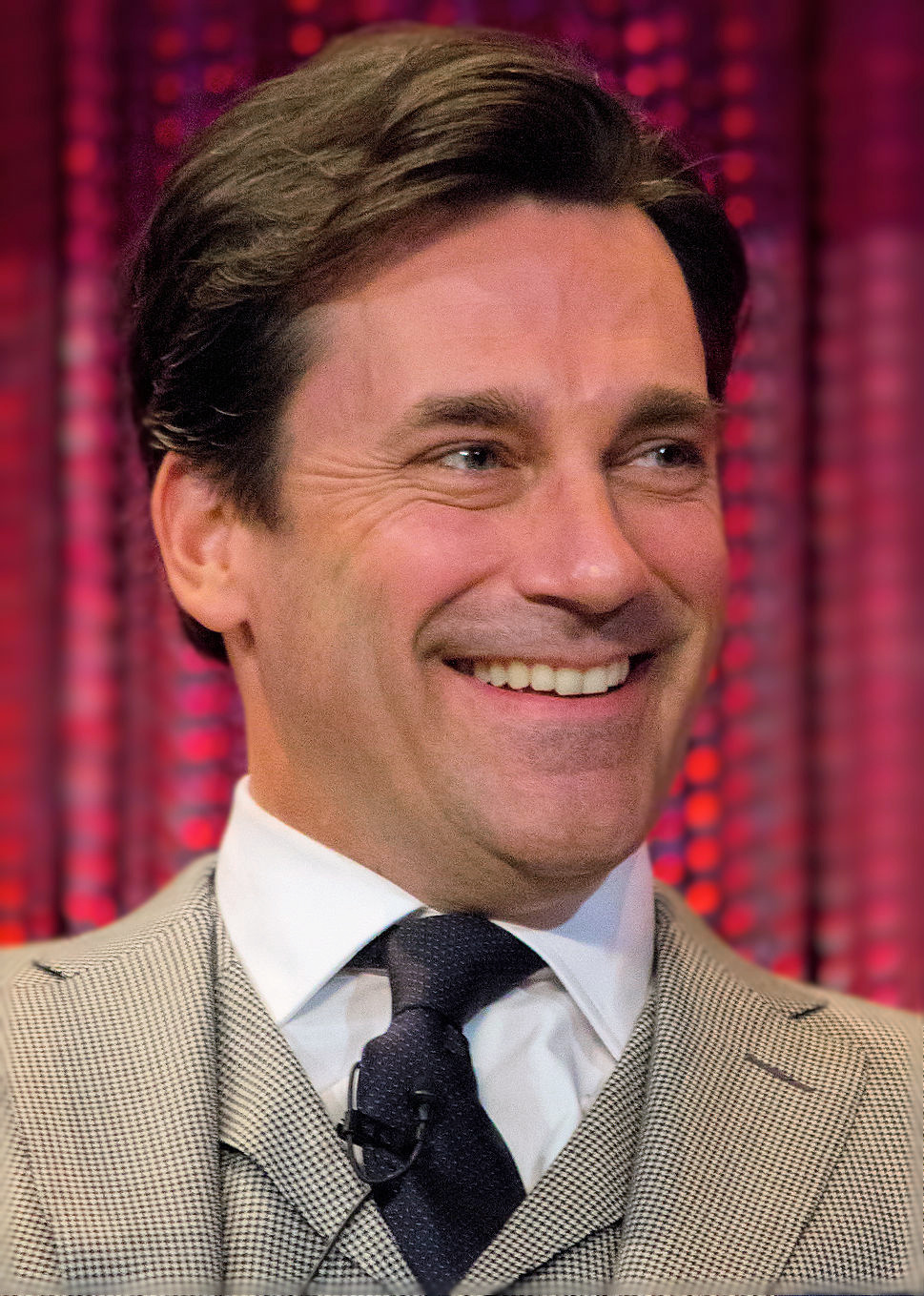
Jon Hamm

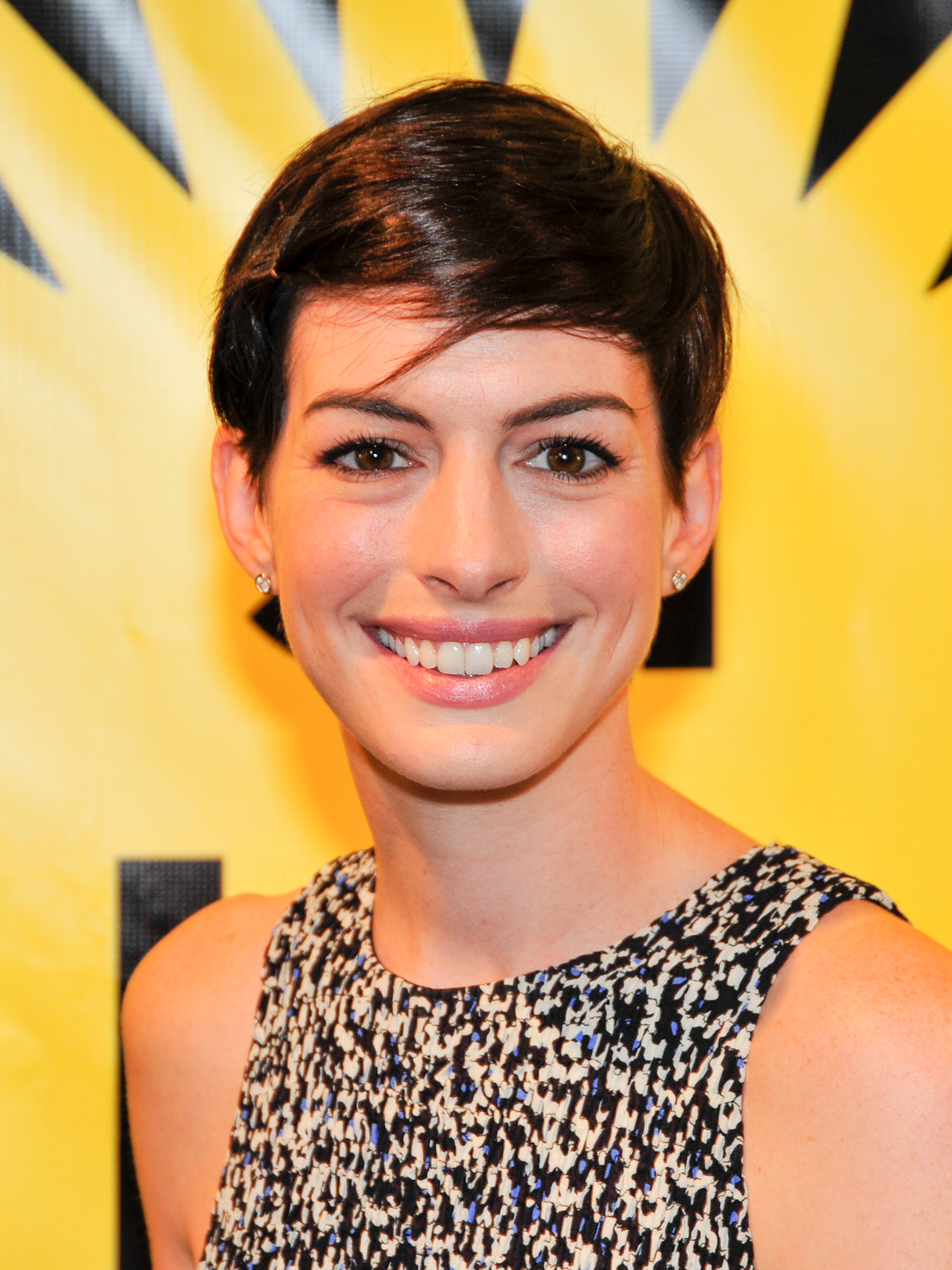
Anne Hathaway

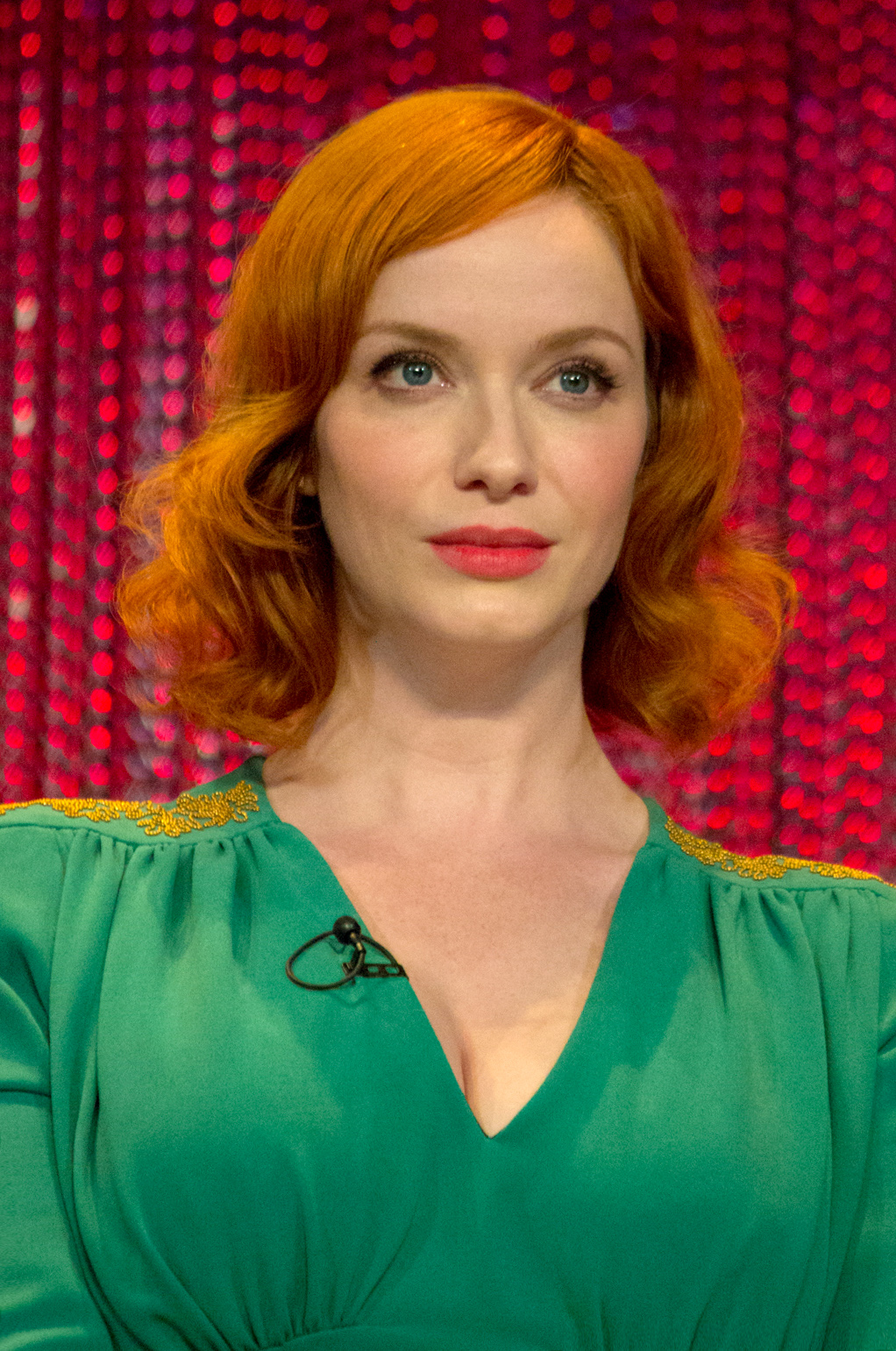
Christina Hendricks

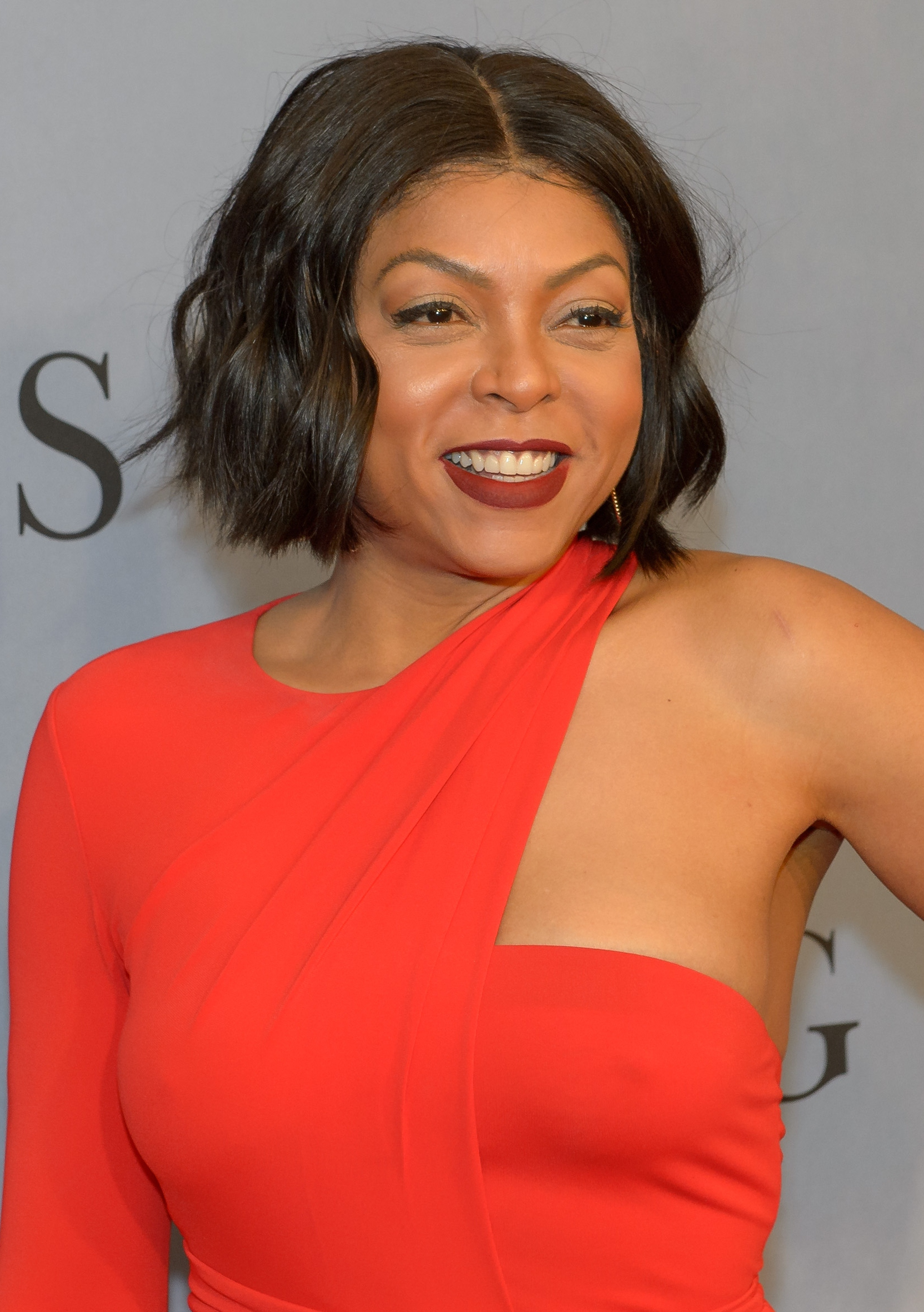
Taraji P. Henson

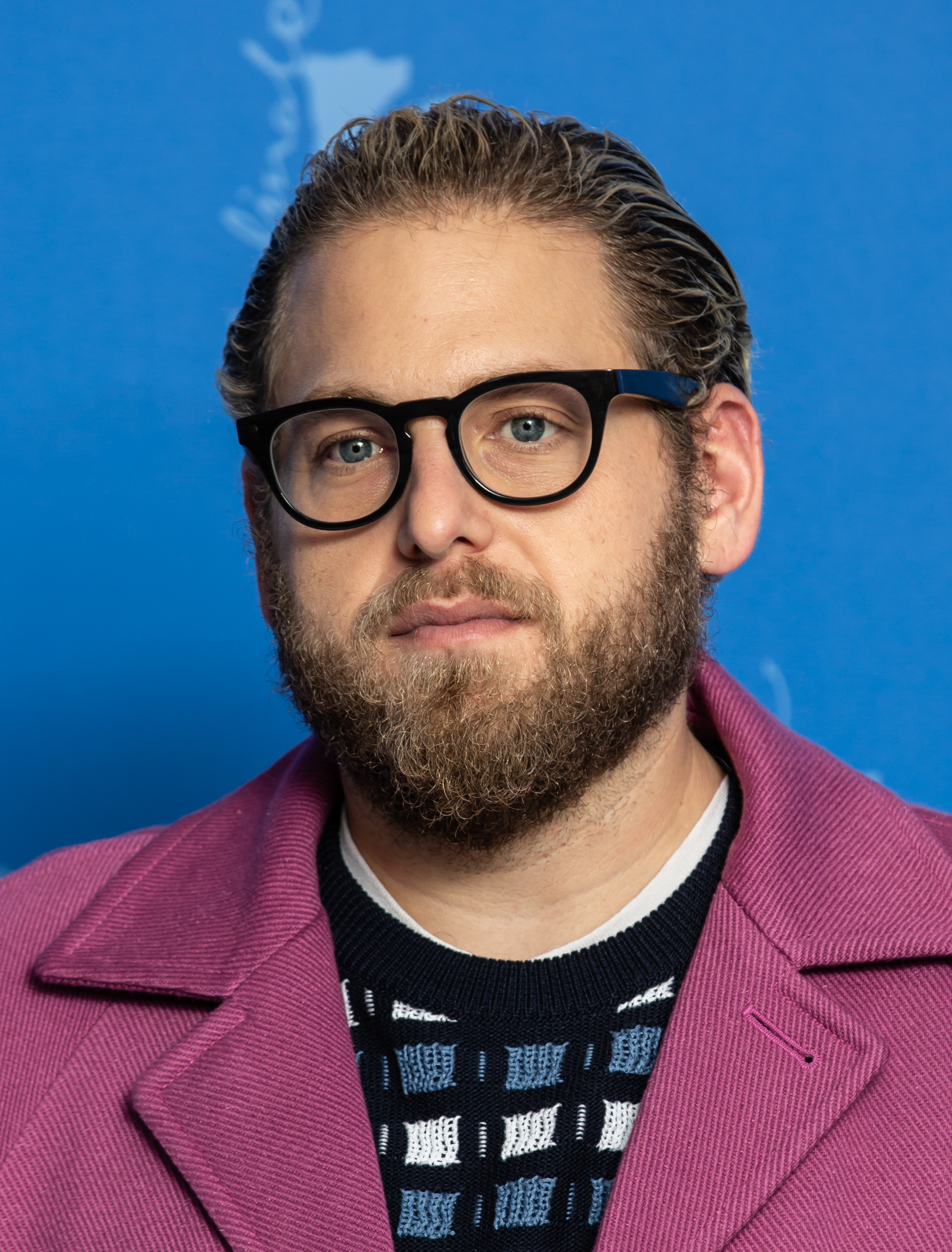
Jonah Hill
- Bill Hader discusses the word "grouchy" with Elmo and Murray
- HAIM
- Margaret Hamilton (appeared in an infamous episode as The Wicked Witch of the West)
- Jon Hamm defines the word "sculpture" with Elmo
- Herbie Hancock showing off the Fairlight Synthesizer
- Kadeem Hardison
- Teri Hatcher
- Mariska Hargitay explaining the word "mystery"
- The Harlem Globetrotters (demonstrated some basketball tricks in season 2)
- Neil Patrick Harris appeared as the "Fairy Shoe Person" and defined the word "curly" with Elmo
- Samantha Harris defines "reporter" with Elmo
- Elisabeth Hasselbeck defines the word "camouflage" in episode 4199
- Anne Hathaway
- Richie Havens
- Tony Hawk counts the number of wheels on a skateboard
- Lena Headey defines the word "relax" with Murray
- Ed Helms demonstrates "grimace" with Elmo
- Christina Hendricks demonstrates "technology" with Elmo
- Don Henley
- Georgie Henley
- Taraji P. Henson
- Keith Hernandez appeared in Put Down the Duckie
- William Hickey
- Tom Hiddleston
- Faith Hill sang about sharing with her husband, Tim McGraw
- Jonah Hill appeared wearing a fake mustache, which he gave to Elmo; defines the word "empty" with Murray
- Maurice Hines and his brother Gregory
- Hootie & the Blowfish sang about crossing the street
- Niall Horan
- Lena Horne (sang "How Do You Do?" with Grover)
- Marilyn Horne
- Allan Houston in the song, Play Ball
- Dwight Howard defines the word "strategy" with Elmo
- Ron Howard
- Terrence Howard
- Jennifer Hudson performs about Xmas
- Sarah Hughes discusses "persistence" with Elmo
- Bonnie Hunt
- Lillian Hurst

== I ==
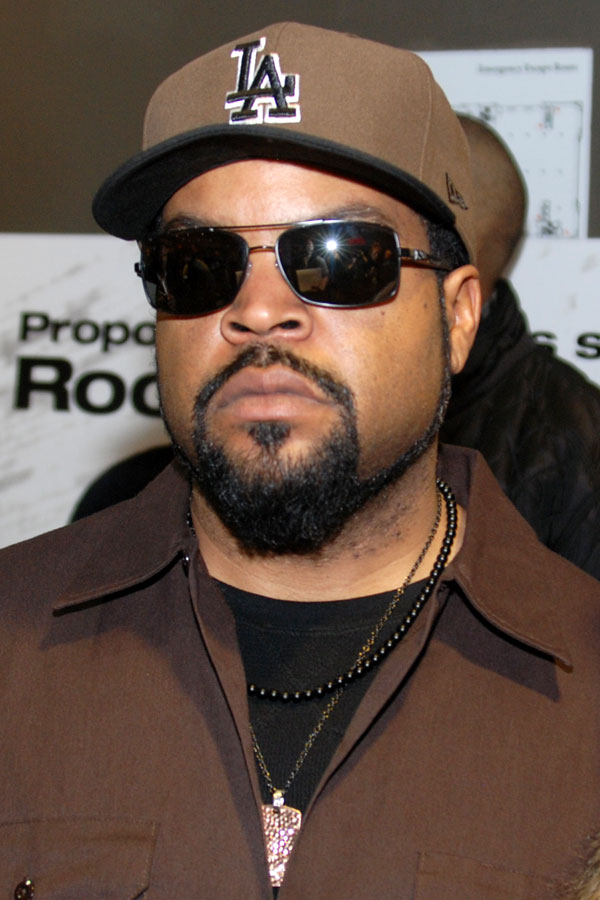
Ice Cube

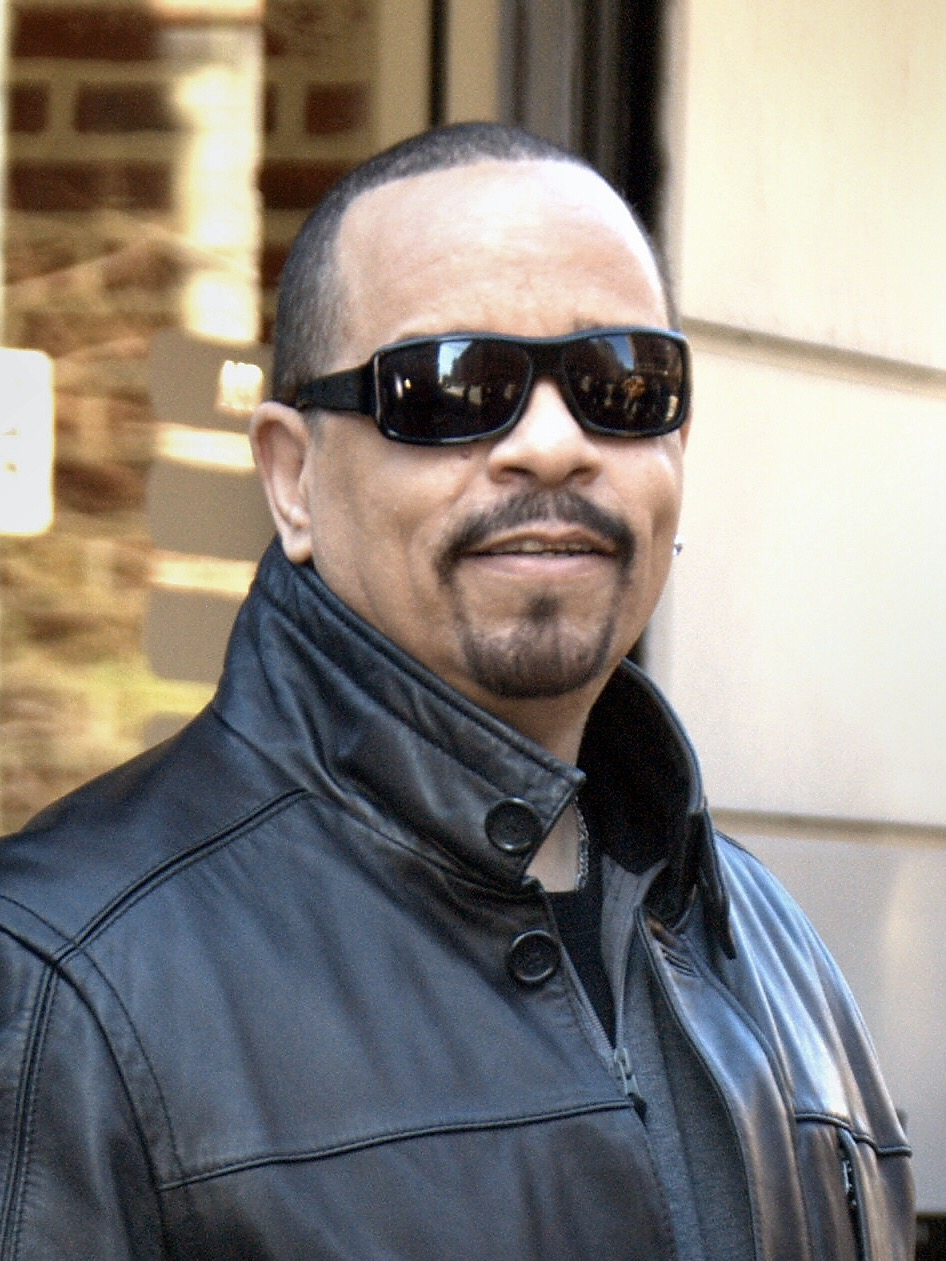
Ice-T

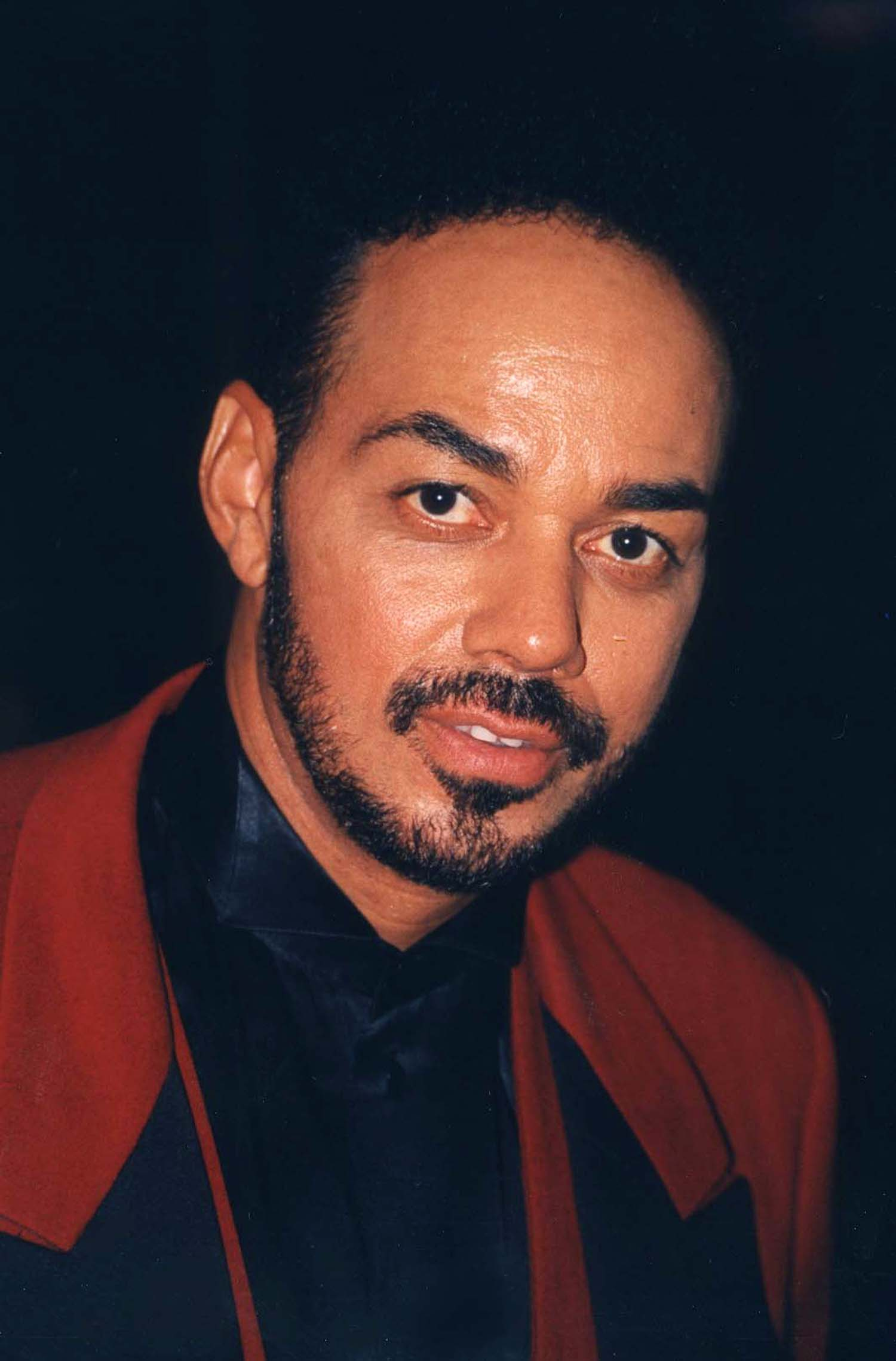
James Ingram

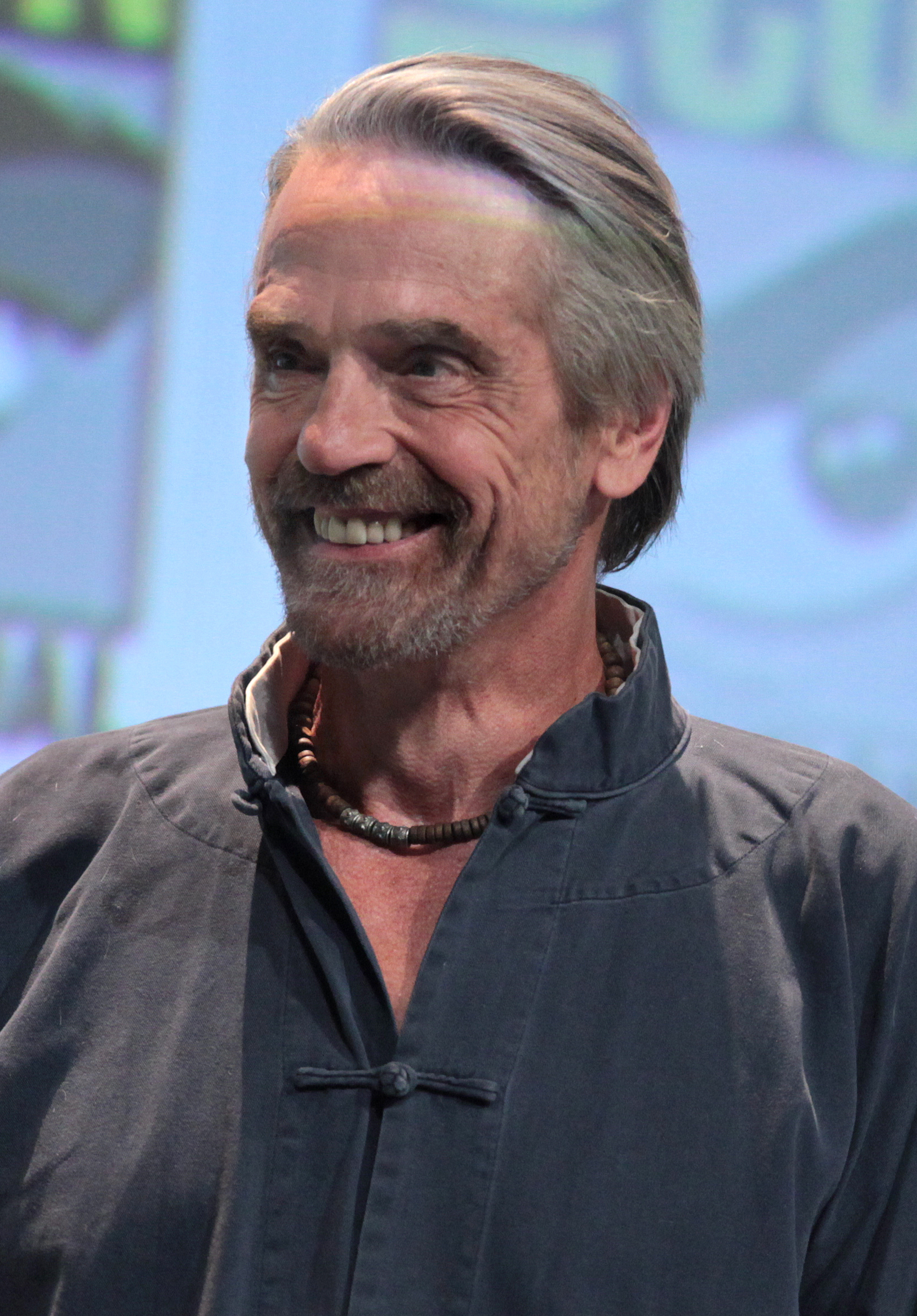
Jeremy Irons

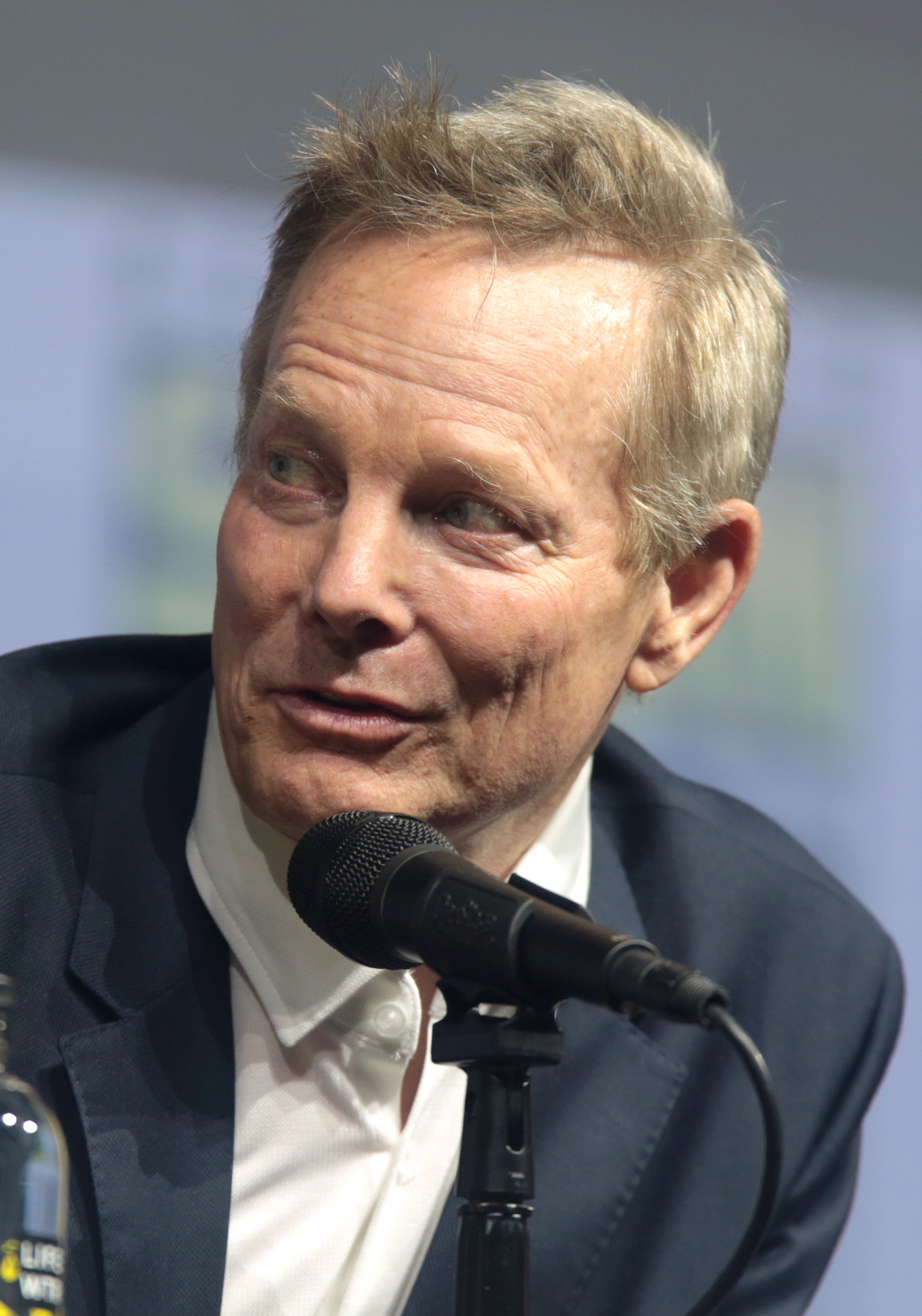
Bill Irwin
- Ice Cube tells Elmo about "astounding" things
- Ice-T
- Il Divo
- india.arie sings the ABC's with Elmo
- Mark Ingram (one special): Ingram, a New York Giants player, appeared during the celebrity performance of "Put Down the Duckie" in Put Down the Duckie: The Sesame Street Special
- Jeremy Irons appeared during the celebrity performance of "Put Down the Duckie" in Put Down the Duckie: The Sesame Street Special, 1988
- Bill Irwin (appeared in a season 23 sketch as a man caught in a windstorm, appeared in season 25's remake of "A New Way To Walk", appeared as "Professor Television" in season 28 and currently plays Mr. Noodle)
- Isiah Thomas
- Judith Ivey
- Burl Ives

== J ==
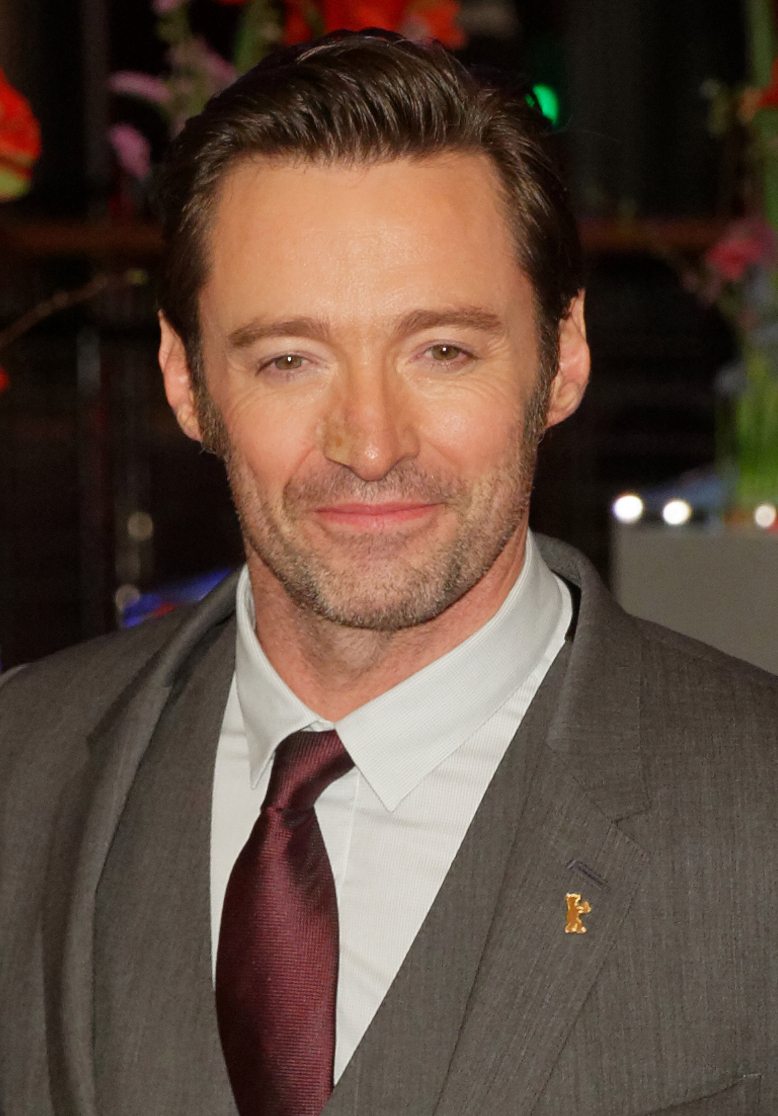
Hugh Jackman

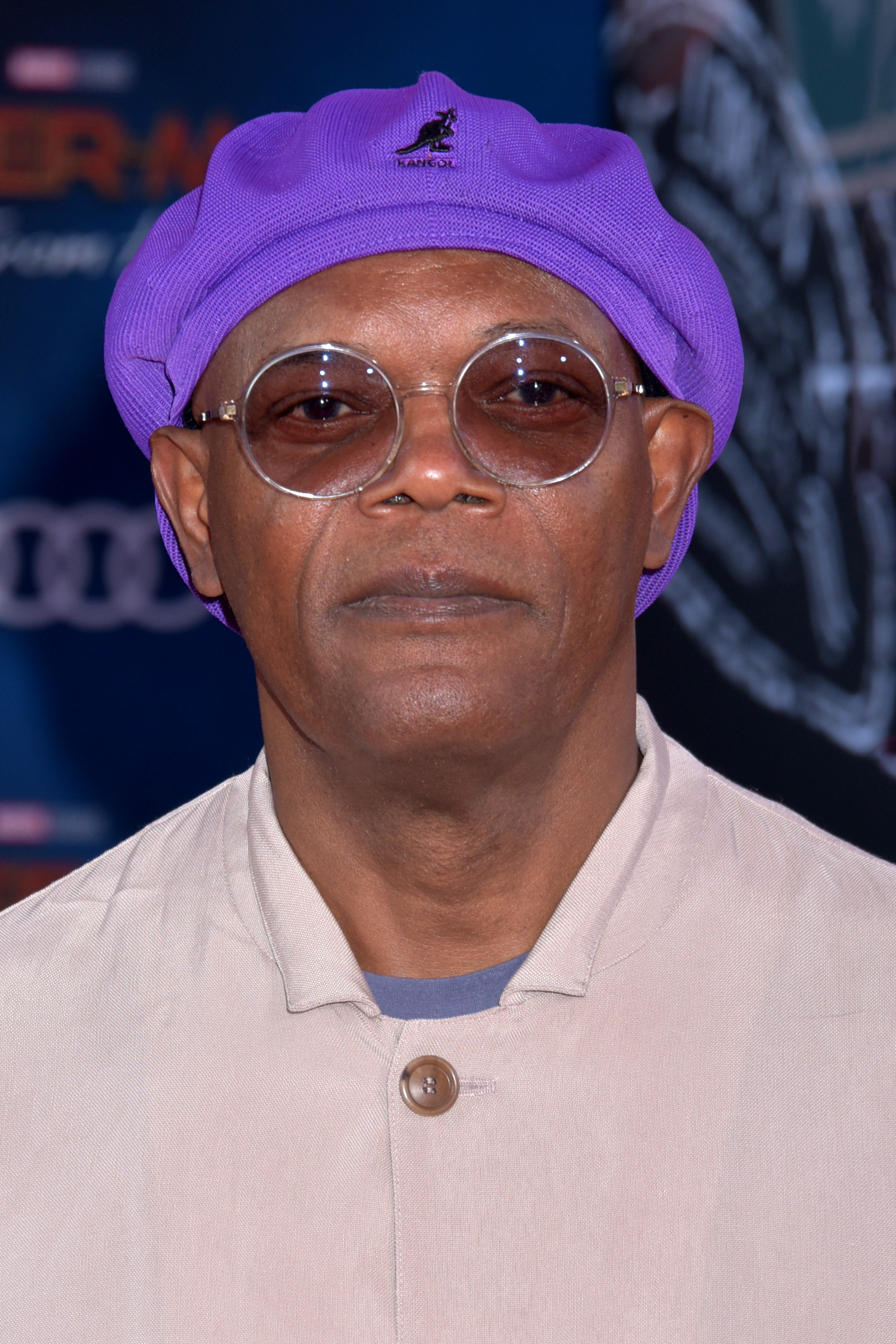
Samuel L. Jackson

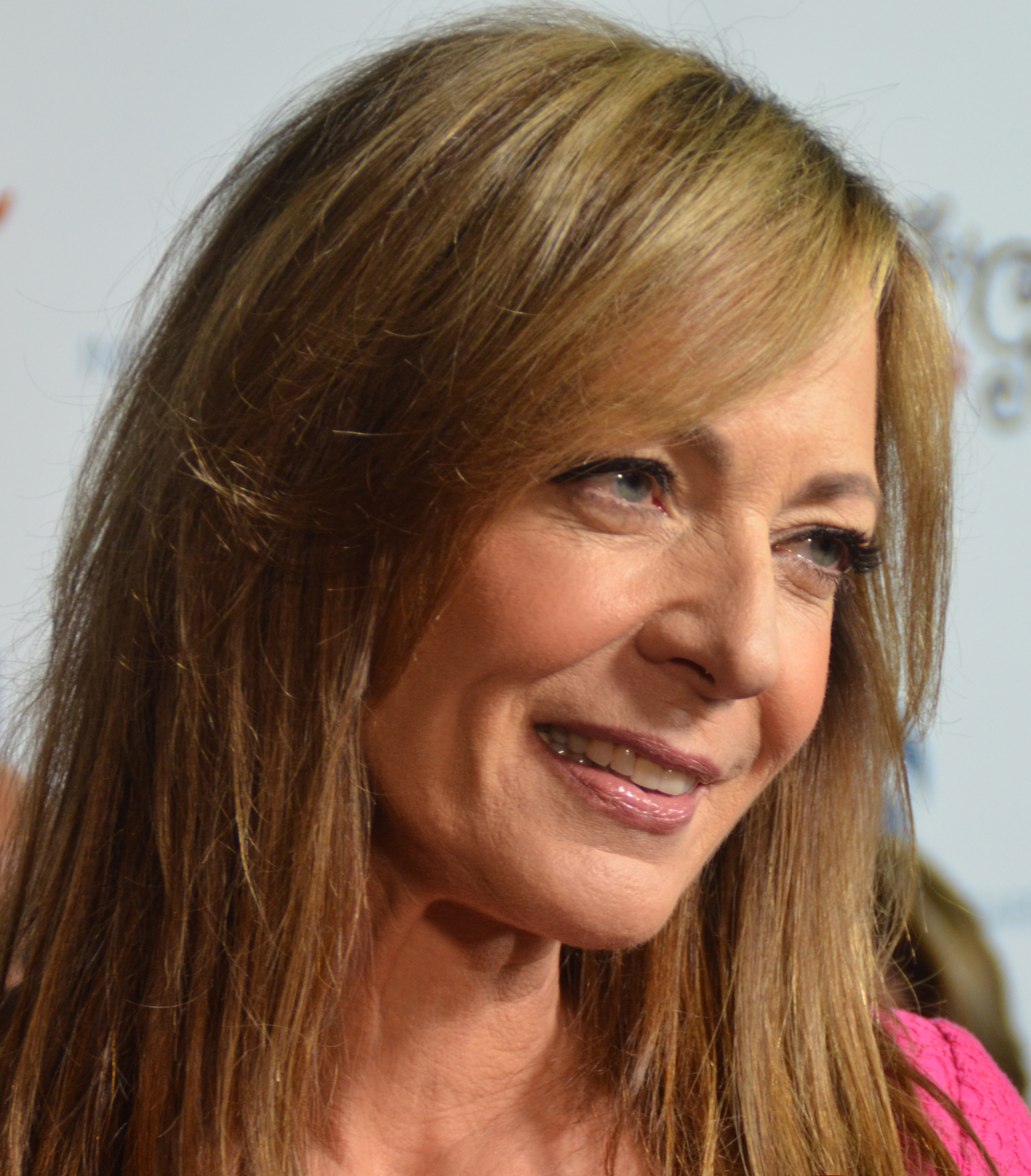
Allison Janney

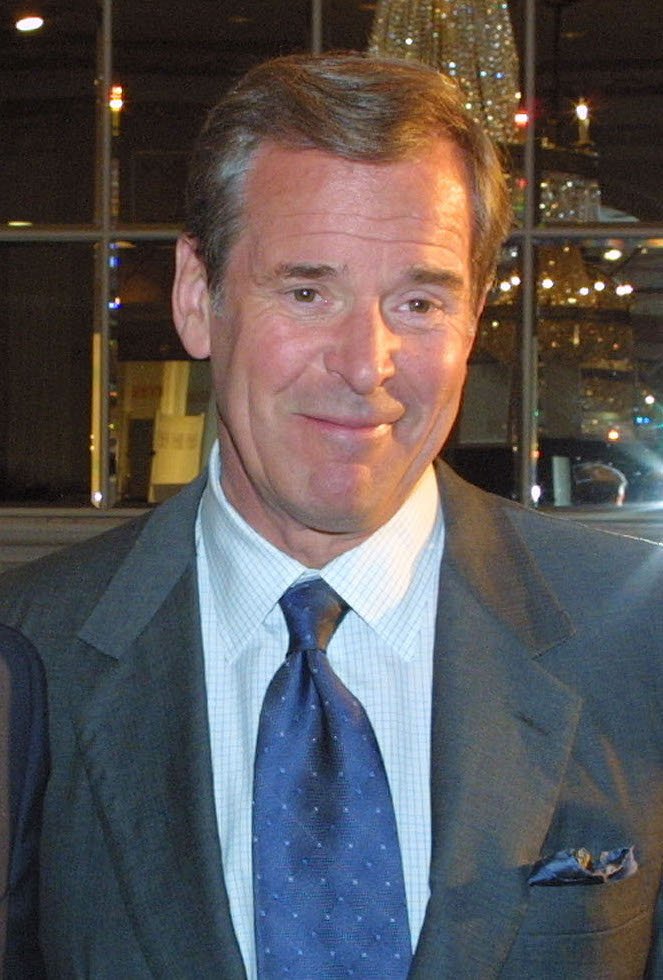
Peter Jennings

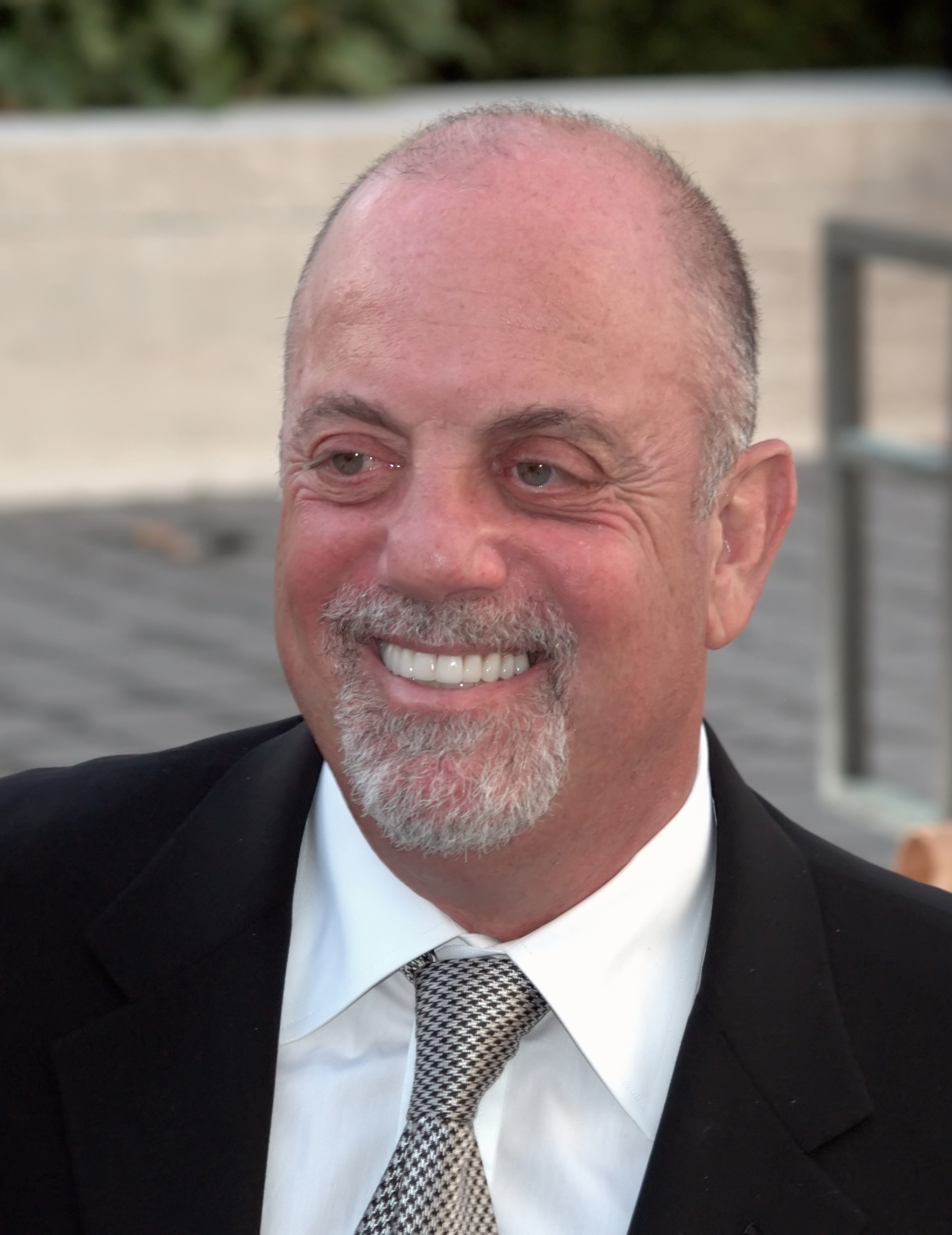
Billy Joel

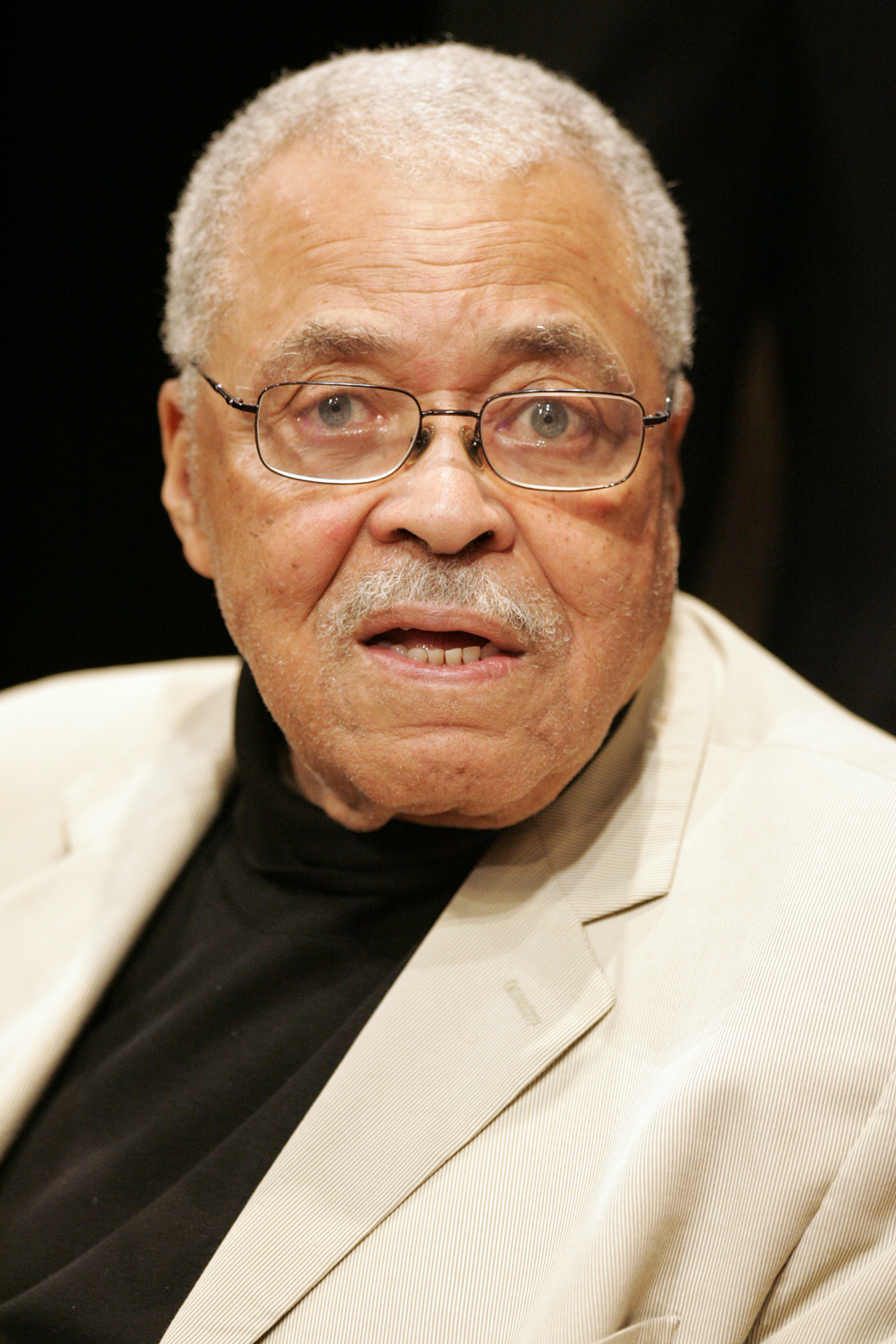
James Earl Jones
- Hugh Jackman appeared with Elmo and teaches the word "concentration"
- Bo Jackson
- Gordon Jackson
- Jesse Jackson (one segment): Civil rights activist Jackson recited the free verse poem "I Am – Somebody" to numerous children and adult gathered around him on 123 Sesame Street
- Mahalia Jackson
- Randy Jackson demonstrates the word "glockenspiel" with a dog
- Samuel L. Jackson
- Kevin James
- Allison Janney
- Wyclef Jean
- Mae Jemison
- Ken Jennings (one segment): Appeared in 2005 for a Healthy Moments segment, Jennings won a date with a pineapple after playing a game with Grover
- Peter Jennings
- Waylon Jennings (appeared in Follow that Bird as a truck driver)
- Ken Jeong discusses "deciduous" with Elmo
- Carly Rae Jepsen
- Michael Jeter (appeared in a rendition of the alphabet song, sang a version of "Dance Myself to Sleep", and played Mr. Noodle's brother, Mr. Noodle)
- The New York Jets represented by Chad Pennington, Laveranues Coles, Ben Graham, and head coach Eric Mangini (episode 4147)
- Billy Joel sings with Marlee Matlin
- Elton John
- Arte Johnson (appeared as his Laugh-In character, Wolfgang, in season 2)
- Nick Jonas (sang "Check That Shape")
- James Earl Jones (guest starred in the first season (1969), reciting the alphabet and counting numbers. He later hosted the 10th anniversary special, where he was reunited with his former drama teacher, Will Lee.)
- Jason Jones
- Norah Jones sings with Elmo about her friend Y not meeting her; sings "Don't Know Why"
- Sarah Jones
- Shirley Jones
- Michael B. Jordan
- Juanes

== K ==
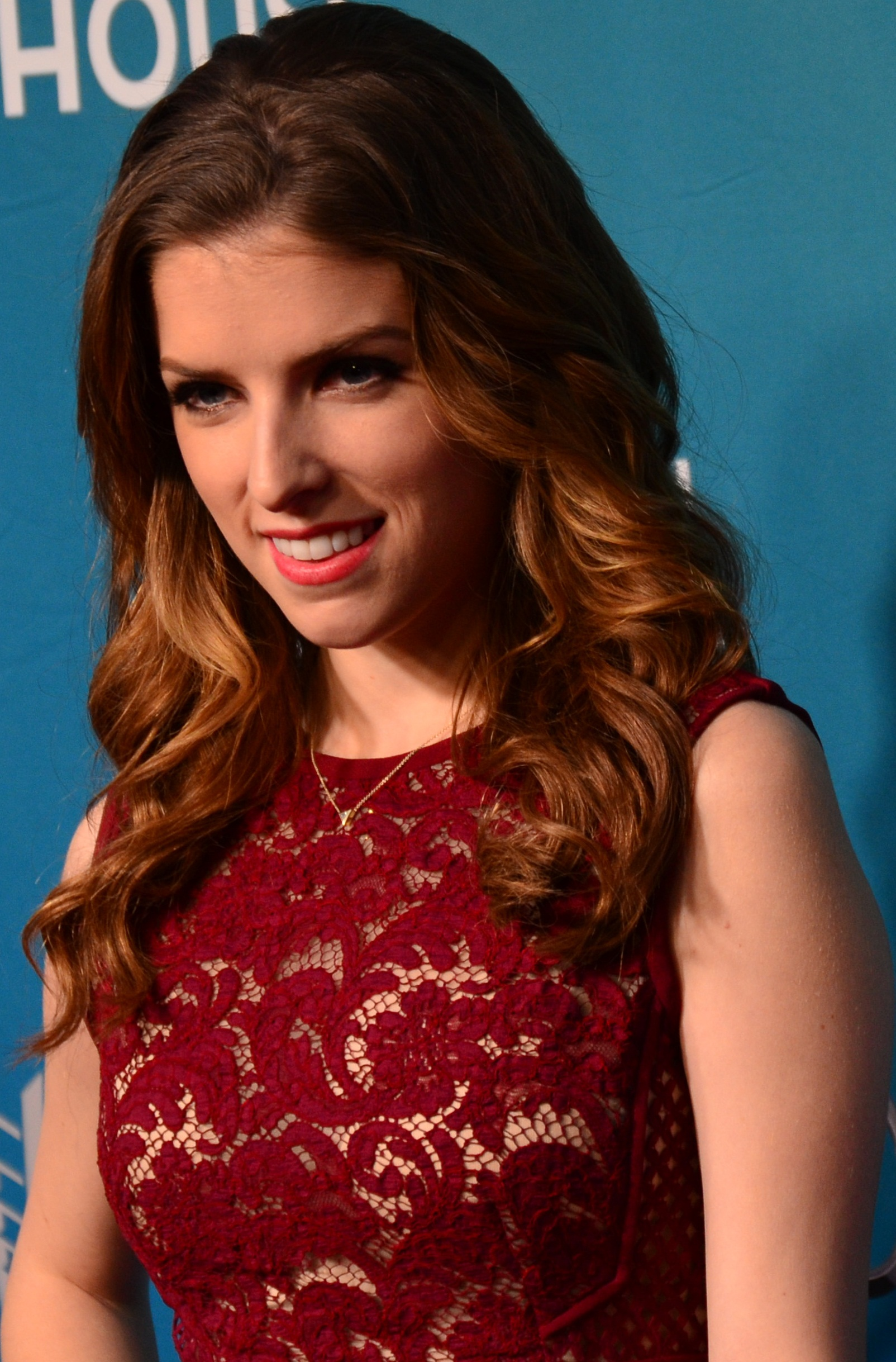
Anna Kendrick

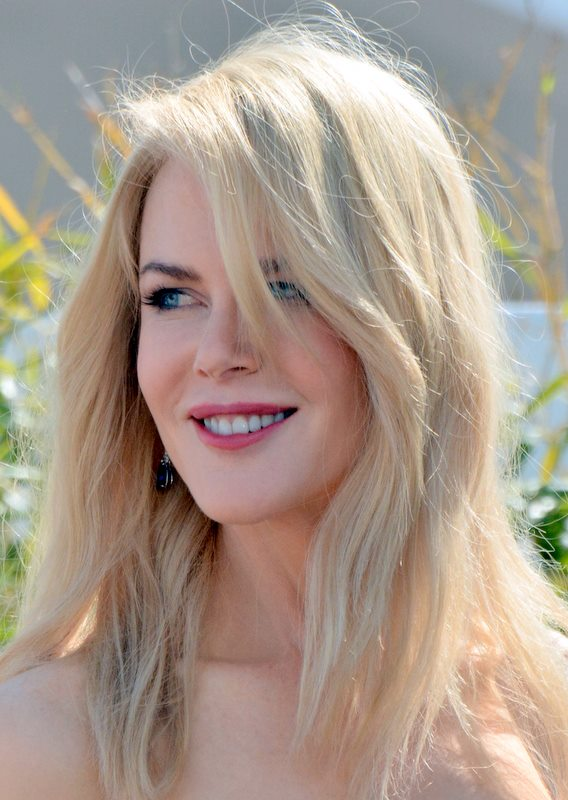
Nicole Kidman

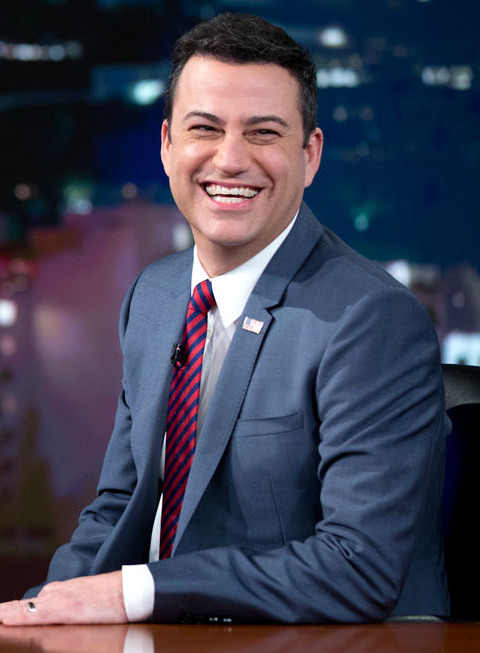
Jimmy Kimmel

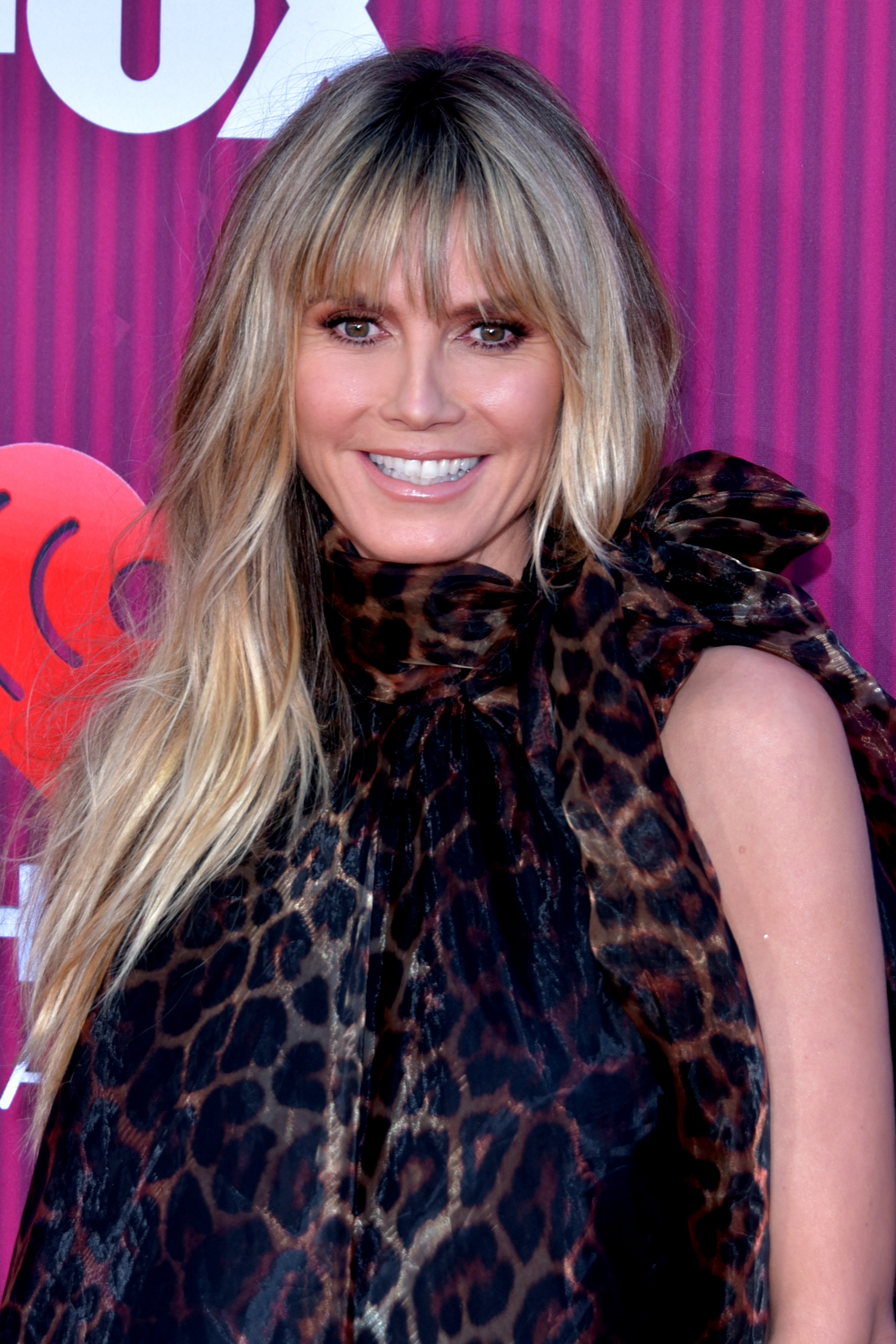
Heidi Klum

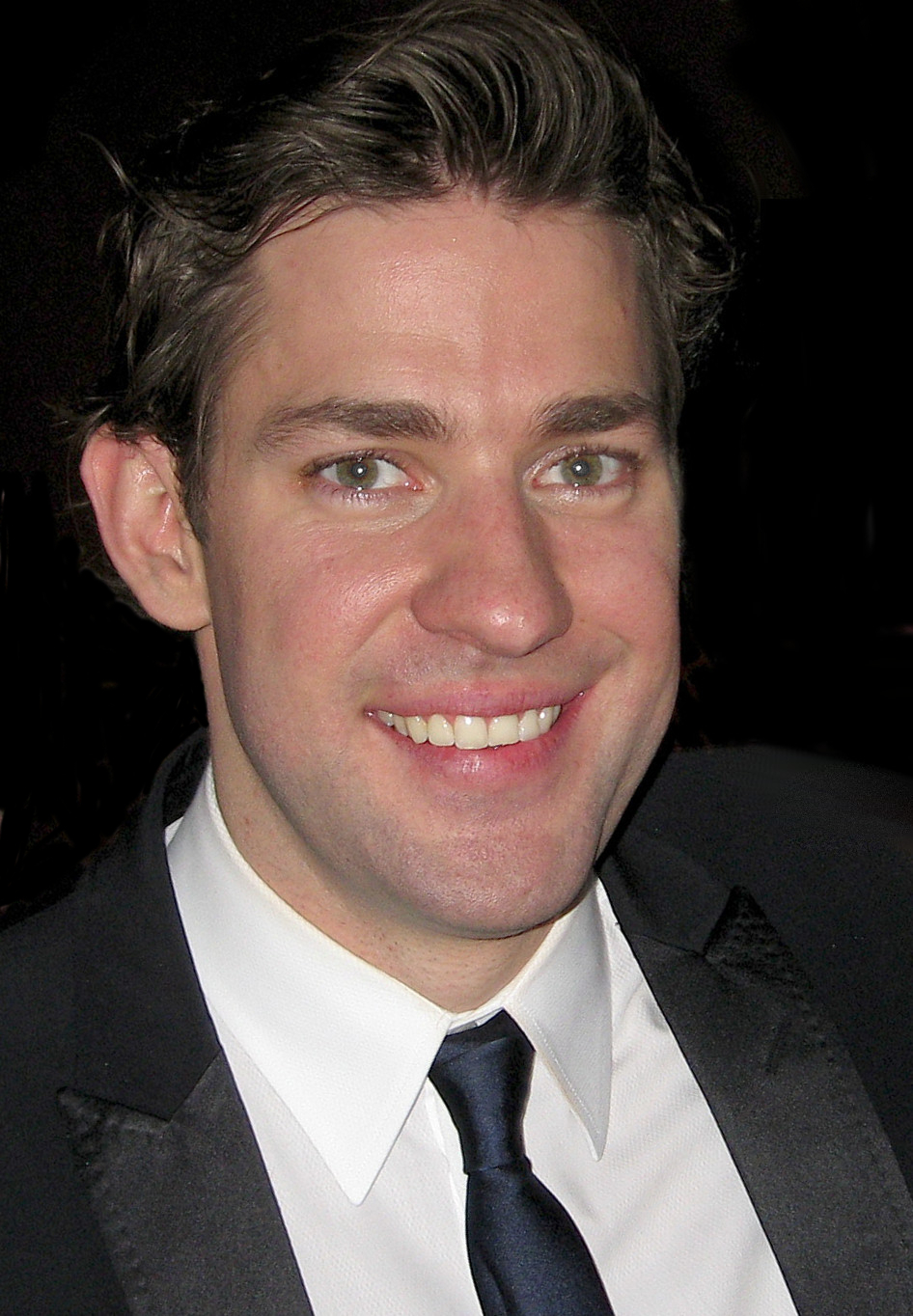
John Krasinski

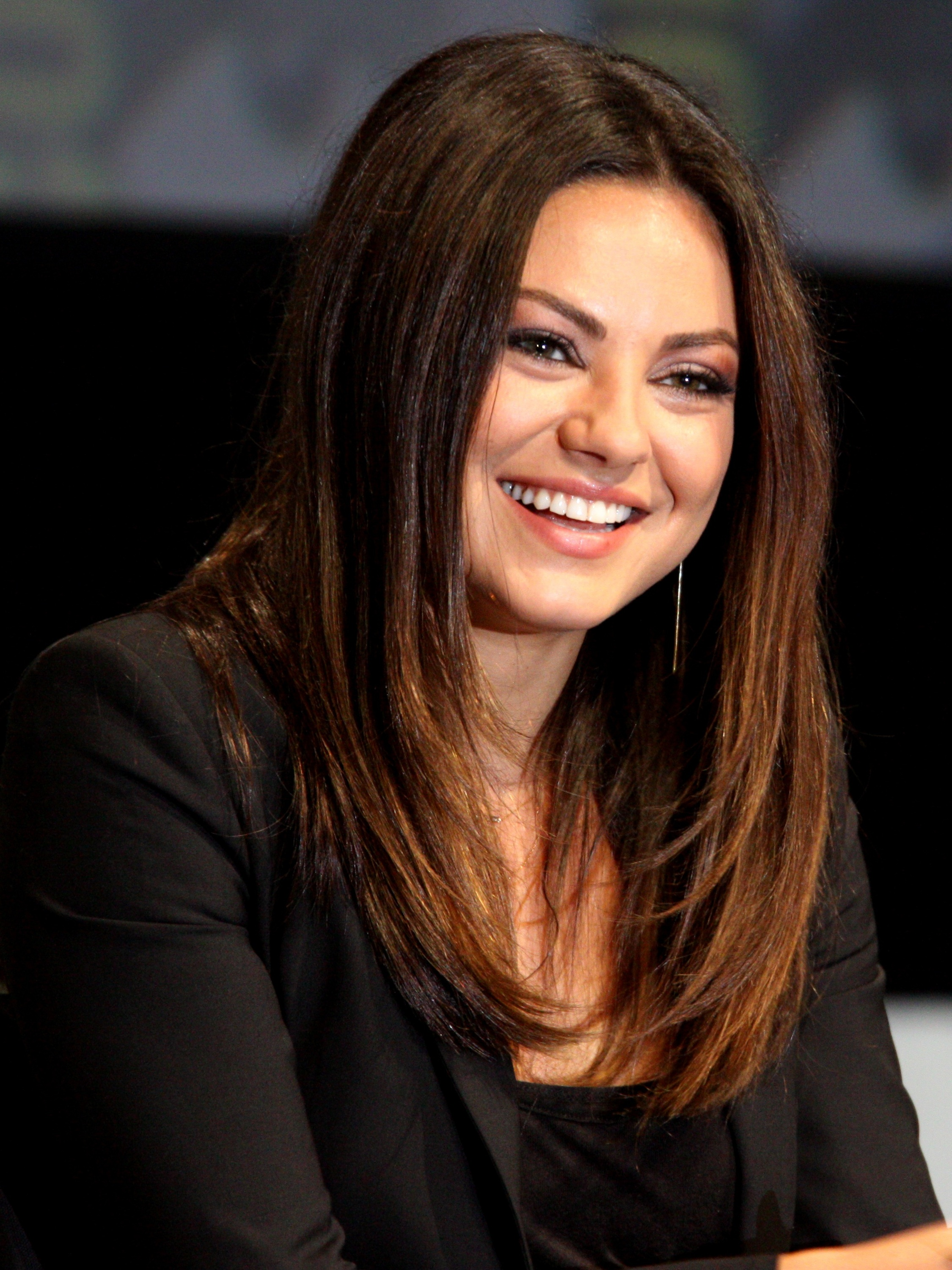
Mila Kunis
- Madeline Kahn
- Mindy Kaling discusses "enthusiastic" with Elmo
- Carol Kane
- Casey Kasem voiced various letter cartoon characters
- Julie Kavner (as Marge Simpson)
- Matt Kemp demonstrates the word "attach" with Abby Cadabby
- Anna Kendrick defines "absorb" with Elmo and Abby Cadabby
- Alicia Keys
- Chaka Khan
- Kid 'n Play
- Nicole Kidman defines "stubborn" with Oscar the Grouch
- Taran Killam
- Jimmy Kimmel defines "sibling"
- Richard Kind (playing a Balloon Fairy in episode 4088)
- B.B. King
- Billie Jean King
- Larry King
- Greg Kinnear demonstrating the word "machine"
- Reverend Frederick Douglass Kirkpatrick
- Kevin Kline
- Heidi Klum defines "compliment" with Elmo and a boot
- Gladys Knight & the Pips
- T. R. Knight – Letter "I" – Private I
- Solange Knowles
- Daniel Koren
- Jane Krakowski
- Diana Krall
- John Krasinski defines "soggy" with Murray
- Alison Krauss
- Kronos Quartet
- Mila Kunis defines "include" with Elmo and two dancing sheep

== L ==
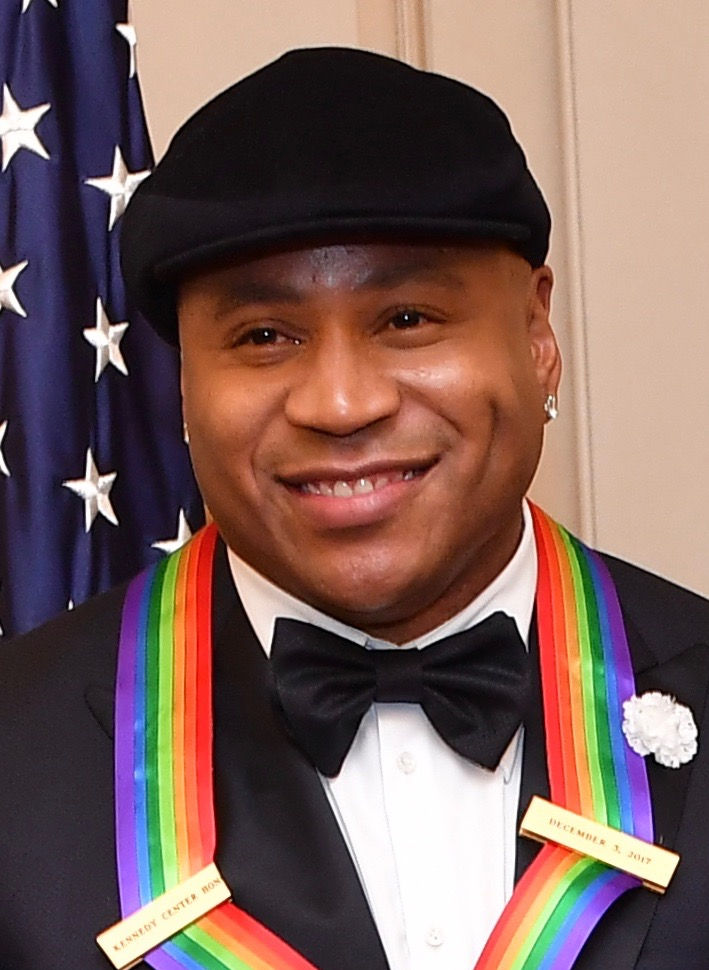
LL Cool J

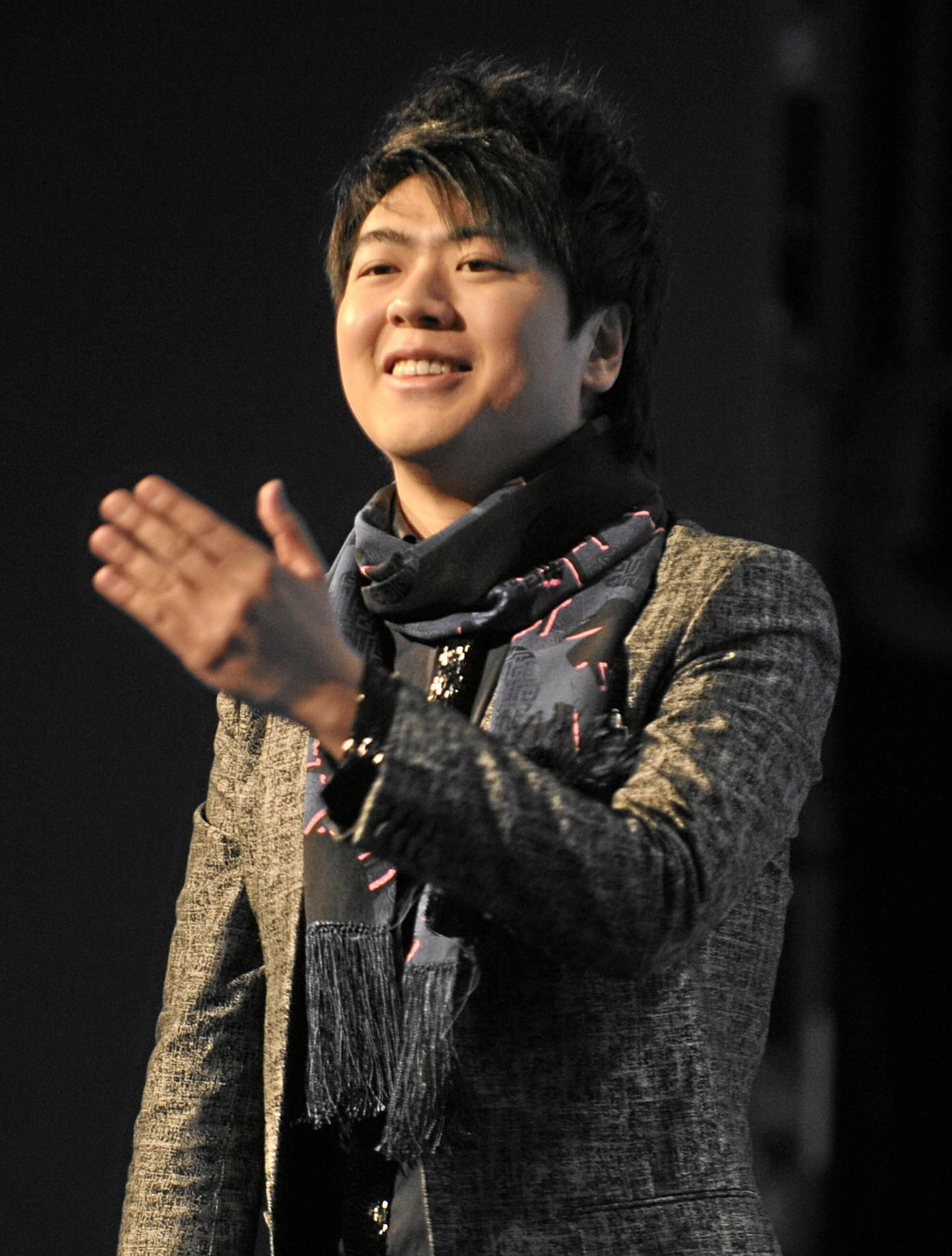
Lang Lang

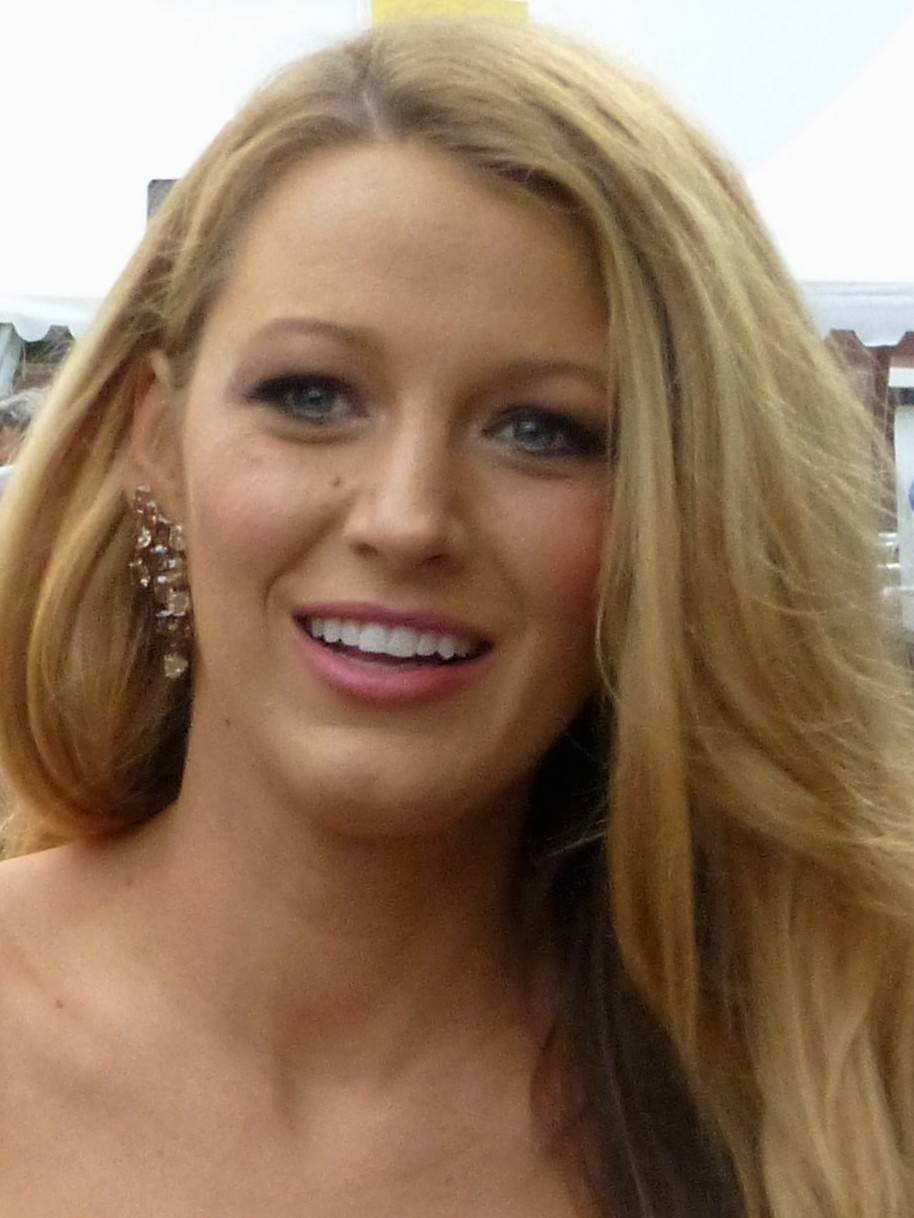
Blake Lively

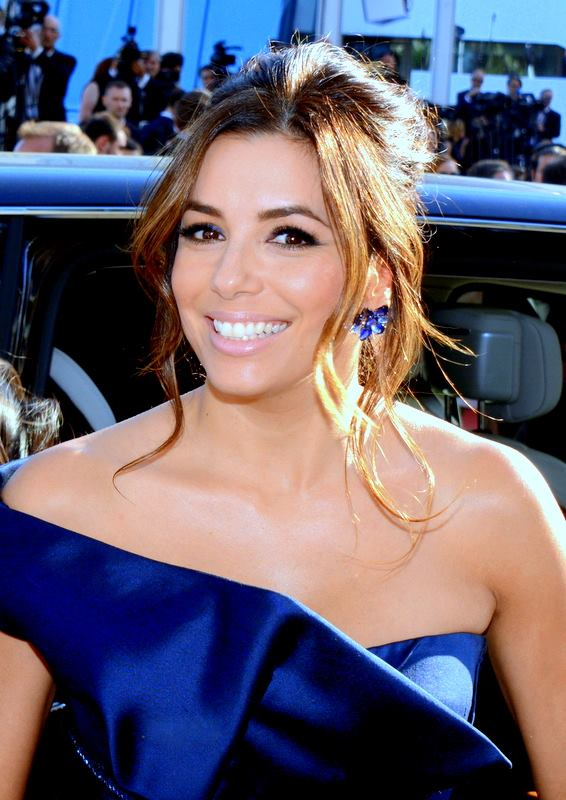
Eva Longoria

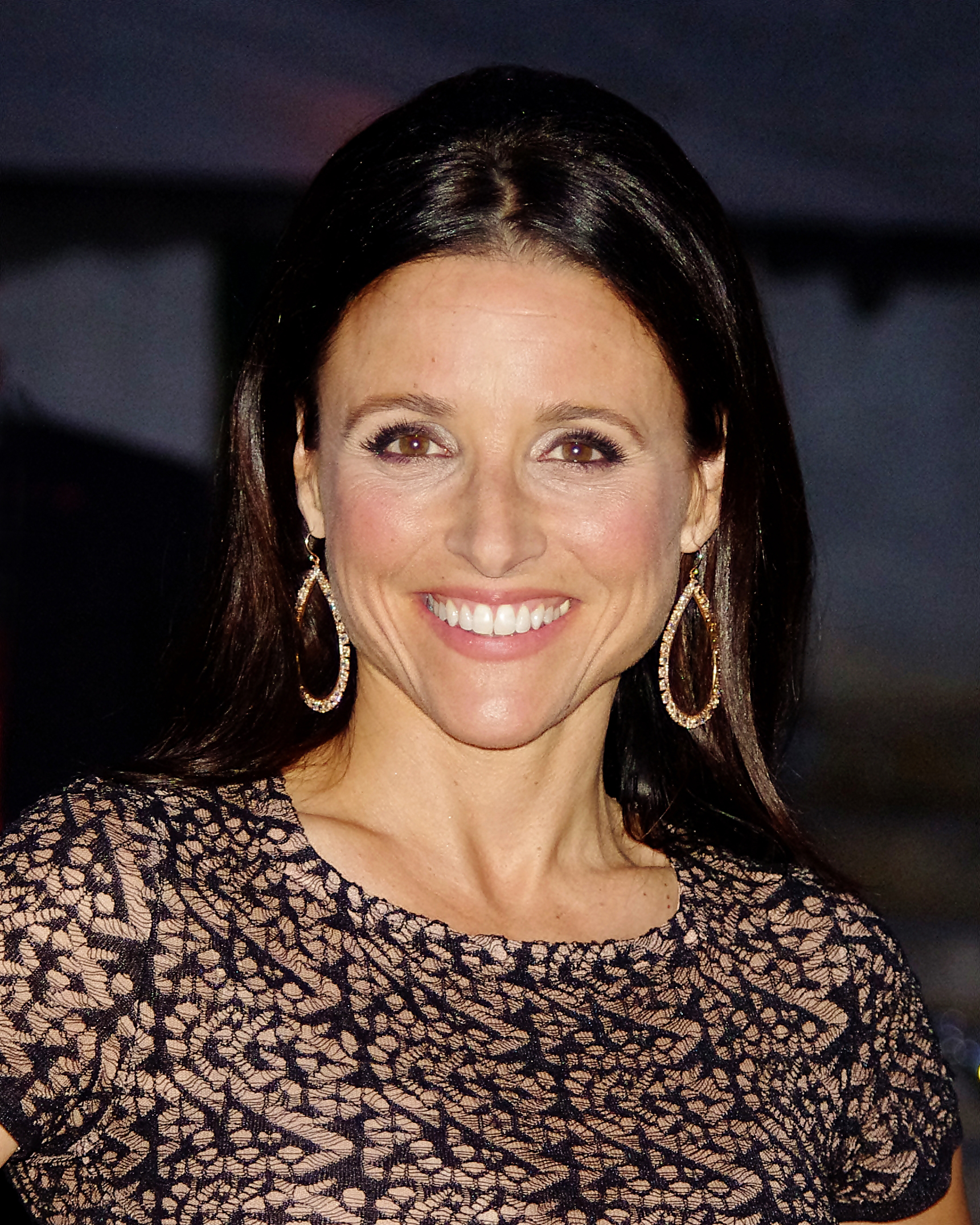
Julia Louis-Dreyfus
- Patti LaBelle
- Nick Lachey
- Ladysmith Black Mambazo
- Emeril Lagasse
- Lamb Chop (sings alphabet song, also appeared in the season 26 finale)
- Lang Lang
- Burt Lancaster
- Sean Landeta (one special): Landeta, a New York Giants player, appeared during the celebrity performance of "Put Down the Duckie" in Put Down the Duckie: The Sesame Street Special
- Michael Landon (appeared with the rest of the Bonanza cast in season 2)
- Nathan Lane sings "Sing" with the Oinker Sisters
- Queen Latifah
- Matt Lauer explains what he can do with a newspaper in episode 4136, also interviewing Cookie Monster about his decision to eat fruit.
- Jude Law demonstrating the word "cling"
- Spike Lee
- John Legend
- John Leguizamo taught Elmo about healthy vegetables.
- Jay Leno
- Zachary Levi defines the word "applause" with Elmo
- Dan Levy (Canadian actor)|Dan Levy
- * Shari Lewis (appeared with Lamb Chop in the season 26 finale)
- Little Richard
- Blake Lively
- LL Cool J sings the song "Addition Expedition" with Elmo; sings about the number 1; defines "unanimous" with Elmo and Abby Cadabby
- Rebecca Lobo
- Kenny Loggins
- Nia Long demonstrates "divide" with Abby Cadabby
- Eva Longoria demonstrating the word "exquisite"
- George Lopez defines the word "liquid" with Elmo and Abby Cadabby
- Mario Lopez appeared as a reporter for "Extra" in episode 4305
- Los Lobos
- Lindsay Lohan (appeared as a young child in "The Braid-y Bunch")
- Julia Louis-Dreyfus
- Kellan Lutz defines the word "vibrate" with Cookie Monster
- Loretta Lynn
- Evan Lysacek discusses "confidence" with Elmo
- Luxo Jr.
- MC Lyte

== M ==
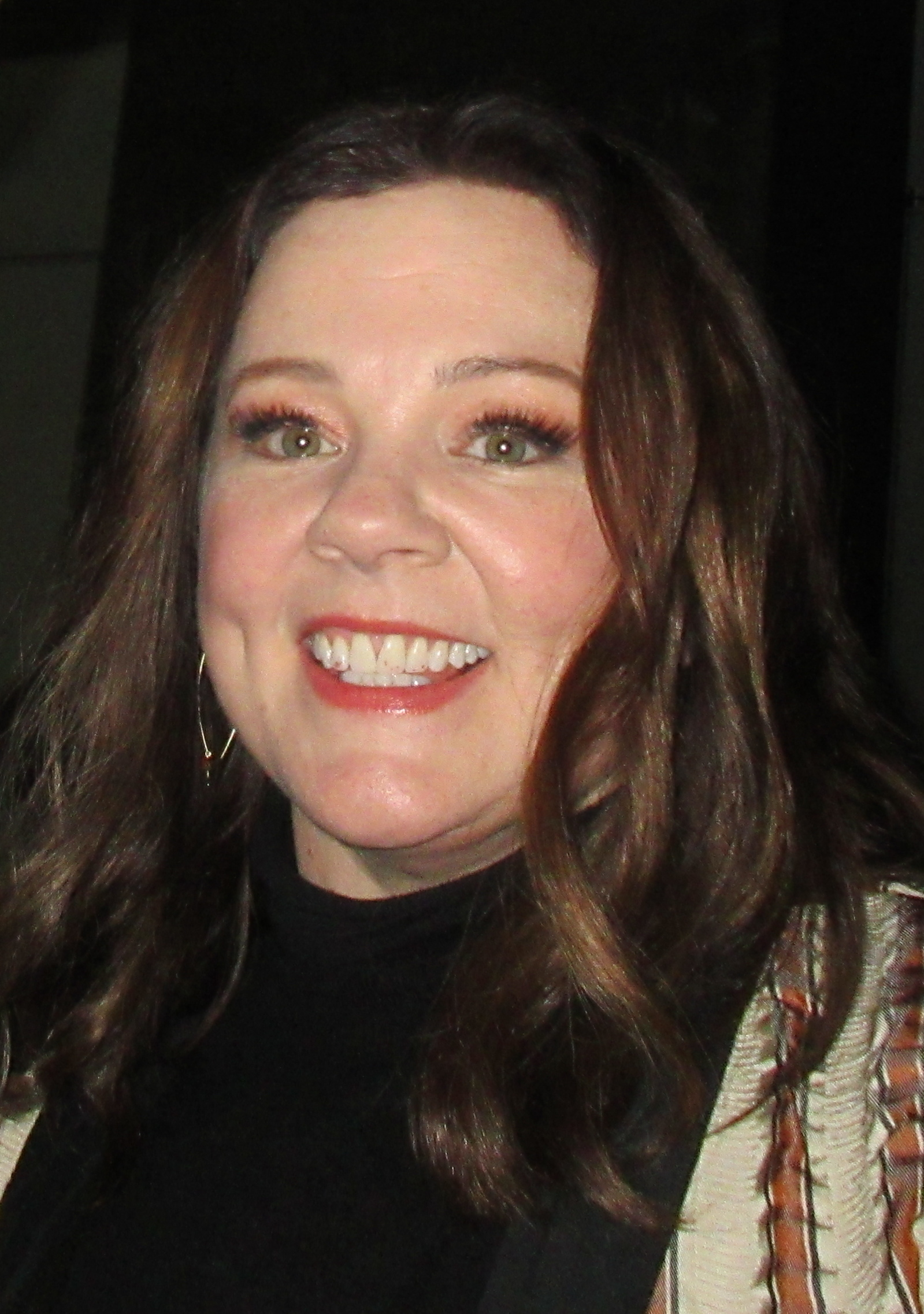
Melissa McCarthy

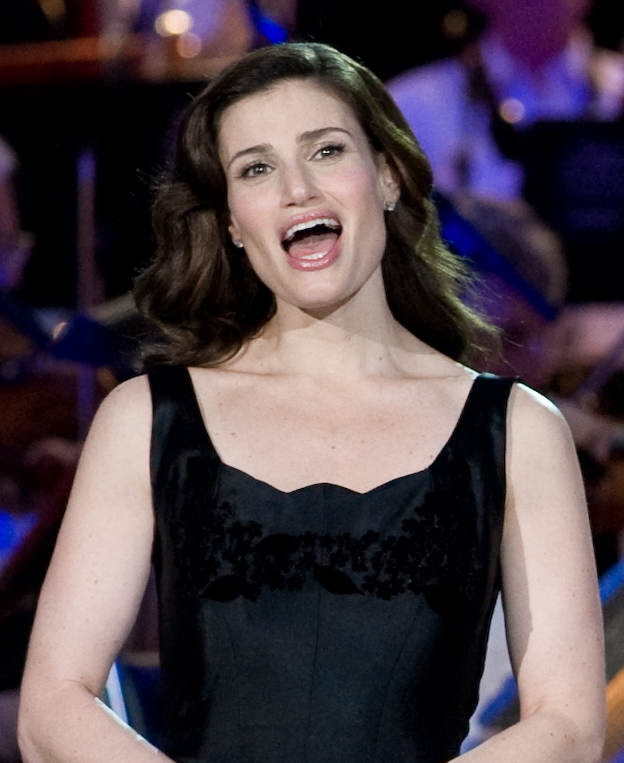
Idina Menzel

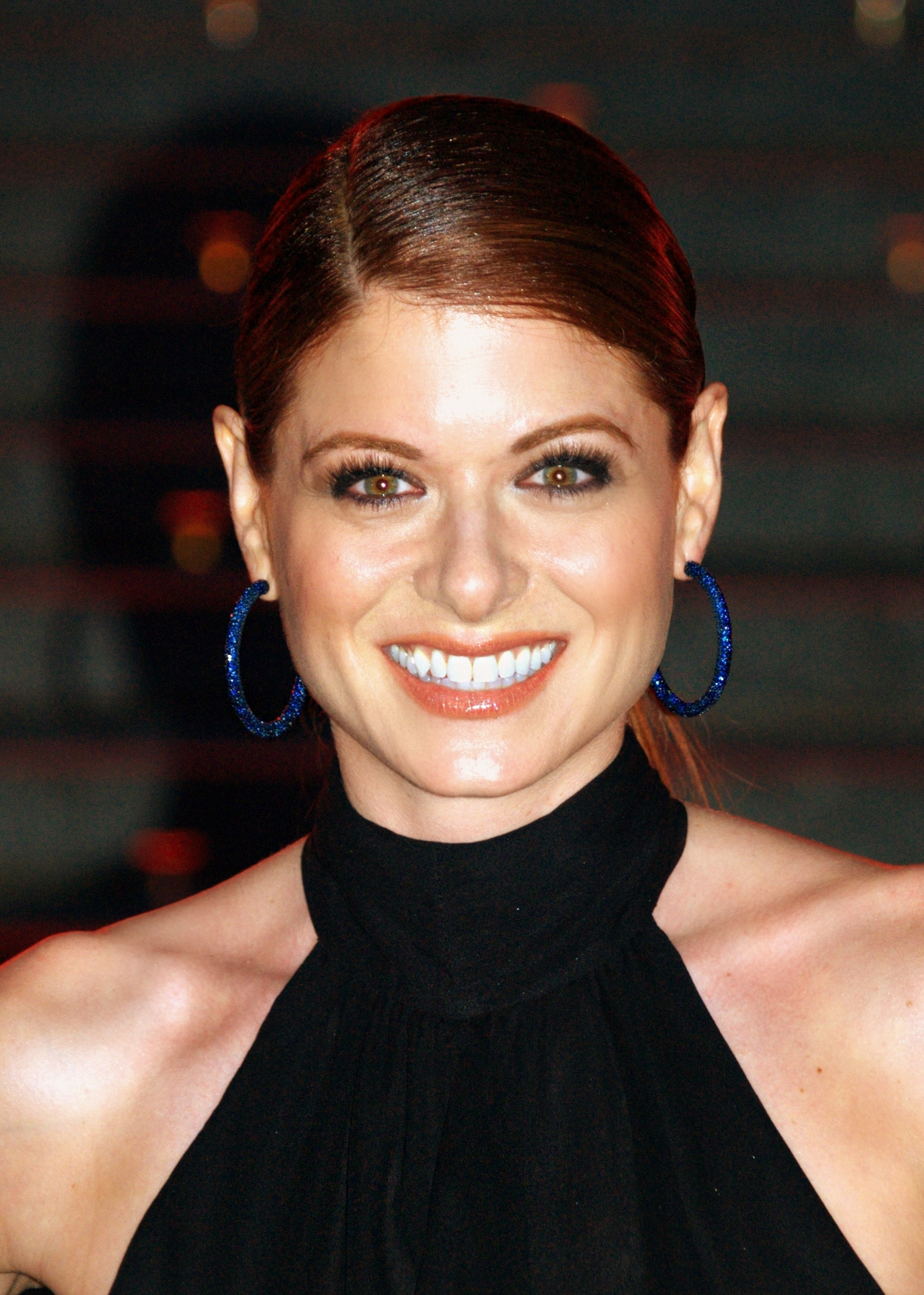
Debra Messing

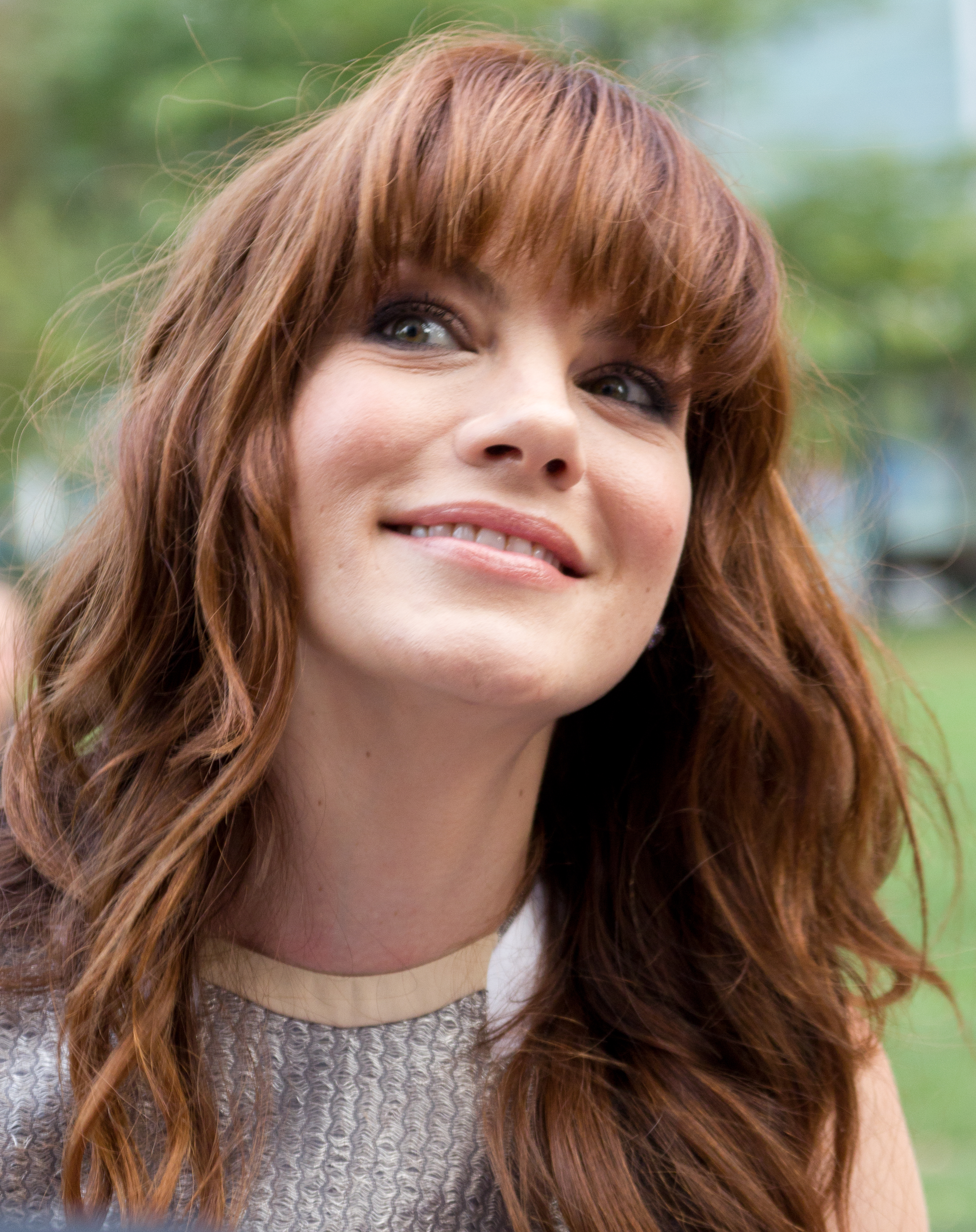
Michelle Monaghan

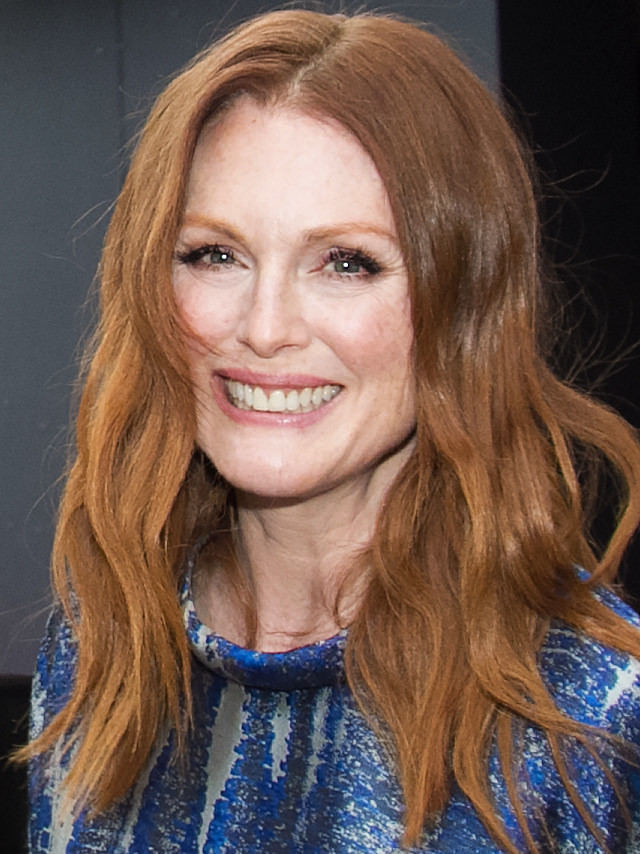
Julianne Moore
- Yo-Yo Ma
- Macklemore
- Robert MacNeil
- Main Street
- Zayn Malik (sang "What Makes U Useful" with the letter U)
- Howie Mandel demonstrates "ticklish" in episode 4143
- Eric Mangini (one segment): Mangini, the New York Jets coach, appeared in season 38 (2007), along with other Jets, Elmo, and Elmo's goldfish Dorothy
- Julianna Margulies as Dr. Berger who helps heal Big Bird's broken wing
- Cheech Marin
- Ziggy Marley
- Bruno Mars sang "Don't Give Up"
- Branford Marsalis
- Wynton Marsalis
- James Marsden defines the word "engineer" with Elmo
- Andrea Martin (appeared as Edith Prickley in several segments, guest starred as Wanda Falbo, Word Fairy, and narrated the television segments on Elmo's World)
- J. R. Martinez
- Michael Masser
- Marlee Matlin sings with Billy Joel
- Dave Matthews sings "I Need a Word" with Grover on the start of the 44th season on September 16, 2013
- John Mayer in a Primetime Special that appeared on April 1, 2009
- Whitman Mayo
- Debi Mazar defining "humongous" in episode 4211
- Jack McBrayer
- Martina McBride sang "That's Pretending" with Elmo
- Jenny McCarthy imitating several sorts of insect
- Melissa McCarthy discusses "choreographer" with Elmo
- Jesse McCartney
- Tim McCarver
- Audra McDonald
- Frances McDormand as a fictionalized version of herself working as a department store worker (from the television special/VHS release Big Bird Gets Lost)
- Bobby McFerrin
- Phil McGraw co-hosting with Dr. Feel
- Tim McGraw sang about sharing with his wife, Faith Hill
- Ewan McGregor
- Joel McHale defines "prickly"
- Michael McKean Rock, Rock Band (episode 4234, season 41)
- Ian McKellen defining "resist", tries to make Cookie Monster resist from eating a cookie
- Don McLean
- Wendi McLendon-Covey demonstrates "strenuous" with Elmo
- Christopher Meloni
- Maria Menounos defines "senses"
- Menudo
- Idina Menzel (with Taye Diggs) explain the word "allergic"
- Natalie Merchant
- Ethel Merman
- Debra Messing defines "nature"
- Seth Meyers discusses "greeting" with Count von Count
- MF Grimm
- Lin-Manuel Miranda as Freddy Flapman in episode 4187
- Ella Mitchell
- Jay Mohr defines the word "tool" in episode 4308
- Janelle Monáe sings "The Power of Yet"
- Michelle Monaghan defines "fascinating" with Abby Cadabby
- Julianne Moore
- Natalie Morales defines the word "float" with Abby Cadabby
- Rick Moranis
- Rita Moreno
- Mark Morris
- Michael Moschen
- John Moschitta Jr. (appeared in season 16 as a man whose children's names have a name beginning with every letter, as well as a spokesman for "Peter Piper's P Products")
- Zero Mostel
- Bobby Moynihan appeared as Quacker Duck Man in episode 4325
- Jason Mraz sings "Outdoors" (to the tune of his hit "I'm Yours") with Sesame Street friends about going outside
- Megan Mullally defines the word "distract"
- Mummenschanz
- Anne Murray
- Kacey Musgraves
- Mike Myers

== N ==
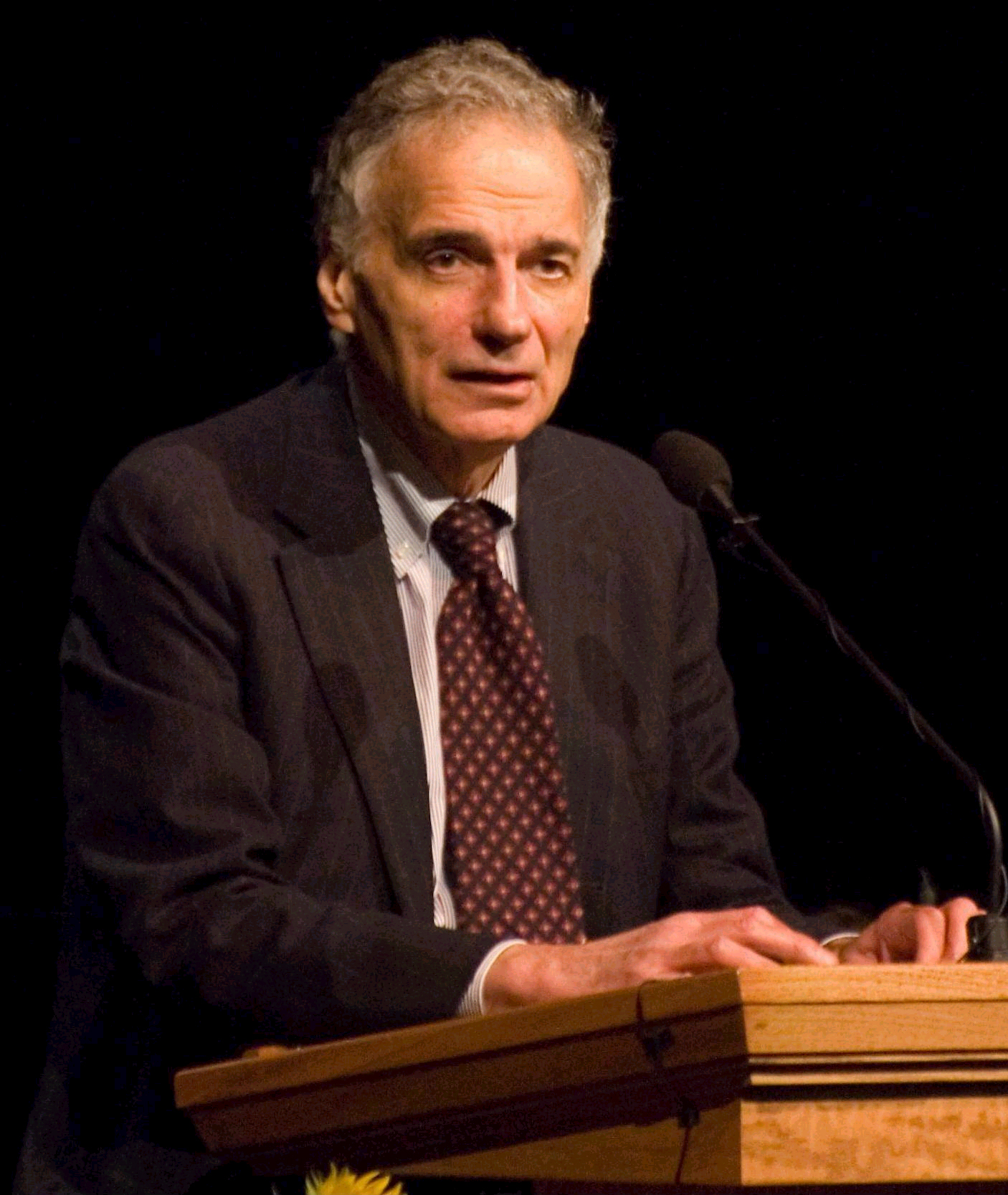
Ralph Nader

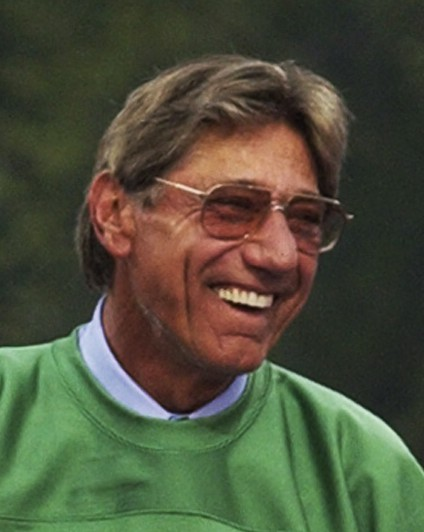
Joe Namath

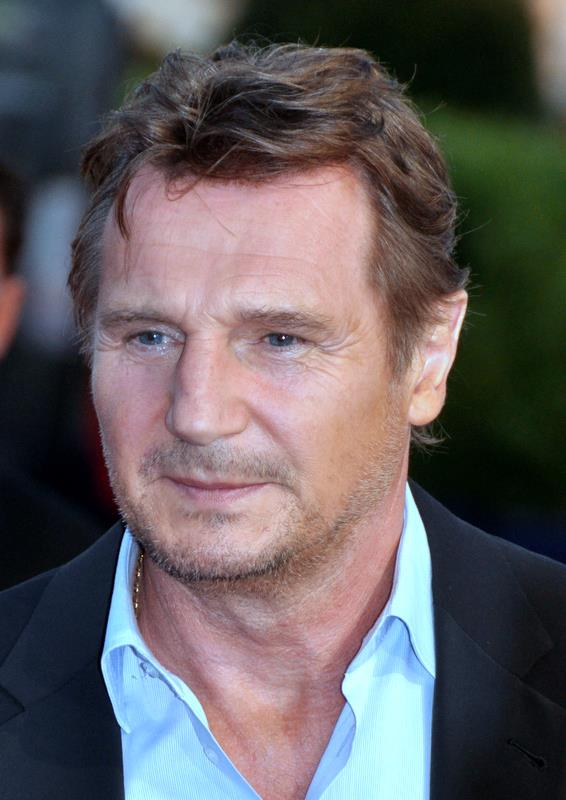
Liam Neeson

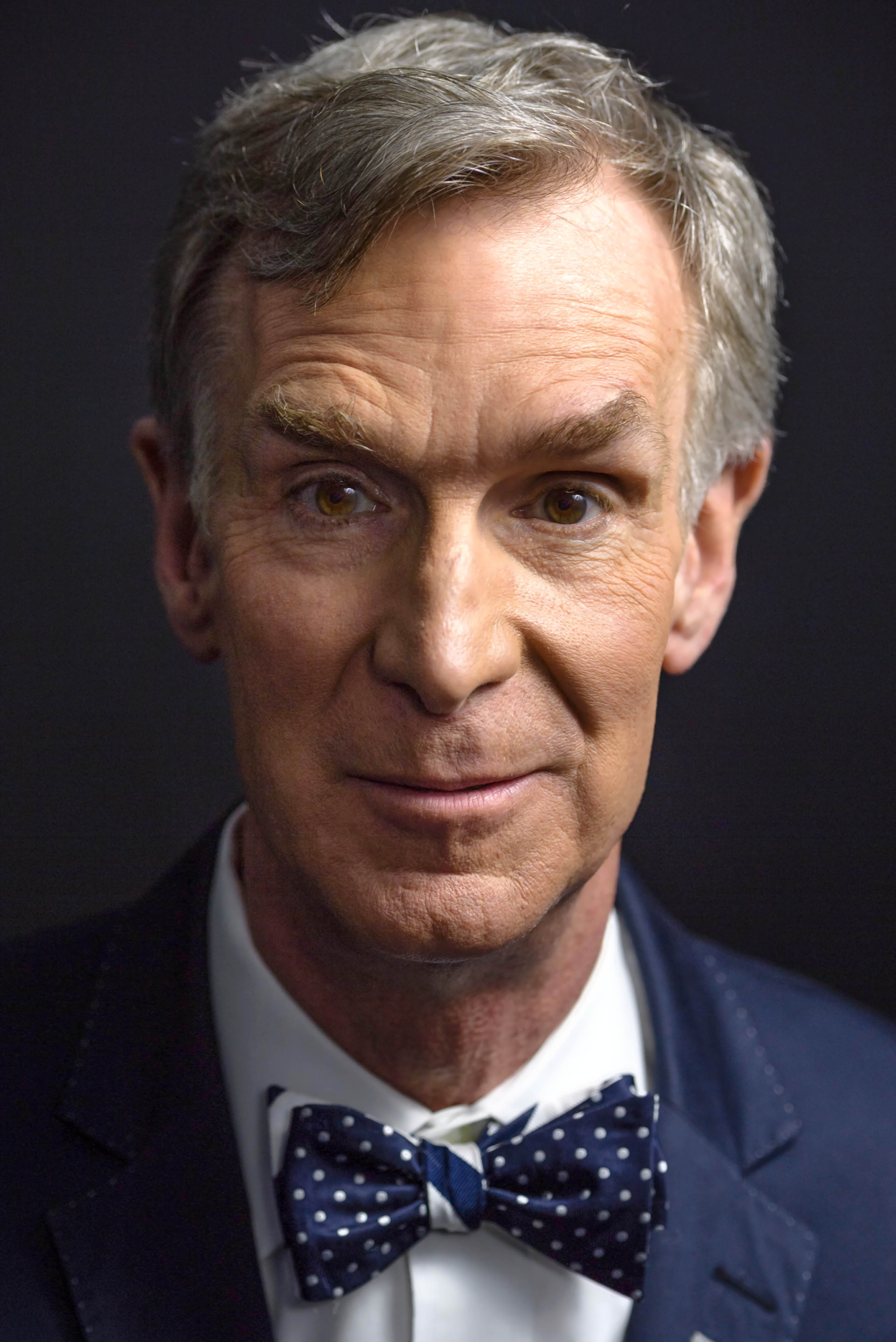
Bill Nye

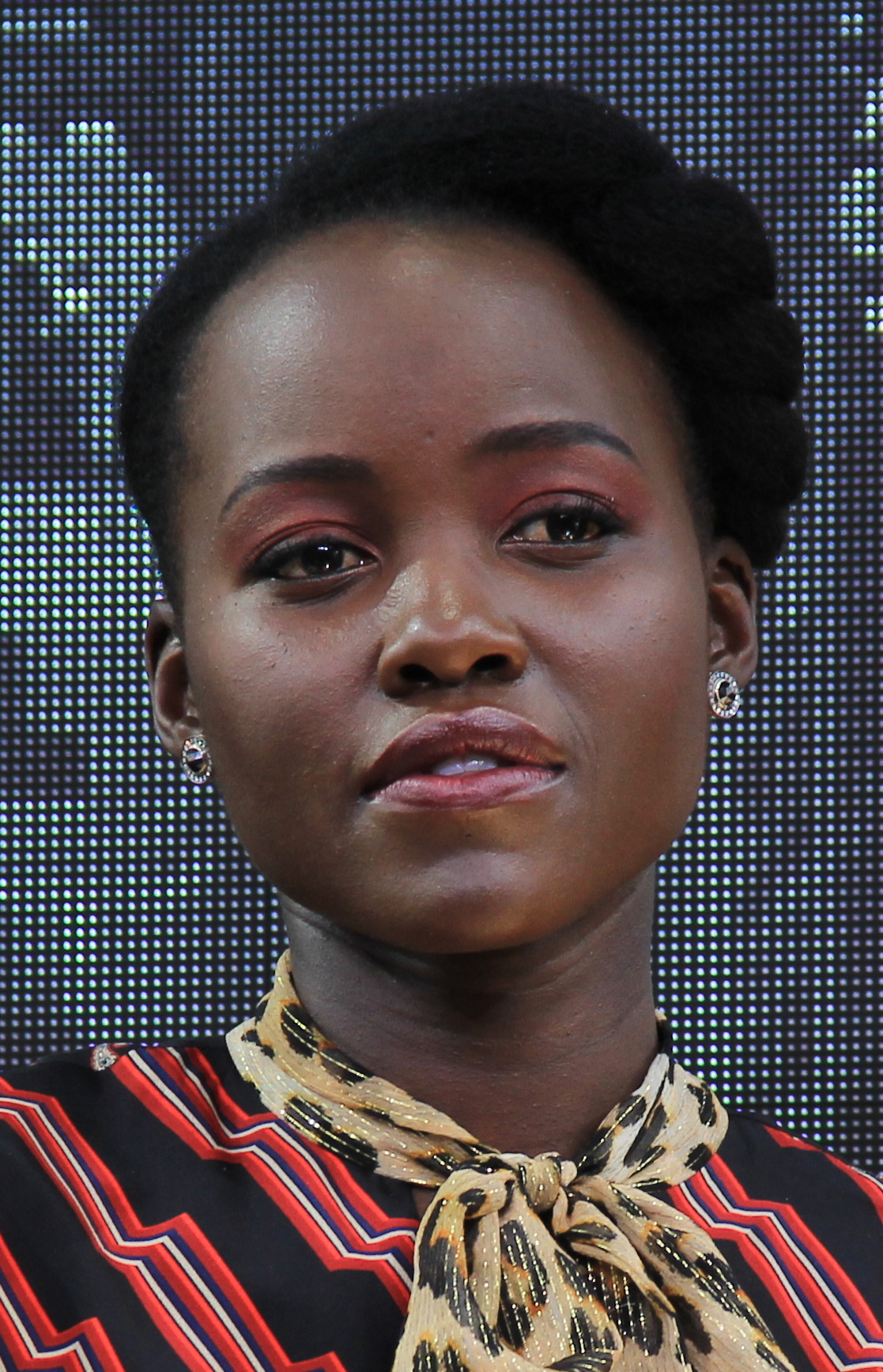
Lupita Nyong'o
- Jim Nabors (recited the alphabet in season 2)
- Ralph Nader appeared singing "People in Your Neighborhood" in Put Down the Duckie: The Sesame Street Special, 1988.
- Kathy Najimy
- Joe Namath
- National Theatre of the Deaf
- Martina Navratilova
- Kunal Nayyar defines "robot" with Grover and a robot
- Ne-Yo
- Liam Neeson (appeared reciting the alphabet for Ernie in season 30)
- Karl Nelson (one special): Nelson, a New York Giants player, appeared during the celebrity performance of "Put Down the Duckie" in Put Down the Duckie: The Sesame Street Special
- Aaron Neville
- New York City Ballet
- New York Philharmonic
- Fred Newman (appeared in an episode of Elmo's World to talk about things that he can do with his mouth)
- Laraine Newman
- Soichi Noguchi
- Brandy Norwood
- Bill Nye
- Lupita Nyong'o and Elmo talk about skin
- NSYNC

== O ==
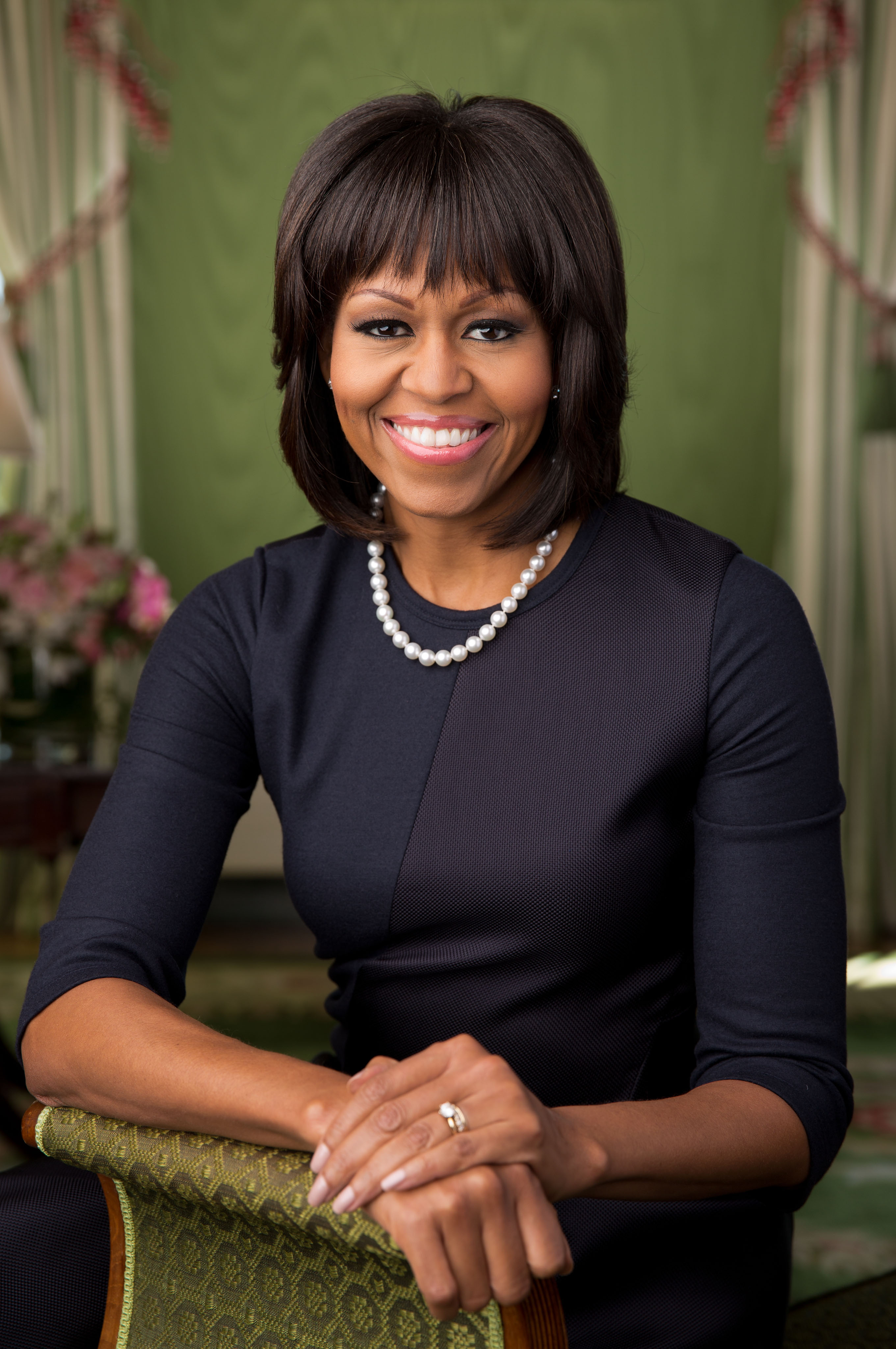
Michelle Obama

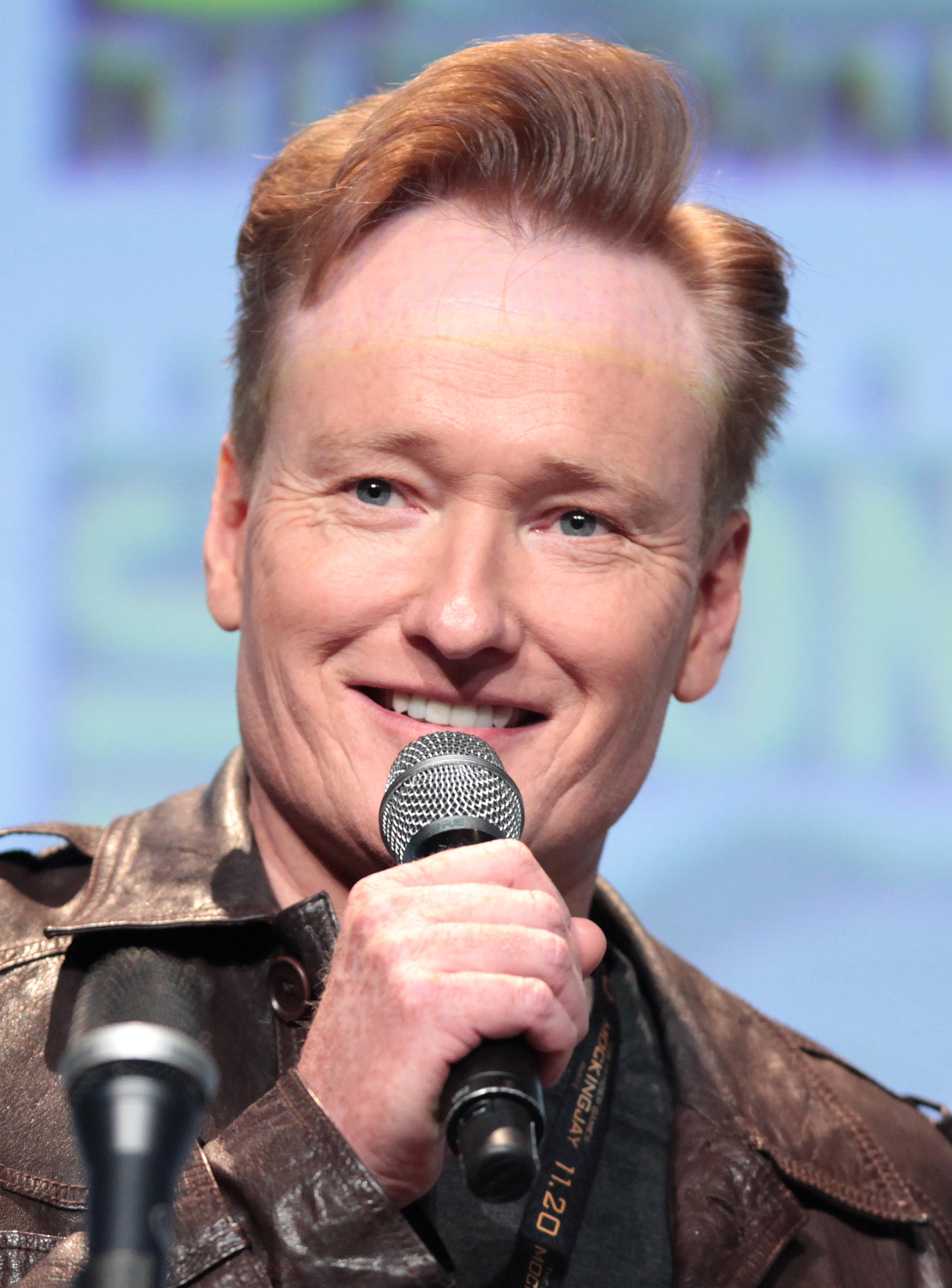
Conan O'Brien

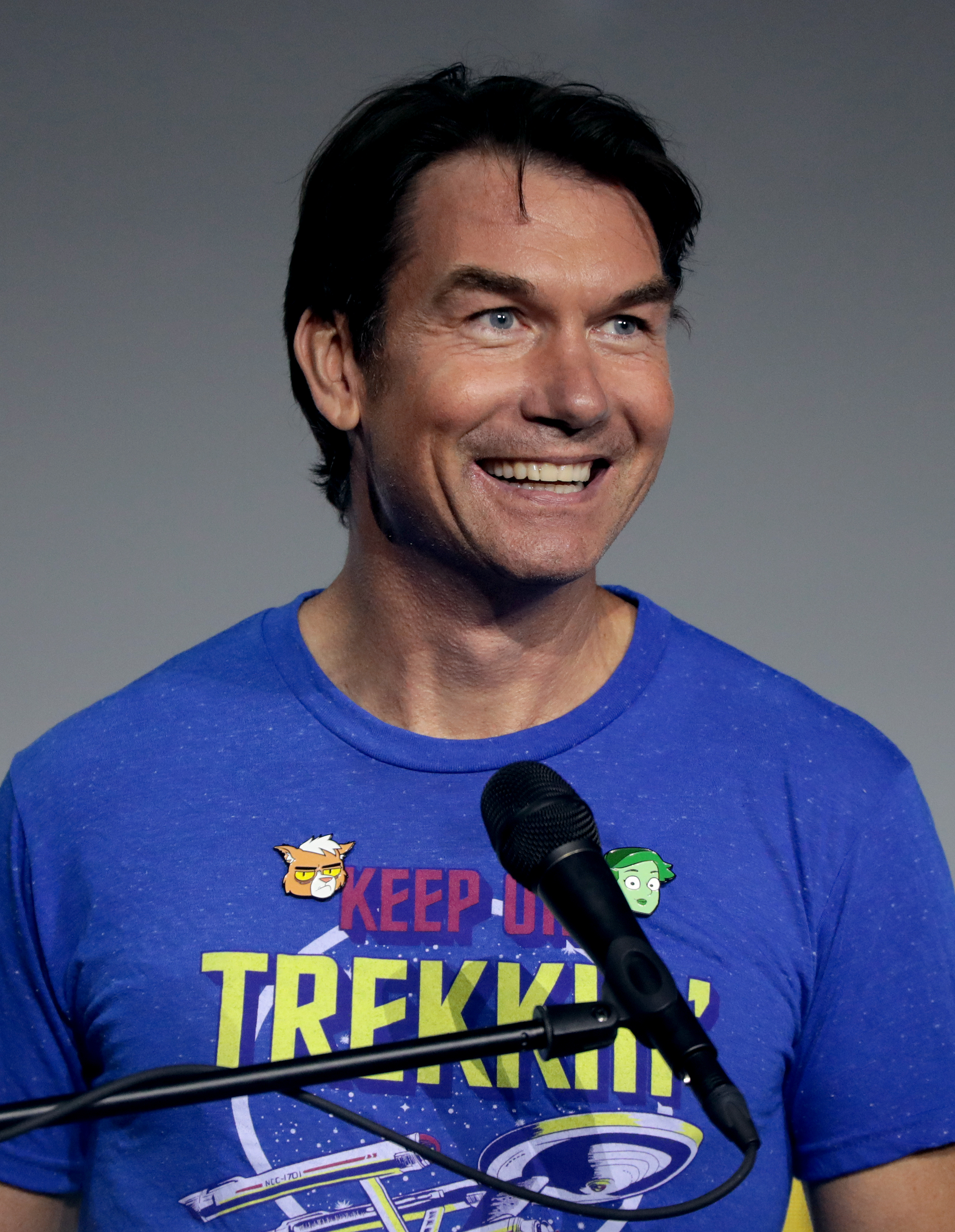
Jerry O'Connell

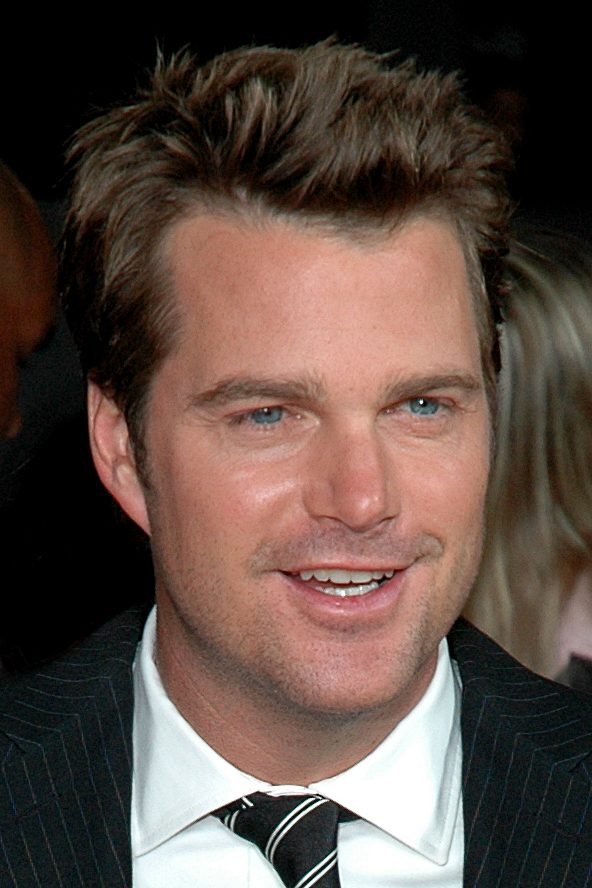
Chris O'Donnell

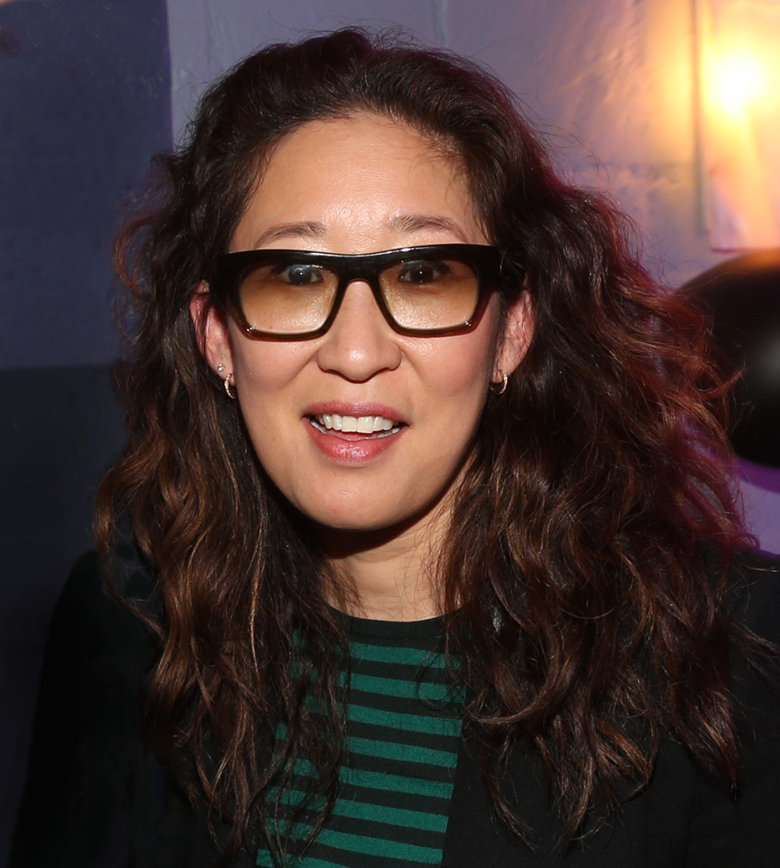
Sandra Oh

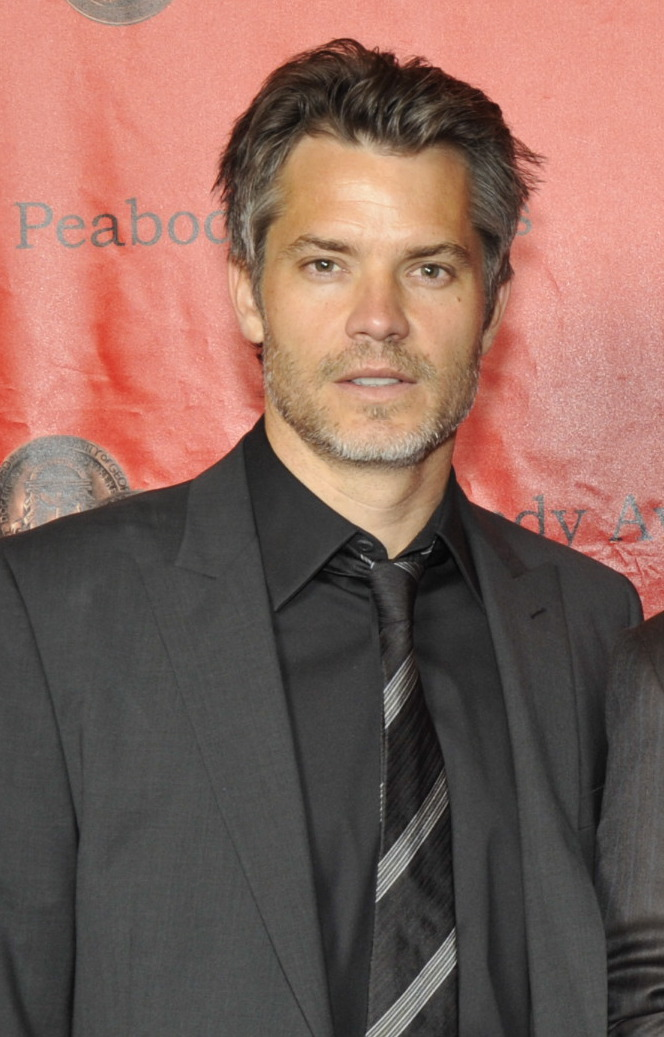
Timothy Olyphant
- Michelle Obama shows kids how to plant vegetables
- Conan O'Brien (one segment, two specials): O'Brien has guested on Sesame Street itself, as well as two special productions. While trying to deliver a tape in the Elmopalooza special, Big Bird runs through the set of Late Night with Conan O'Brien, where he is interviewing the Yip Yips; also seen is Andy Richter. O'Brien appeared in a celebrity montage of "Sing", for 2004 DVD What's the Name of That Song.
- Jerry O'Connell demonstrates "observe" with Murray
- Nancy O'Dell defines the word "pollinate"
- Chris O'Donnell defines the word "activate"
- Rosie O'Donnell
- Sandra Oh as a Cookie Fairy (episode 4184)
- OK Go
- Timothy Olyphant discusses "proud" with Abby Cadabby
- Naomi Osaka
- Jeffrey Osborne
- Donny Osmond
- Seiji Ozawa conducted The Italian Street Song as sung by Senior Placido Flamingo and the All-Animal Orchestra.

== P ==
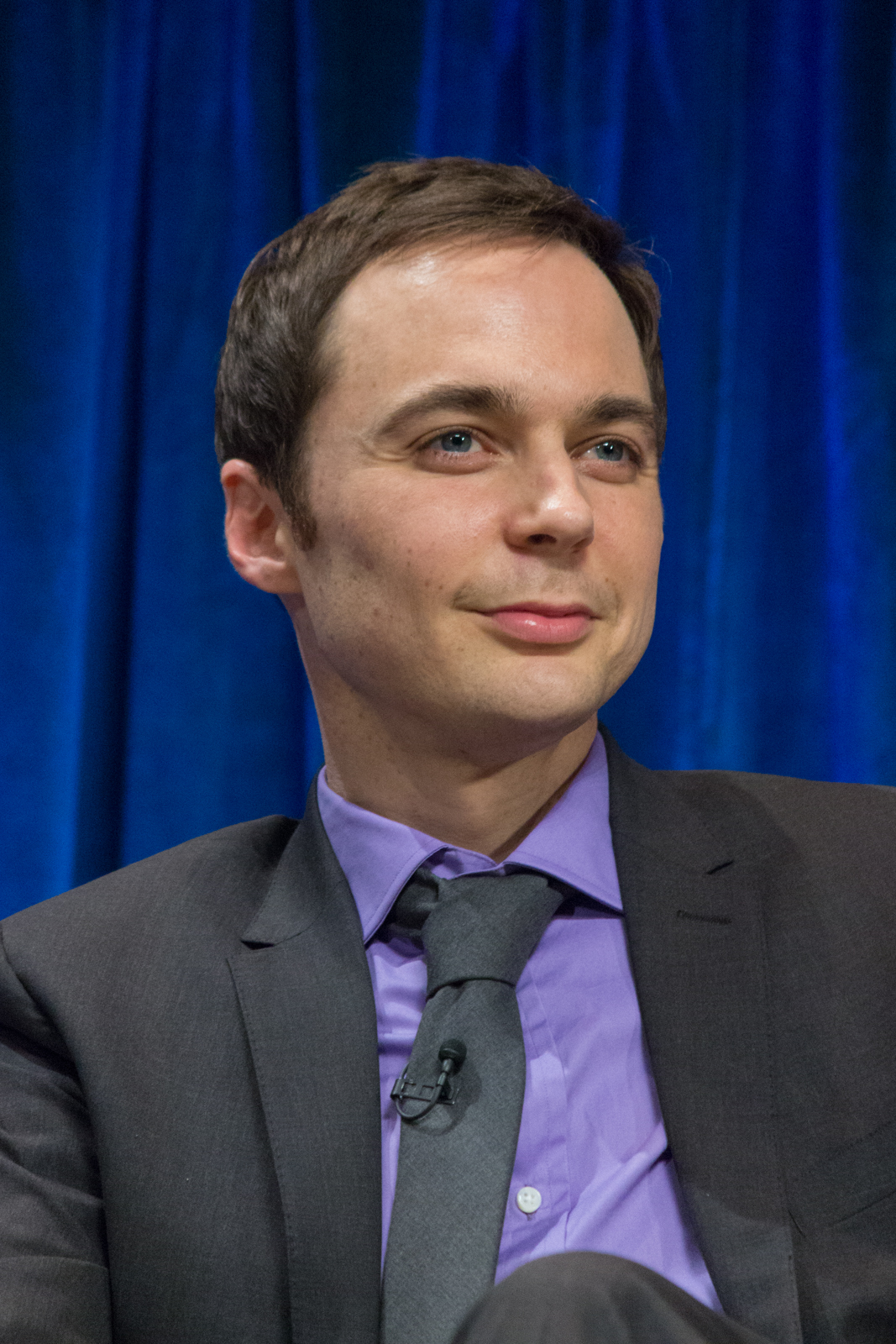
Jim Parsons

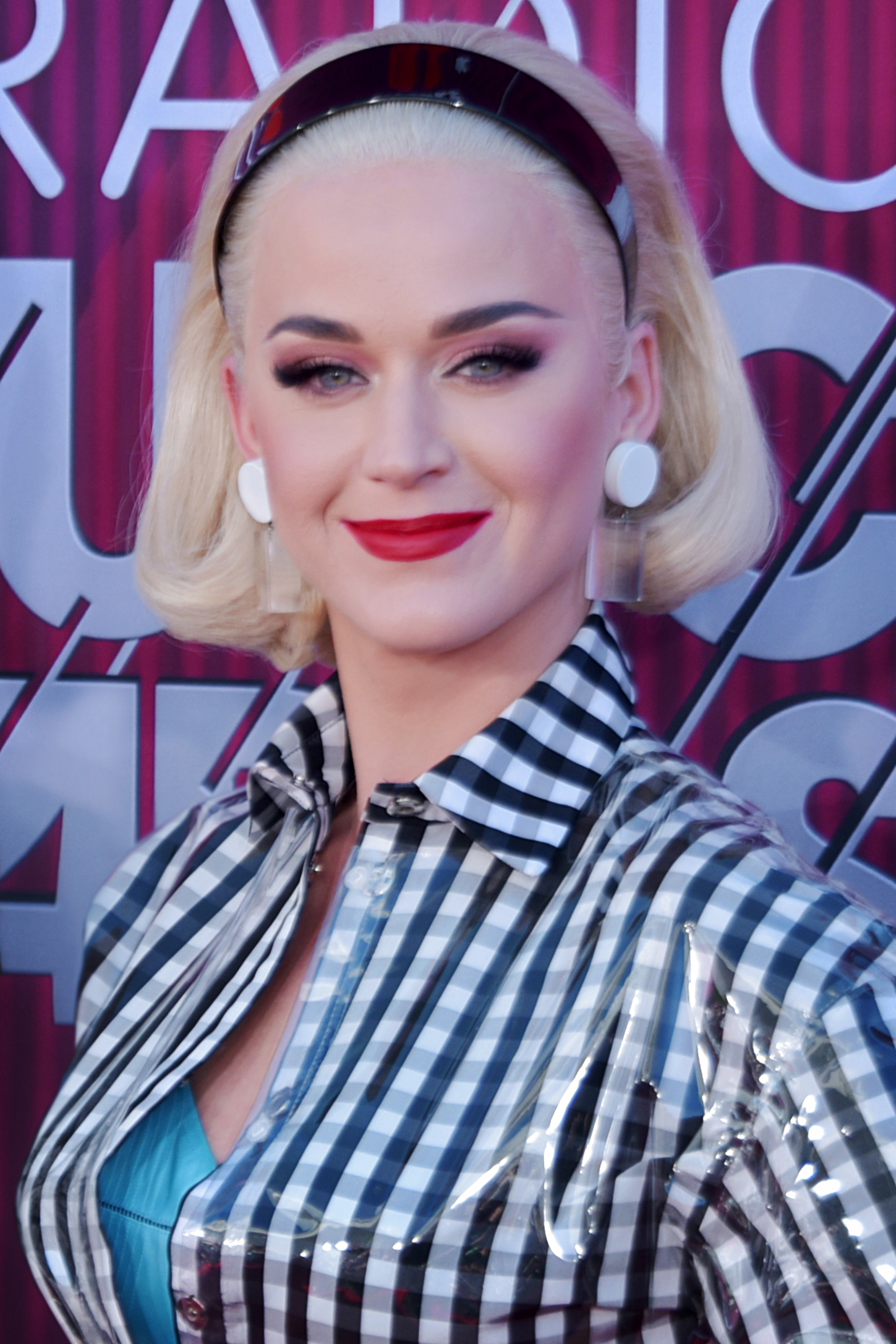
Katy Perry

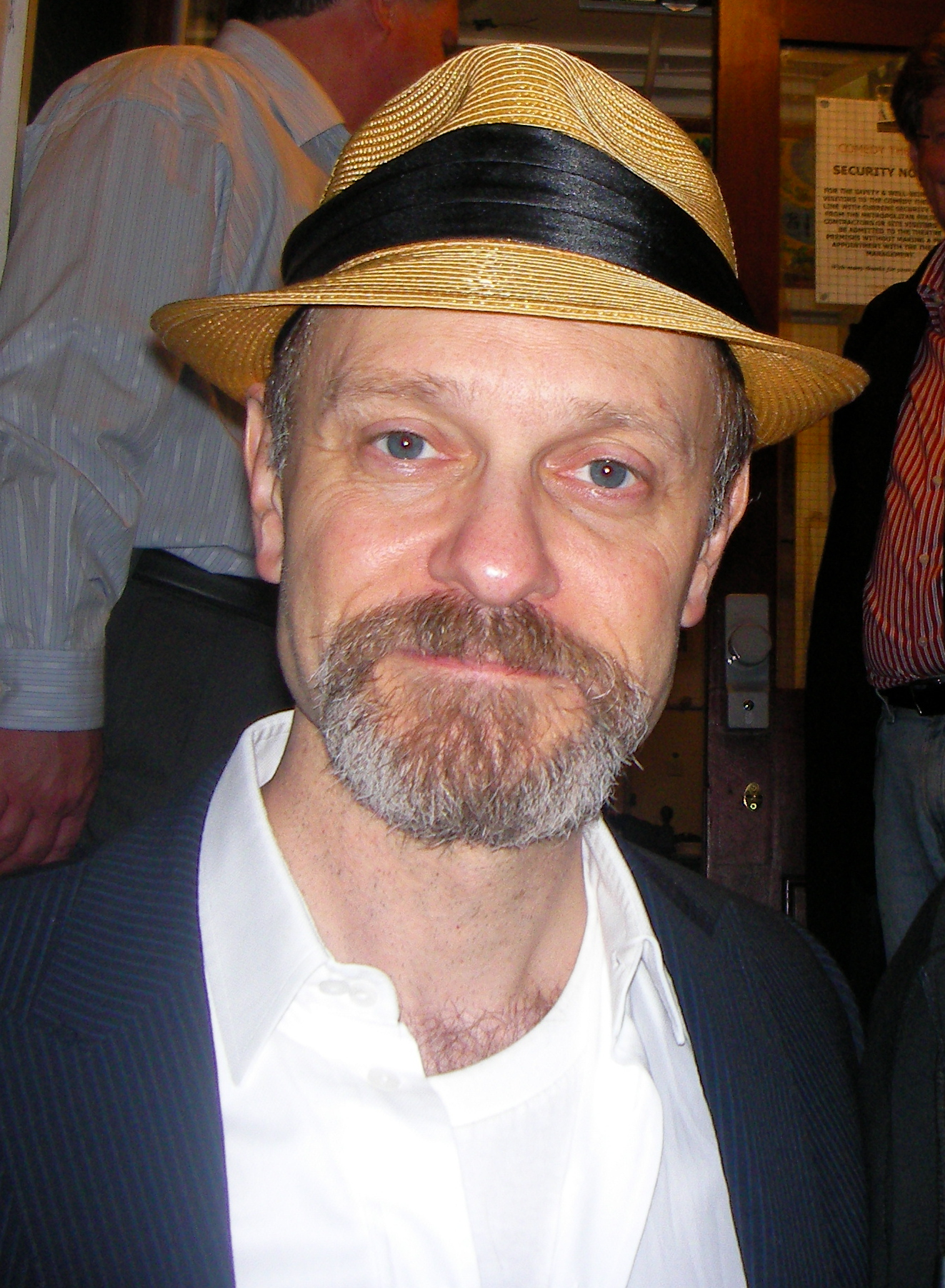
David Hyde Pierce

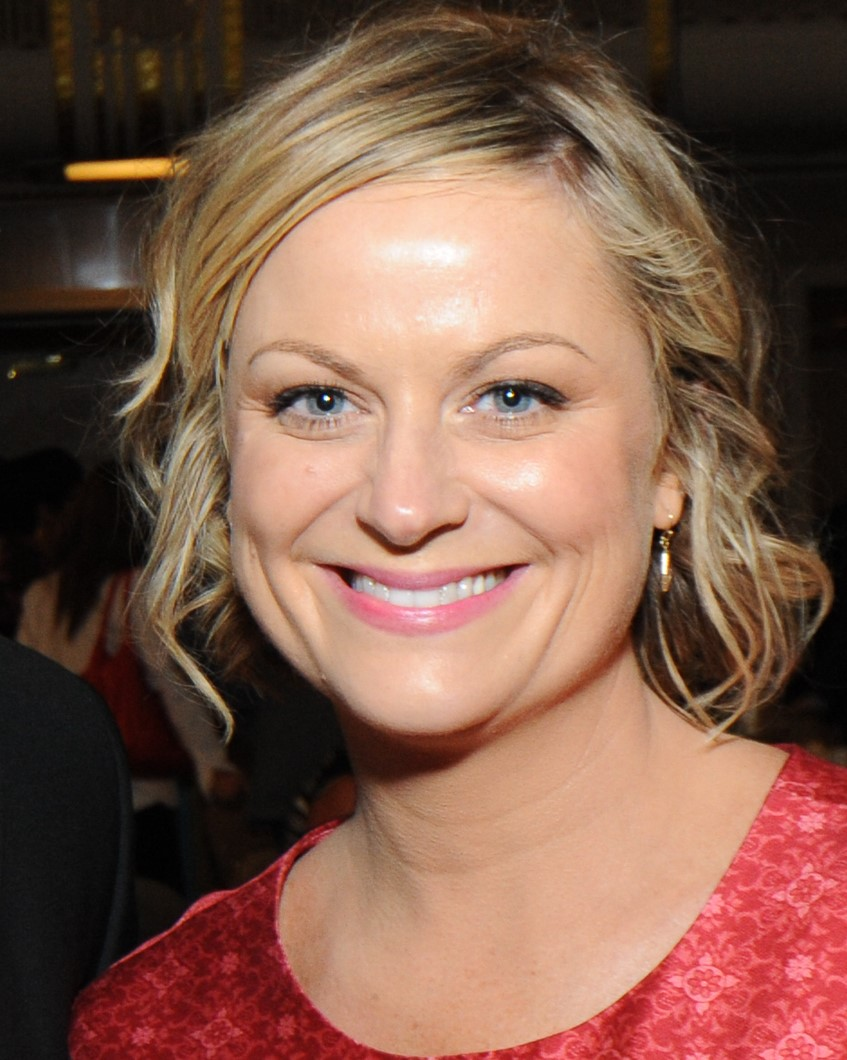
Amy Poehler

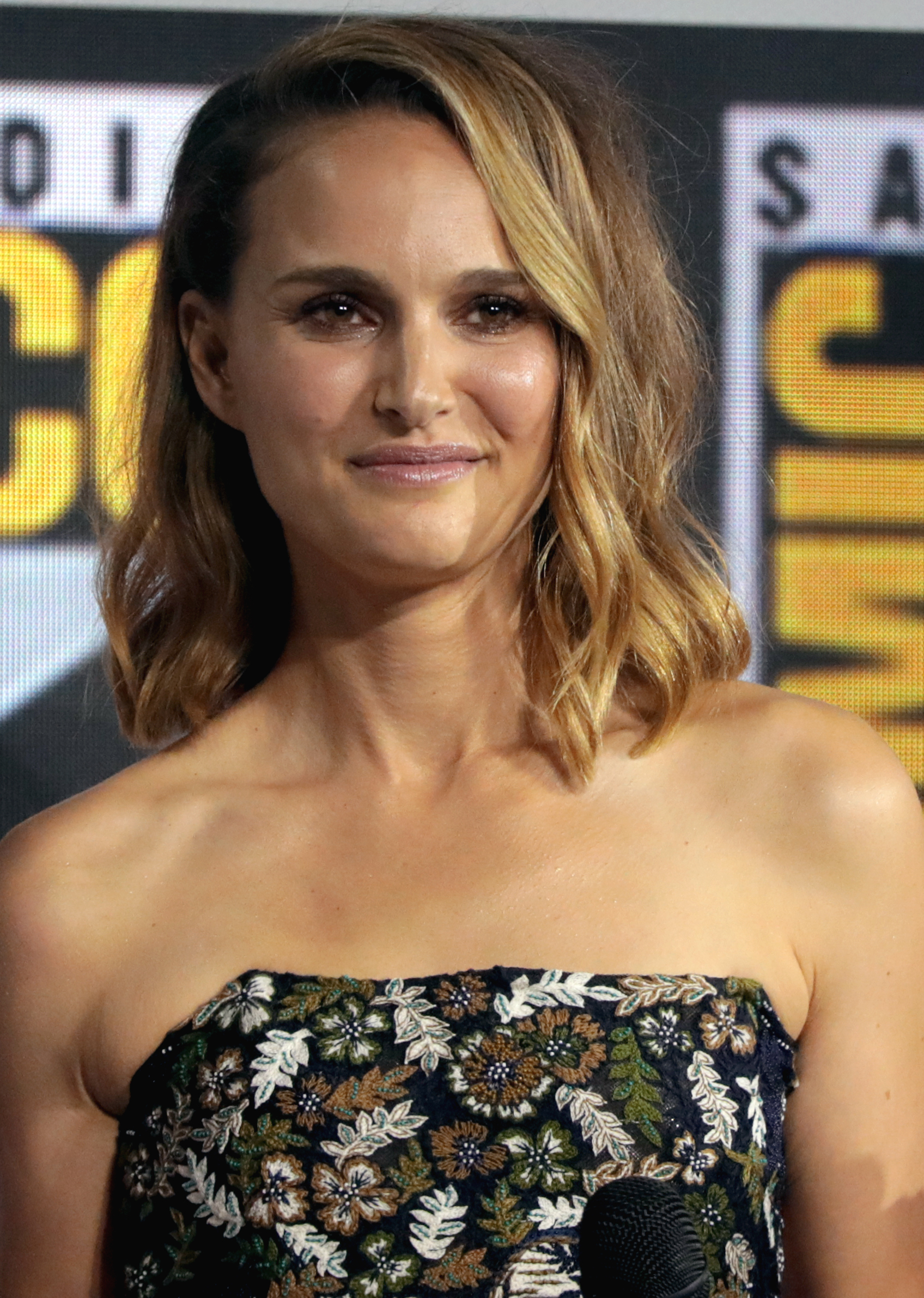
Natalie Portman
- Brad Paisley
- Keke Palmer
- Sarah Jessica Parker demonstrates "sighing" and "pair" with Elmo; looks for "big" with Super Grover
- Jim Parsons explains the word "arachnid"
- Paula Patton defines the word "innovation" with Elmo
- Pat Paulsen (made several appearances in season 2)
- Liam Payne (sang "What Makes U Useful" with the letter U)
- Pelé in Villa Sesamo
- Kal Penn
- Fred Penner sings 'I Had a Rooster' and 'The Cat Came Back' on "Canadian Sesame Street"
- Chad Pennington (one segment): Pennington, a New York Jets player, appeared in season 38 (2007), along with other Jets, Elmo, and Elmo's goldfish Dorothy
- Ty Pennington
- Pentatonix
- Itzhak Perlman (gave Telly a violin lesson)
- Rhea Perlman (as the "old woman who lived in a shoe" that landed on Big Bird's nest after a hurricane, also appeared with husband Danny DeVito in the 25th anniversary special)
- Katy Perry appeared in a skit with Elmo parodying her song "Hot n Cold". The skit was intended to air on the actual series, but the producers overturned their decision due to parent's reaction to Perry's revealing wardrobe.
- Tyler Perry
- Joe Pesci (appeared as "Ronald Grump" in the 25th anniversary special)
- Lucky Peterson
- Regis Philbin
- Lou Diamond Phillips
- David Hyde Pierce
- The Pink Panther (demonstrated the letter K in season 2)
- Amy Poehler demonstrates "challenge" with Elmo
- The Pointer Sisters: Ruth, Anita, Bonnie, and June singing pinball Number count
- Troy Polamalu discusses "fragrance" with Elmo
- Ellen Pompeo teaching the word "healthy" with Elmo
- John Popper
- Billy Porter
- Natalie Portman plays "Princess and the Elephant" with Elmo; fills in for Alan at Hooper's when he goes on vacation to Hawaii
- Richard Pryor (recited the alphabet)
- Tito Puente (a song of his was also used as background music in a segment about snow cones)
- Albert Pujols discusses "athlete" with Grover
- Keshia Knight Pulliam

== Q ==
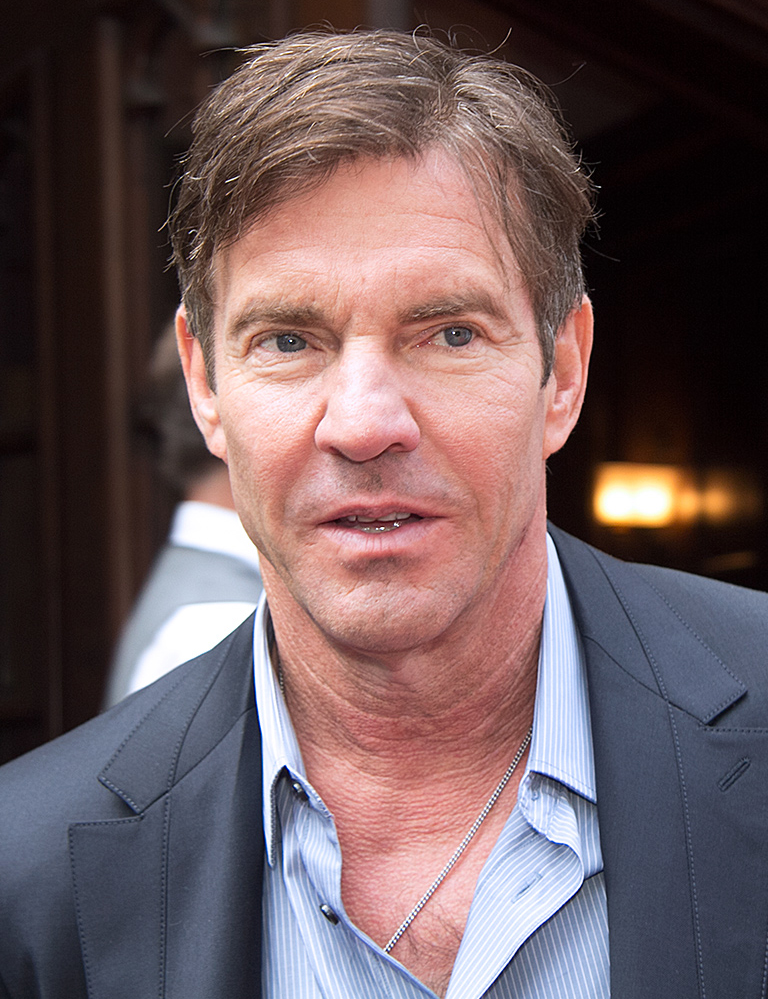
Dennis Quaid

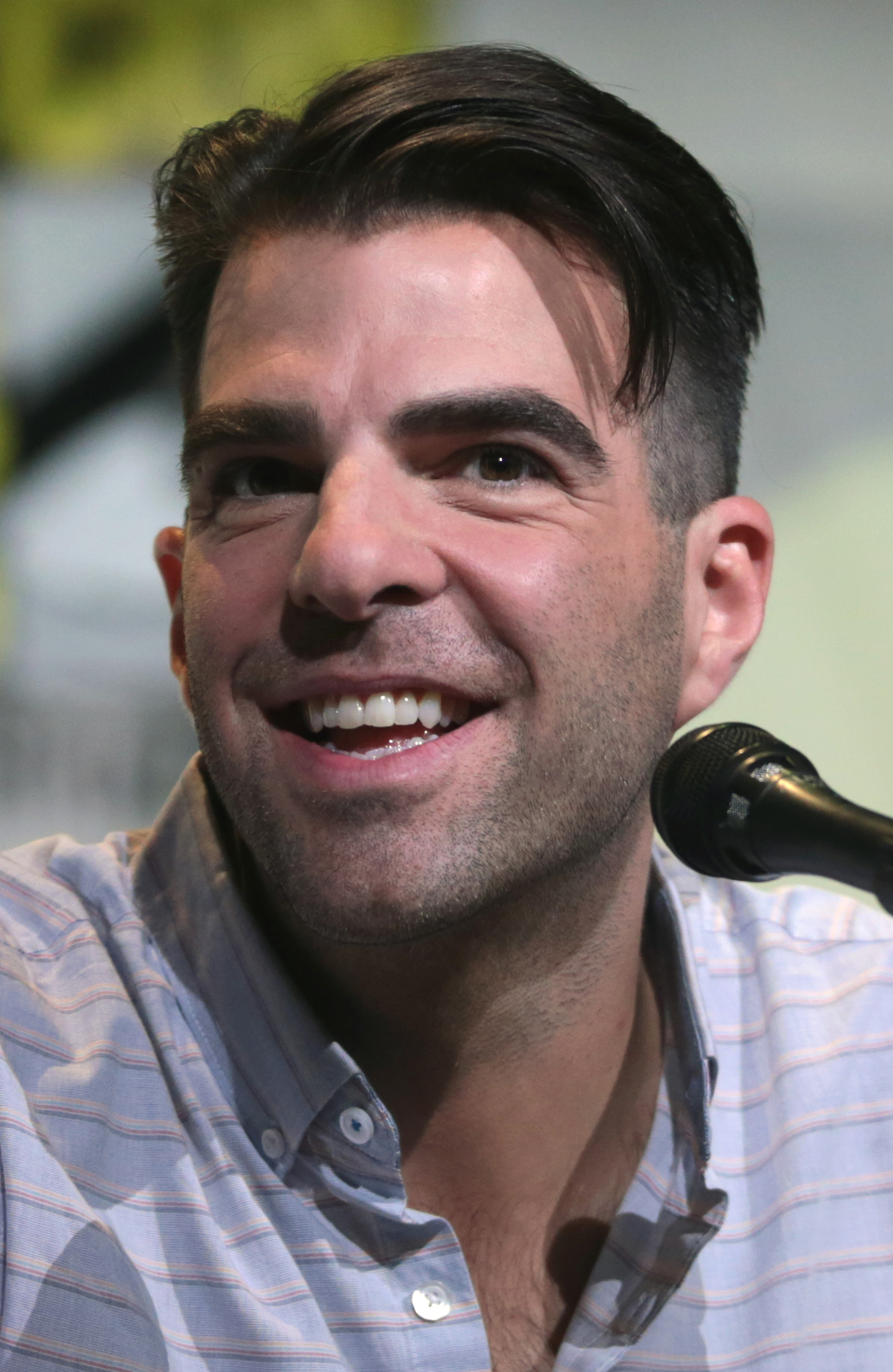
Zachary Quinto
- Dennis Quaid
- Zachary Quinto defines the word "flexible" with Grover

== R ==
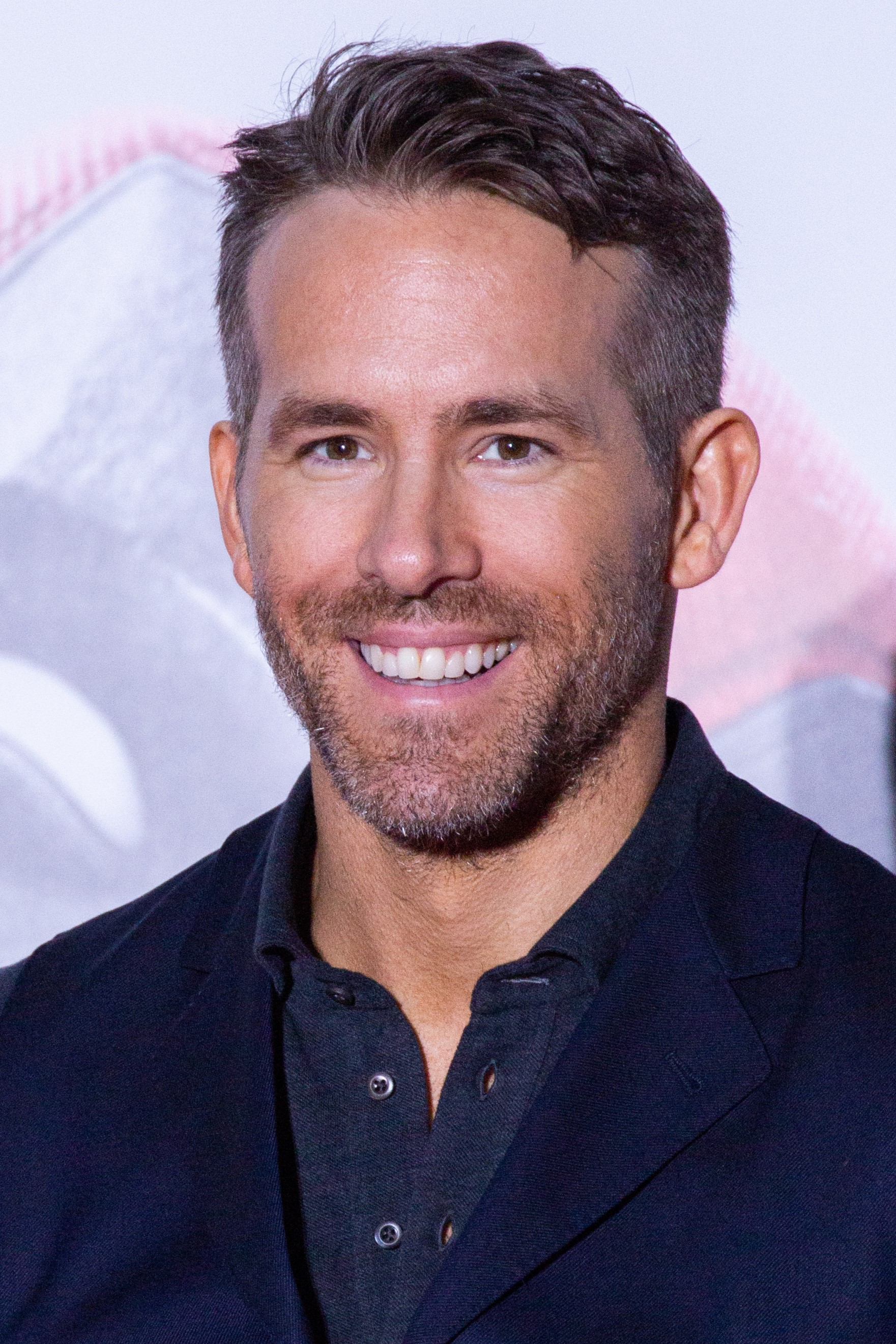
Ryan Reynolds

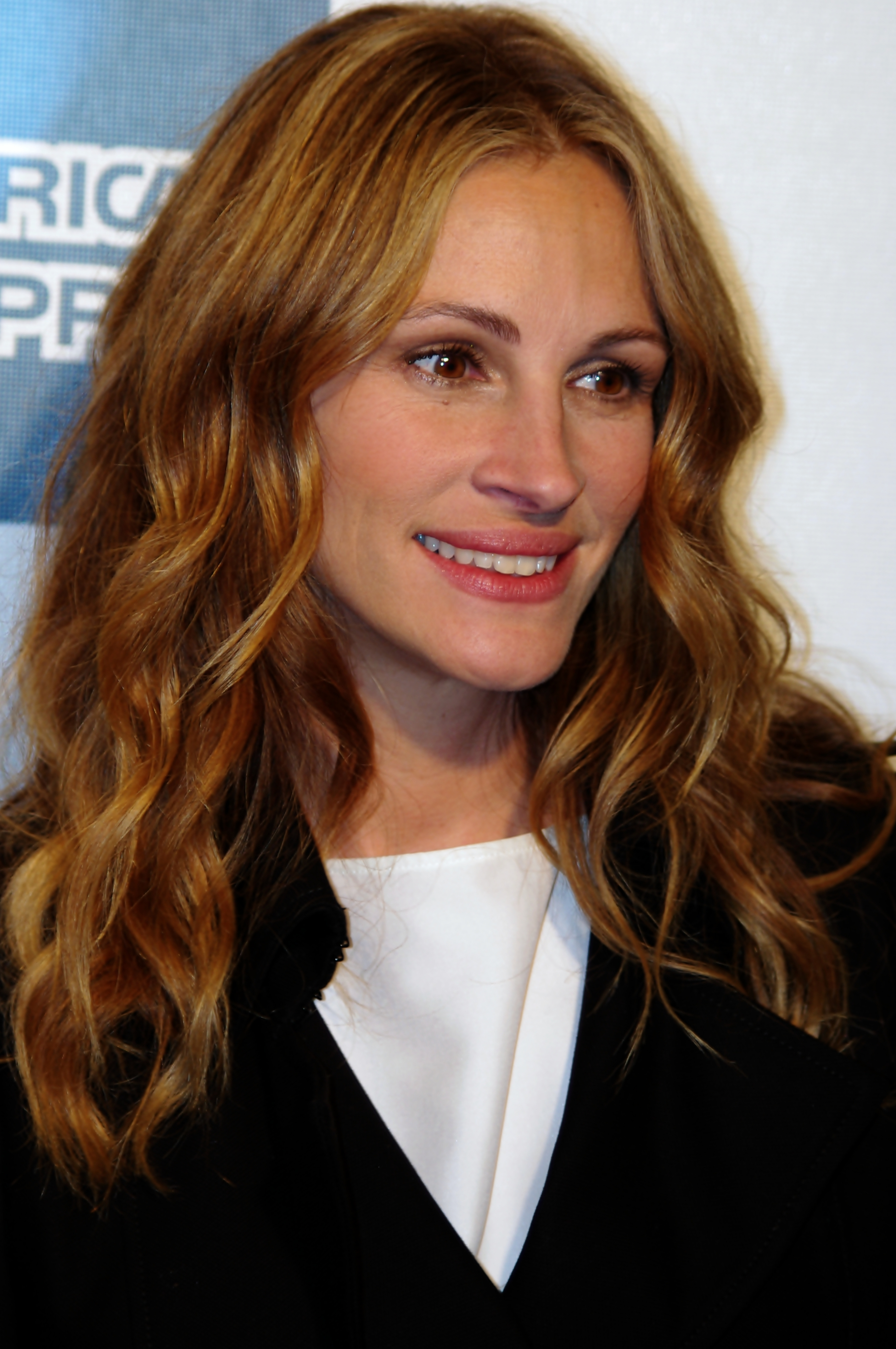
Julia Roberts

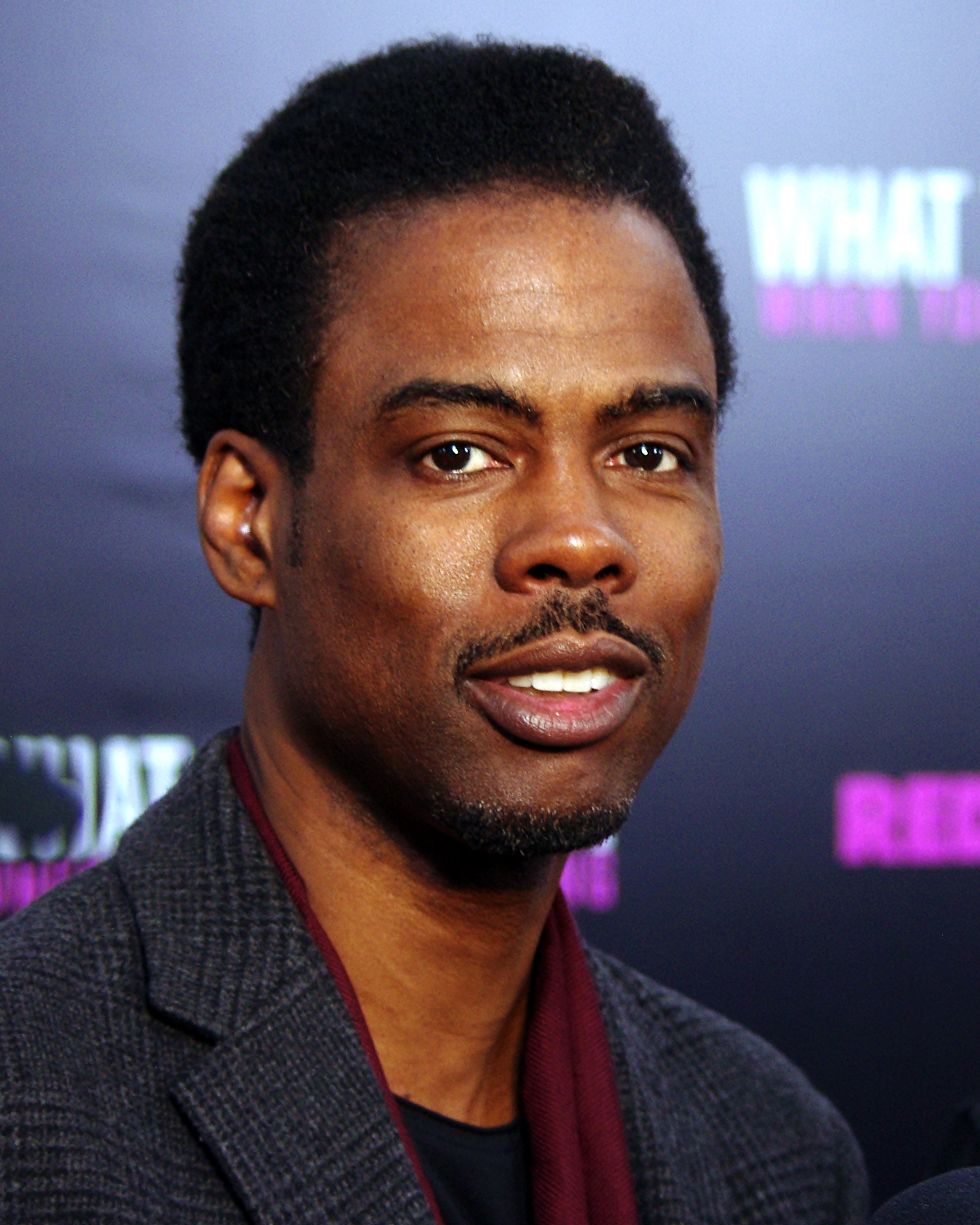
Chris Rock

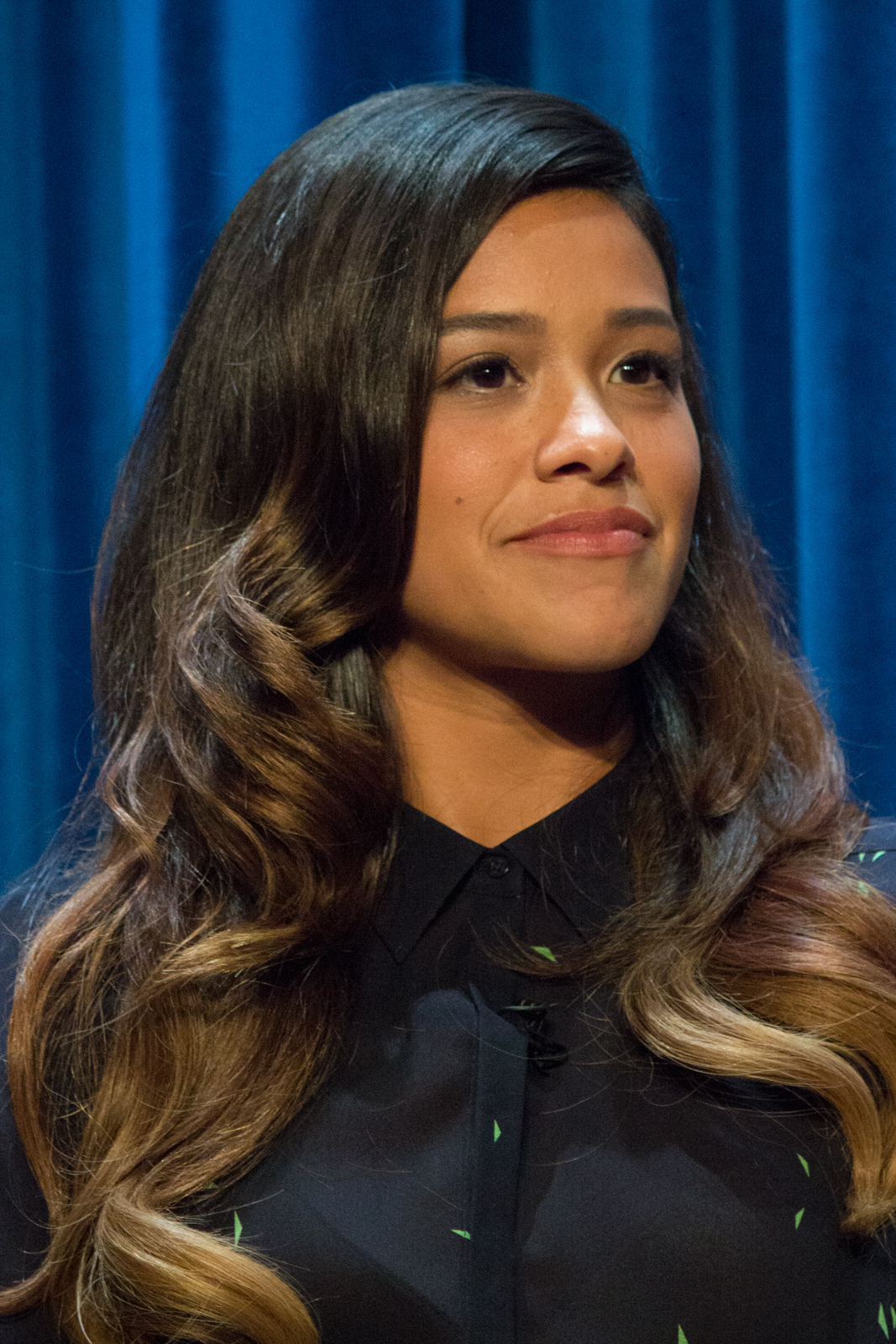
Gina Rodriguez

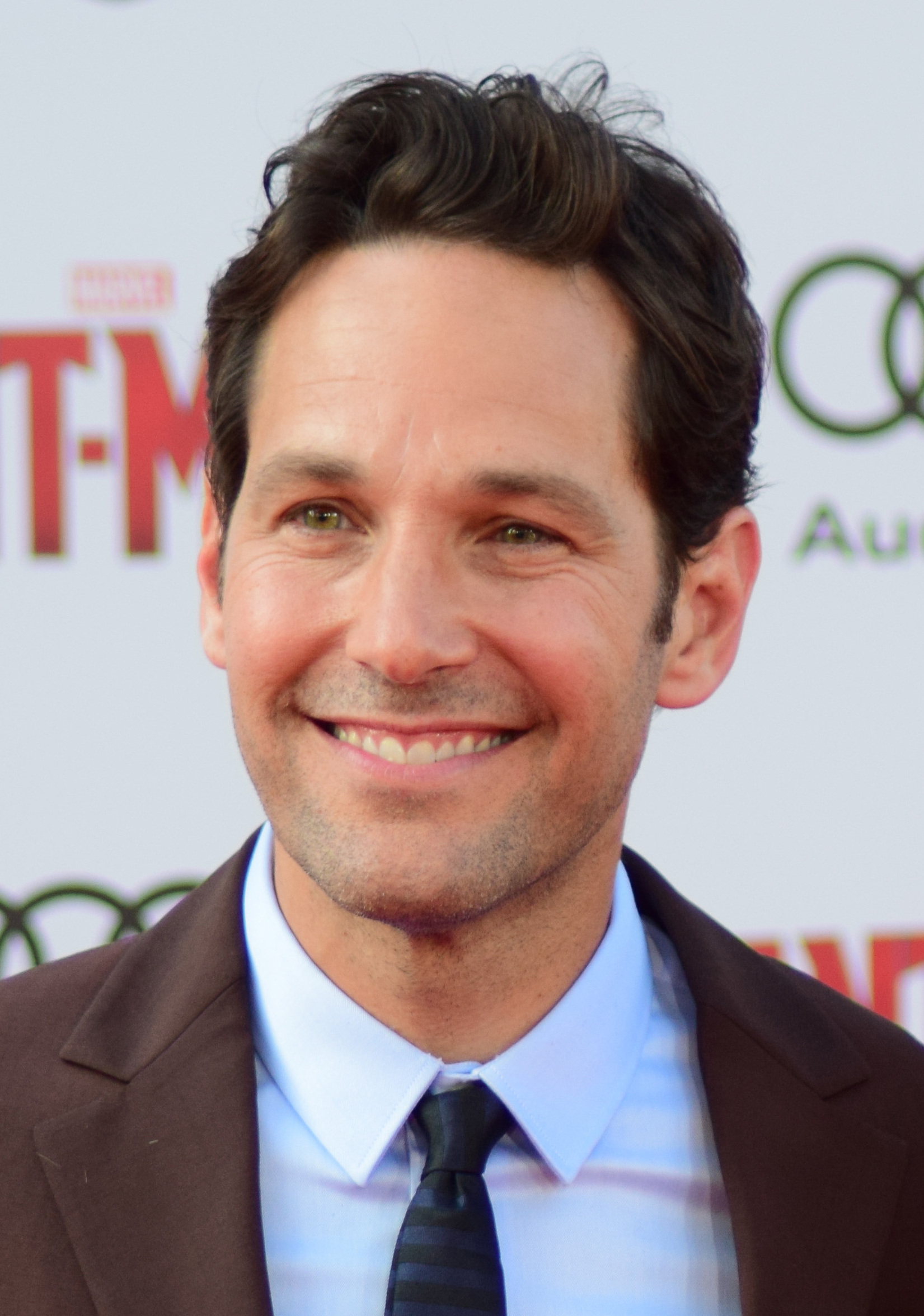
Paul Rudd

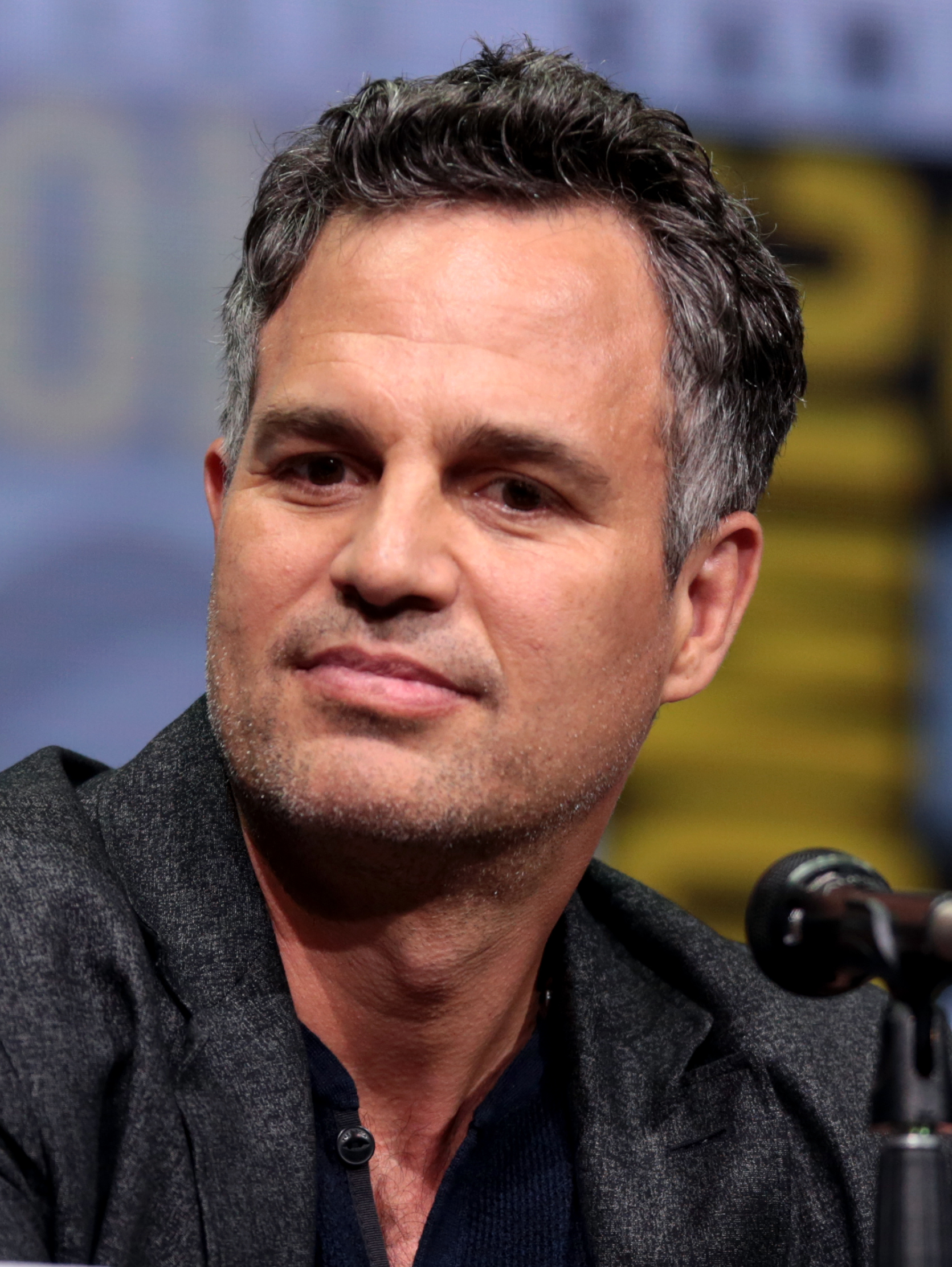
Mark Ruffalo
- R2-D2
- R.E.M. sing the song "Furry Happy Monsters"
- Sally Jessy Raphaël
- Reneé Rapp singing about feelings with Elmo, Cookie Monster, and Abby Cadabby
- Ahmad Rashad defines the word "gigantic" in episode 4152
- Lou Rawls (one segment): Rawls appeared in a segment during the first season, to sing the alphabet. He dismissed the concept of using cue cards for the performance, but reversed such decision when he forgot the order of the letters.
- Rachael Ray (two segments): one baking pumpernickel bread and one describing the word 'amazing'
- Jeff Redd he sang Between.
- Helen Reddy
- Linda Redfearn
- Christopher Reeve (two segments): Reeve first appeared on the show in 2000 for two segments; in one Reeve says the alphabet with Ernie and Ernie's Rubber Duckie, the other he demonstrates the independent living skills he developed after acquiring a disability in 1995 (quadriplegia)
- Paul Reubens (two segments): Reubens, as Pee-wee Herman, recited his own version of the alphabet in a 1987 insert. Reubens was also recorded for the celebrity version of Put Down the Duckie.
- Anne Revere
- Malvina Reynolds season 4 cast member: A folksinger, songwriter, and political activist, then 73-year-old Reynolds appeared on the show performing songs "This House Is Your House".
- Ryan Reynolds as the letter A in "The A Team"
- Andy Richter (one special): While trying to deliver a tape in the Elmopalooza special, Big Bird runs through the set of Late Night with Conan O'Brien, where Conan is interviewing the Yip Yips; Richter is seen in the background very briefly.
- Sally Ride (one segment): In January 1984, the year immediately following her historic mission, Ride taped a segment on the series where she talks about how A is for astronaut, while Grundgetta visits
- Mike Riordan (basketball)|Mike Riordan for The New York Knicks
- Kelly Ripa unable to find the slip of paper on which she wrote the meaning of "frustrated" in episode 4144 and played by Mail Carrier Kelly
- Tim Robbins (two segments and one street scene): Robbins appeared in two 1990 insert segments. In the first, he performs at Prairie Dawn's pageant about the seasons; Robbin's then 5-year-old daughter Eva appeared at the end of the segment. The second, first aired episode 3960, he talks about surprises with Elmo. In a 1997 street scene, Robbins rents a room at the Furry Arms Hotel, which he shares with Muppet animals. Talking to Sesame Street Magazine in 1997, Robbins listed three reasons for appearing on the show: his children, Eva, Jack Henry, and Miles. Robbin's then five-year-old son Miles taped three segments with Baby Bear that appeared throughout the 29th season.
- Doris Roberts (two appearances in one special): In the introduction to Sesame Street special The Street We Live On, Roberts is one of the celebrities in the "My Favorite Sesame Street Moments" clip. She later appeared in a celebrity montage of the song "Dance Myself to Sleep".
- Julia Roberts Elmo demonstrates to her how to look scared
- Robin
- Craig Robinson defines the word "pattern" with Elmo
- Jackie Robinson recites the alphabet in season 1
- Smokey Robinson sings "You Really Got a Hold on Me" for the letter "U"
- Chris Rock
- Adam Rodriguez as Detective (Alphie) Betts, helps Elmo and Abby find the missing R objects stolen by the Letter R
- Gina Rodriguez
- Ken "Blenda" Rodriguez for the Harlem Globetrotters
- Rico Rodriguez defines the word "magnify" with Elmo
- Seth Rogen defines "embarrassed" with Elmo
- Fred Rogers
- Maggie Rogers sang "It's Nighttime"
- Al Roker defines the word "family"
- Ray Romano
- Rebecca Romijn defines "accessories" with Abby Cadabby
- Linda Ronstadt
- Tracee Ellis Ross
- Diana Ross sings the song "If You Believe" with Big Bird in 1979
- Emmy Rossum defines the word "focus" with Abby Cadabby
- Mike Rowe appeared with Oscar the Grouch in a segment parody of Dirty Jobs called "Dirtiest Jobs"
- Paul Rudd discusses "brilliant" with Grover
- Maya Rudolph demonstrates "brainstorm" with Elmo
- Mark Ruffalo defines "empathy" with Murray
- Amber Ruffin
- Amy Ryan defines the word "paleontologist" with Elmo
- Meg Ryan with Elmo and Julia

== S ==
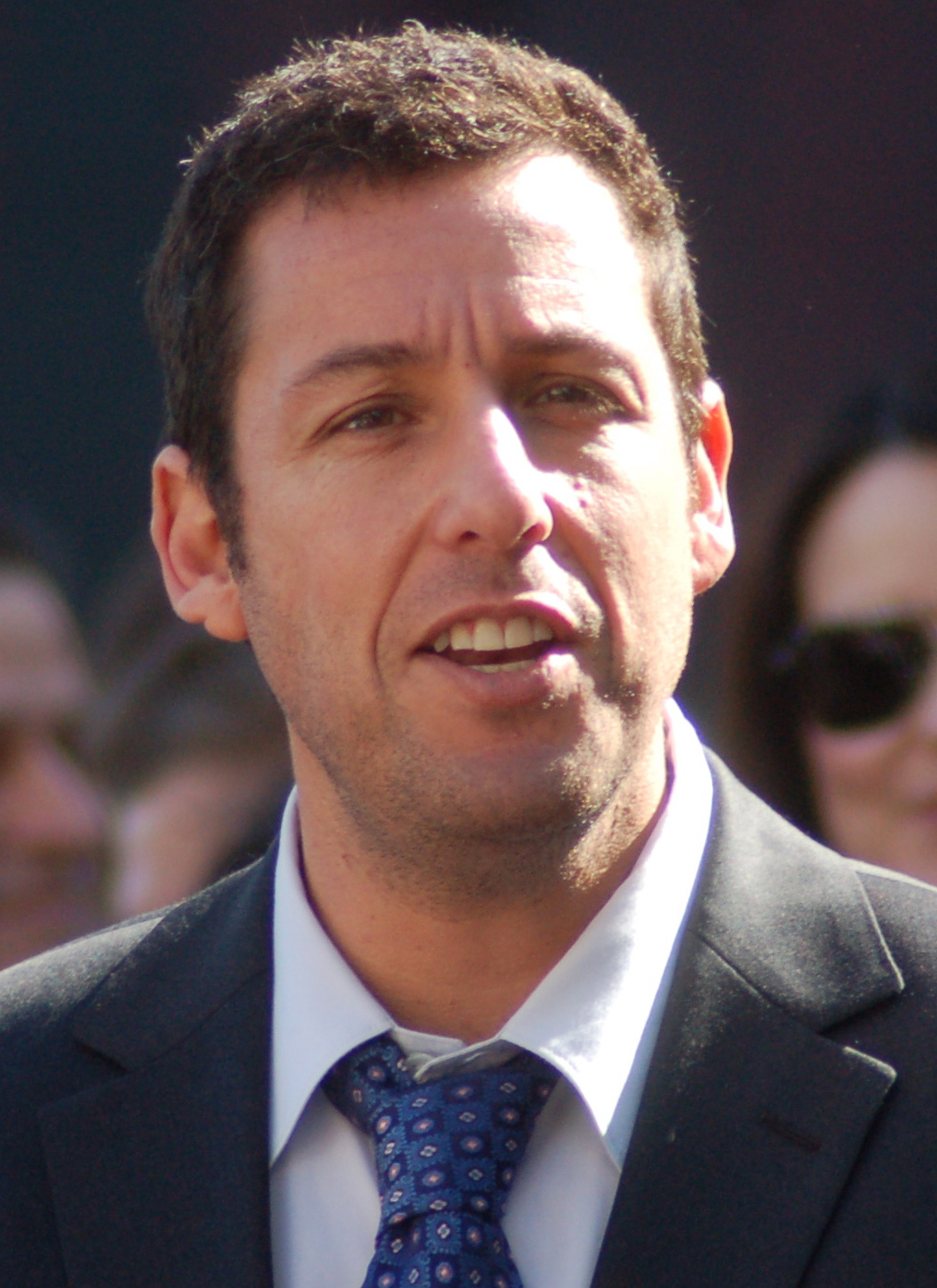
Adam Sandler

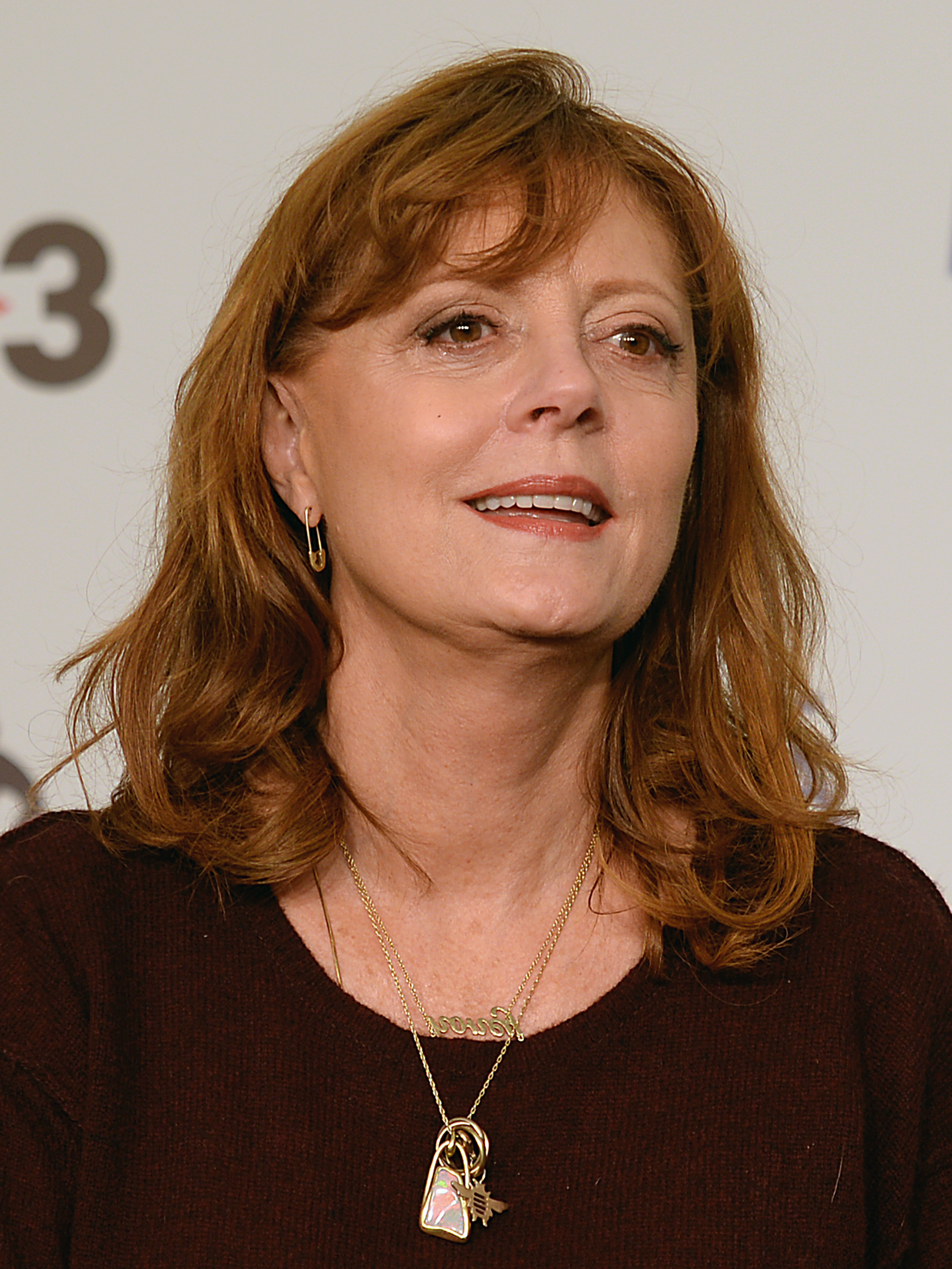
Susan Sarandon

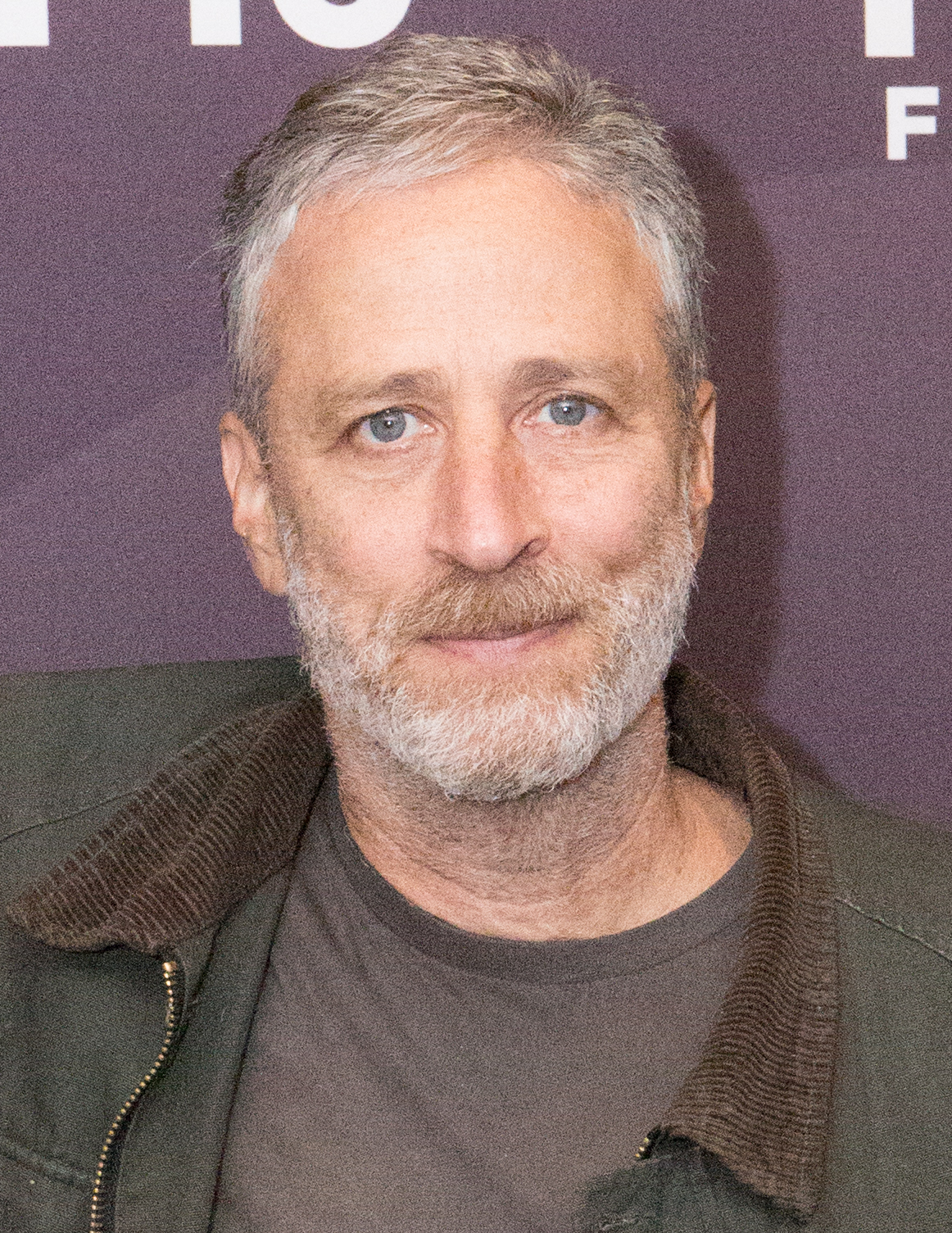
Jon Stewart

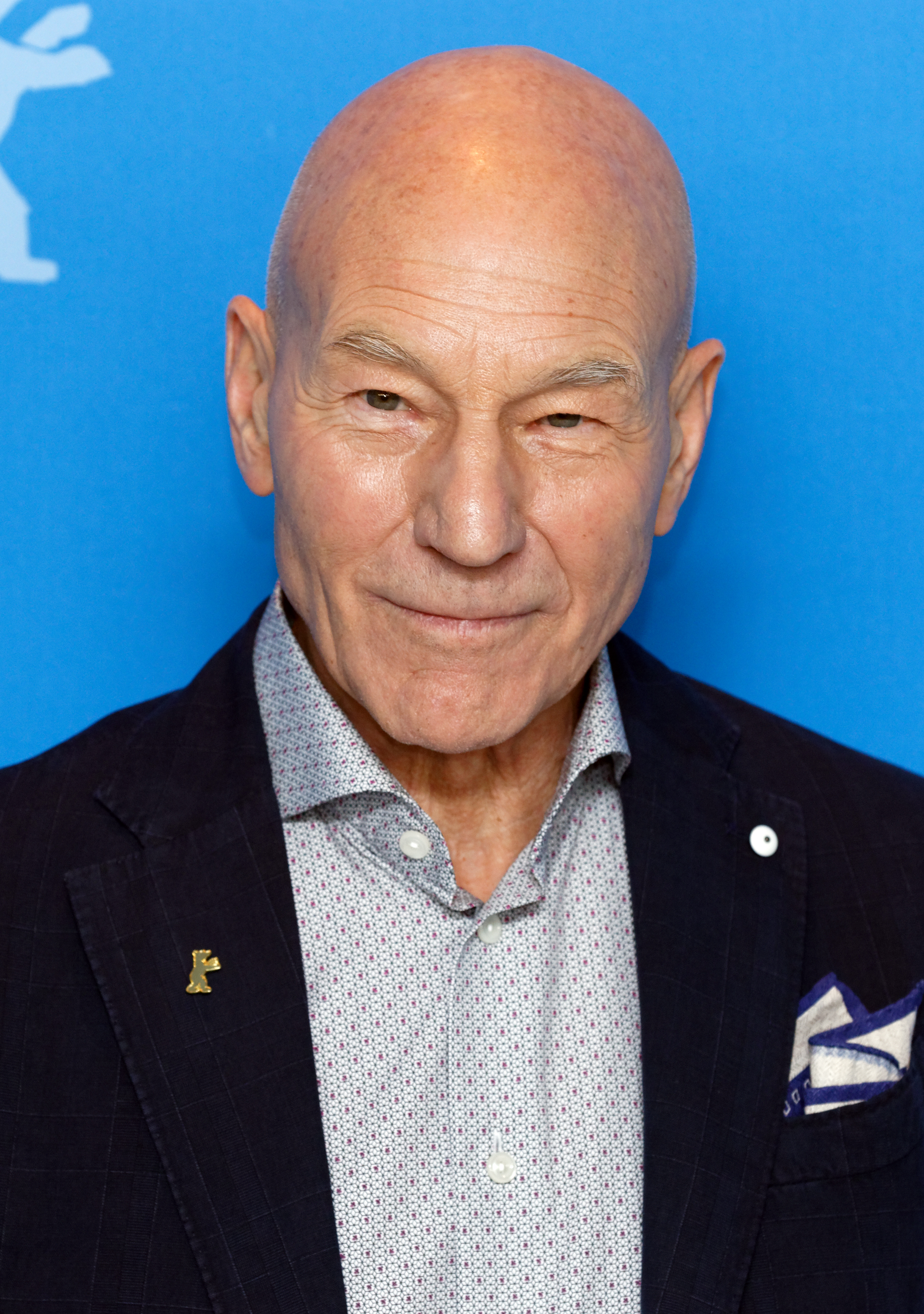
Patrick Stewart

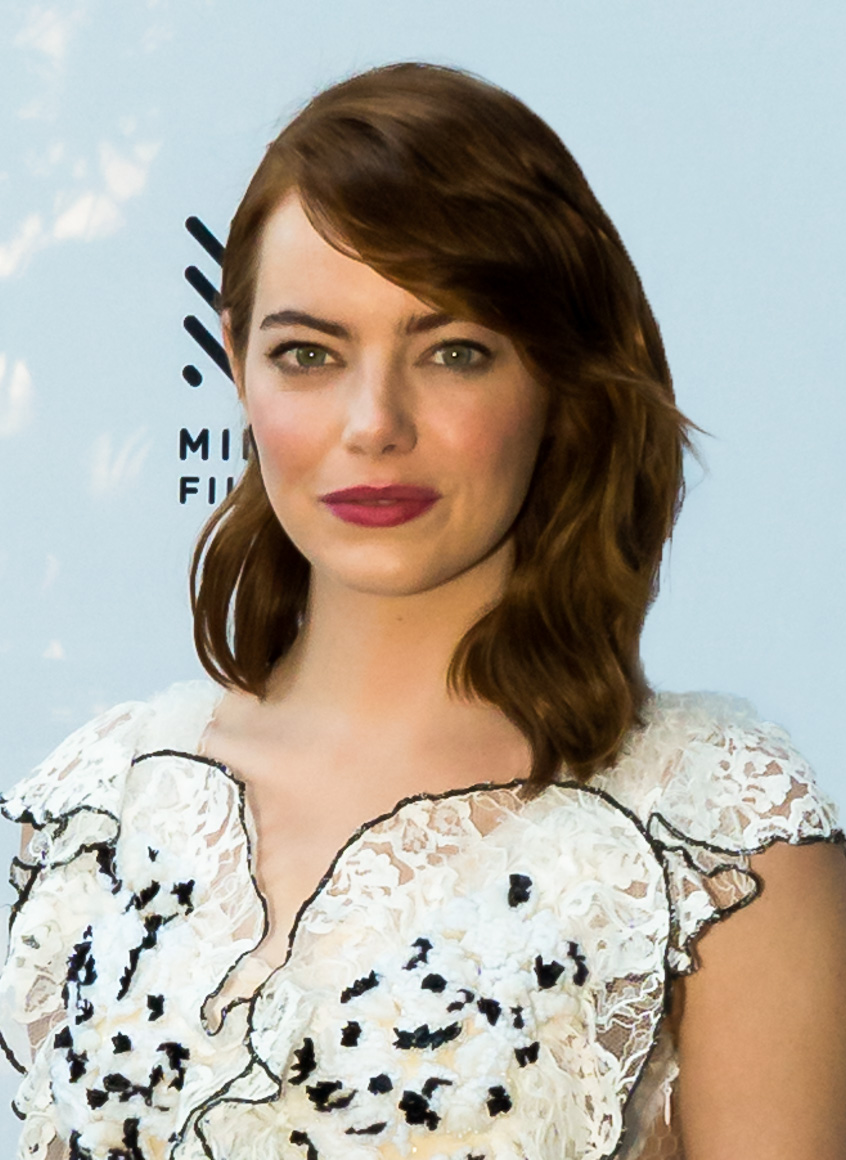
Emma Stone

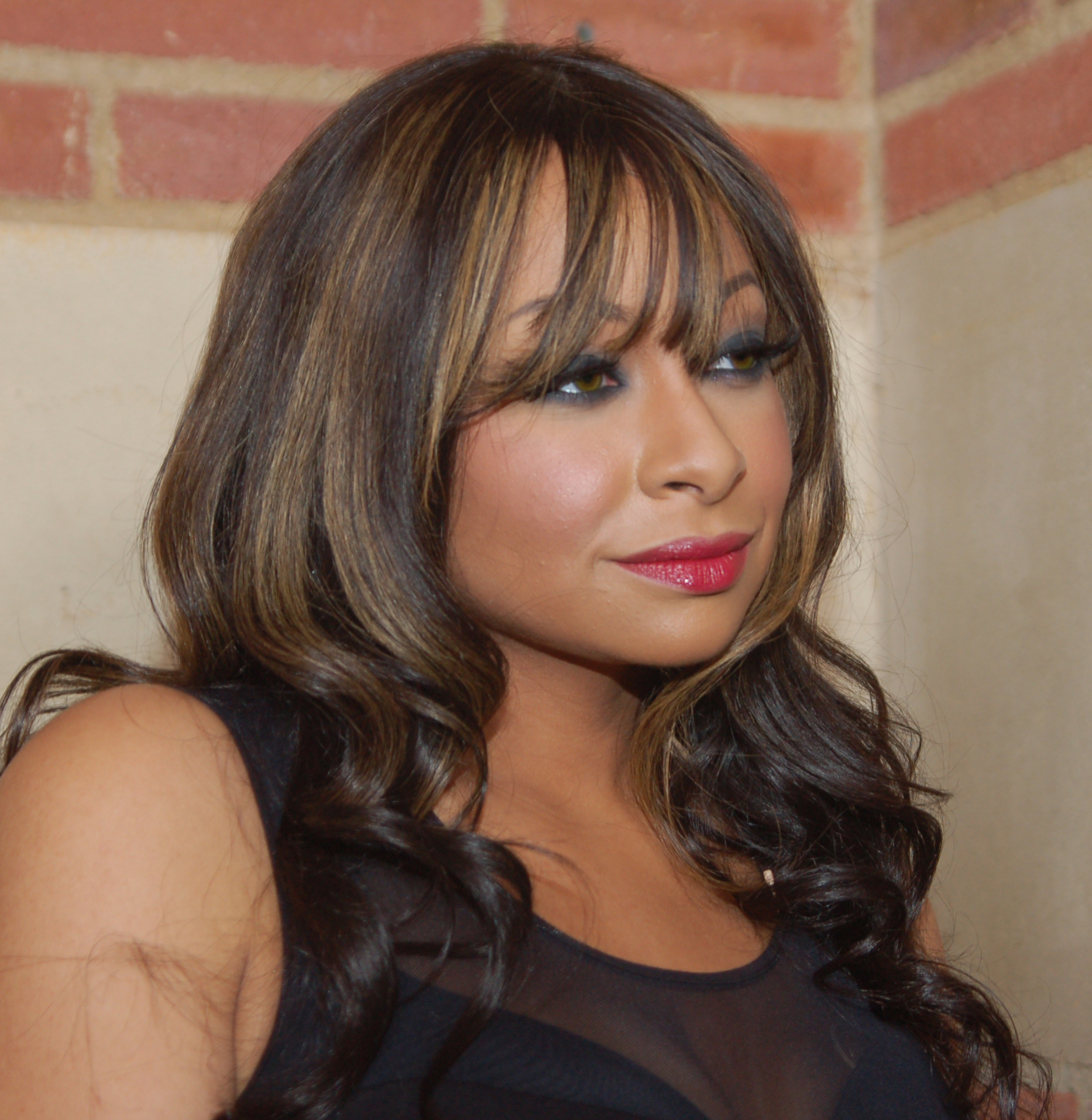
Raven-Symoné
- Buffy Sainte-Marie (a regular on the show from 1975 to 1981)
- Zoe Saldaña defined "transportation" with Elmo
- Tony Saletan
- Lea Salonga
- Andy Samberg
- Adam Sandler sings "a song about Elmo" and meets up with Cookie Monster to talk about the word "crunchy"
- Romeo Santos
- Susan Sarandon sings alphabet song
- Adam Savage provided the voice of Heathcliff in his father's "He, She, and It" animated segments
- Diane Sawyer
- Liev Schreiber explains "exchange" with Elmo and his then-wife Naomi Watts and also appeared in "Elmo's Got the Moves"
- Diane Schuur
- Adam Scott defines "awful" with Murray
- Jay Sean
- Amy Sedaris
- Kyra Sedgwick
- Pete Seeger
- Amanda Seyfried Natalie Neptune
- Molly Shannon
- Ed Sheeran sings the song "Two Different Worlds"
- Dax Shepard demonstrates "amplify" with Abby Cadabby
- Sherri Shepherd defined "identical"
- David Shiner
- Martin Short (appeared in character as Ed Grimley)
- Paul Simon sings "Me and Julio Down by the Schoolyard"
- Nina Simone
- The Simpsons
- Sinbad
- Madge Sinclair
- Gene Siskel
- Jeff Smith
- Yeardley Smith (as Lisa Simpson)
- Cobie Smulders discusses "courteous" with Grover
- Brittany Snow defines the word "friend" with Elmo
- Sonia Sotomayor defines "career" with Abby Cadabby
- Dale Soules
- Spin Doctors (one segment): sang the song "Cooperation" (Two Princes) with Elmo, Zoe, and Telly Monster
- Squirrel Nut Zippers
- Chris Stapleton
- Gwen Stefani
- Hailee Steinfeld sang "I Wonder, What If, Let's Try"
- Isaac Stern
- Jon Stewart defines "practice" in a taped segment
- Patrick Stewart sings alphabet song
- Ben Stiller sang "These are the People in Our Neighborhood" with Telly
- Michael Stipe
- Richard Stoltzman appeared on episode 2633. During the first street scene, He plays The Sesame Street theme song on the clarinet. Later on in the episode. He explains to Oscar that playing the clarinet with just the pieces will not make a good sound. When he built the pieces together, he can play. He plays Rhapsody in Blue.
- Emma Stone acts out the word "balance" with Abby Cadabby
- Eric Stonestreet demonstrates "remember" with Abby Cadabby
- Amar'e Stoudemire defines the word "compare" with Grover
- Picabo Street
- Ruben Studdard
- Harry Styles (sang "What Makes U Useful" with the letter U)
- Sugarland
- Nicole Sullivan
- Superman
- Wanda Sykes defines "journal" with Elmo
- Raven-Symoné teaches Big Bird how to dance
- SZA

== T ==
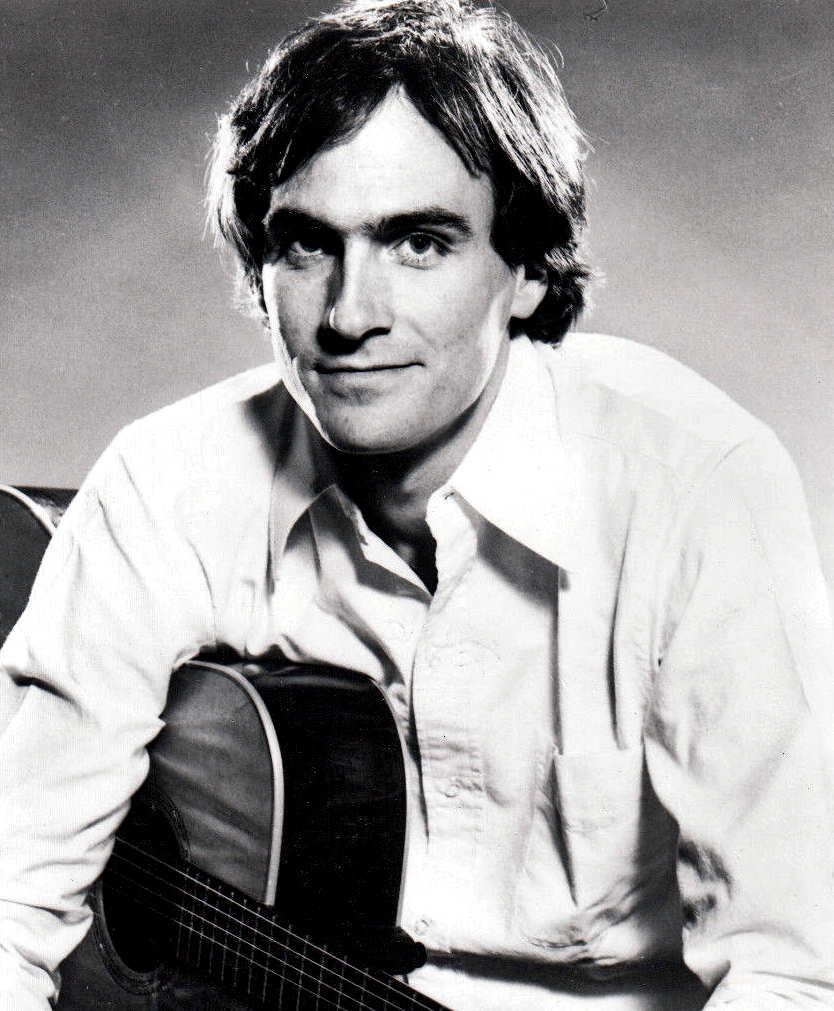
James Taylor

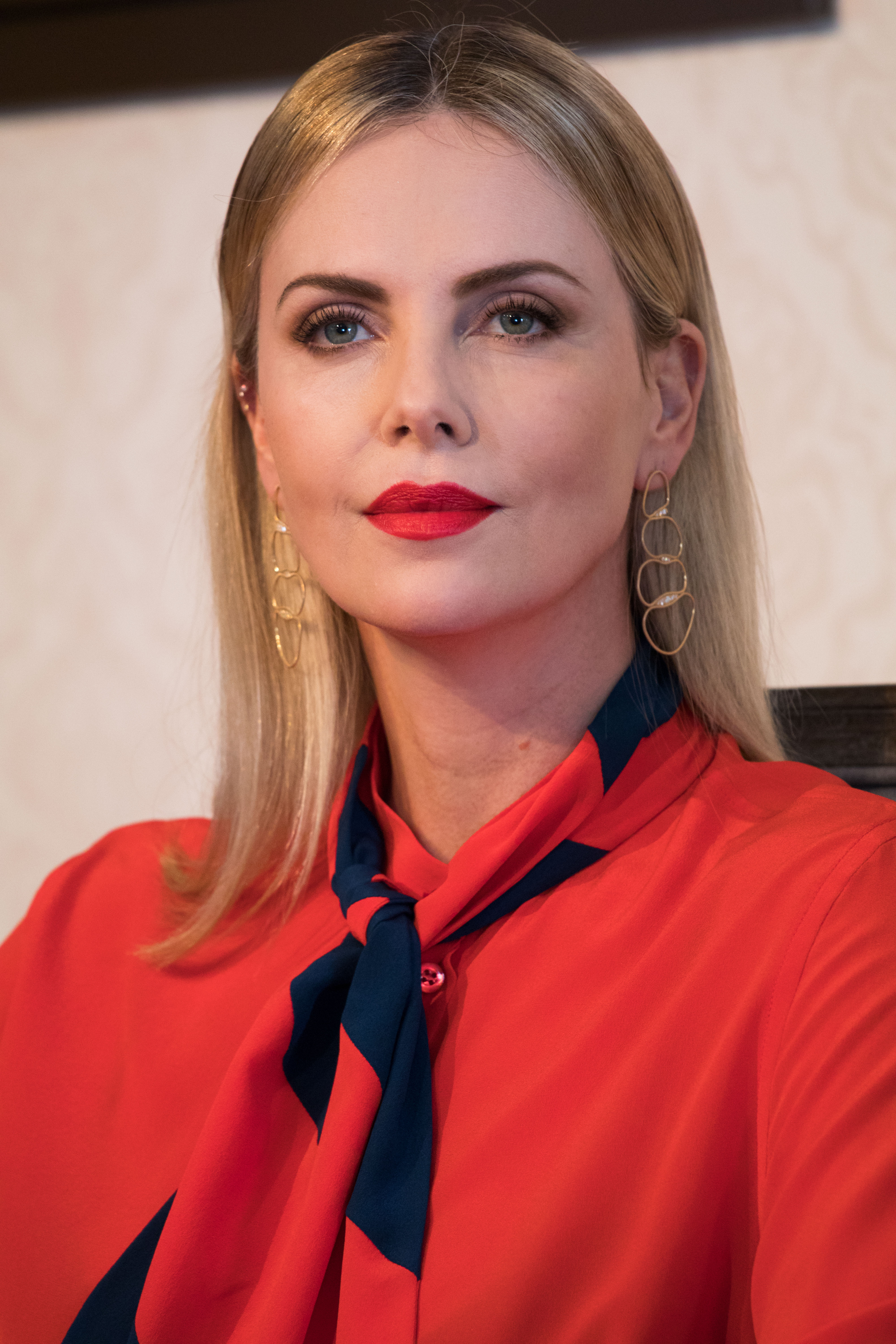
Charlize Theron

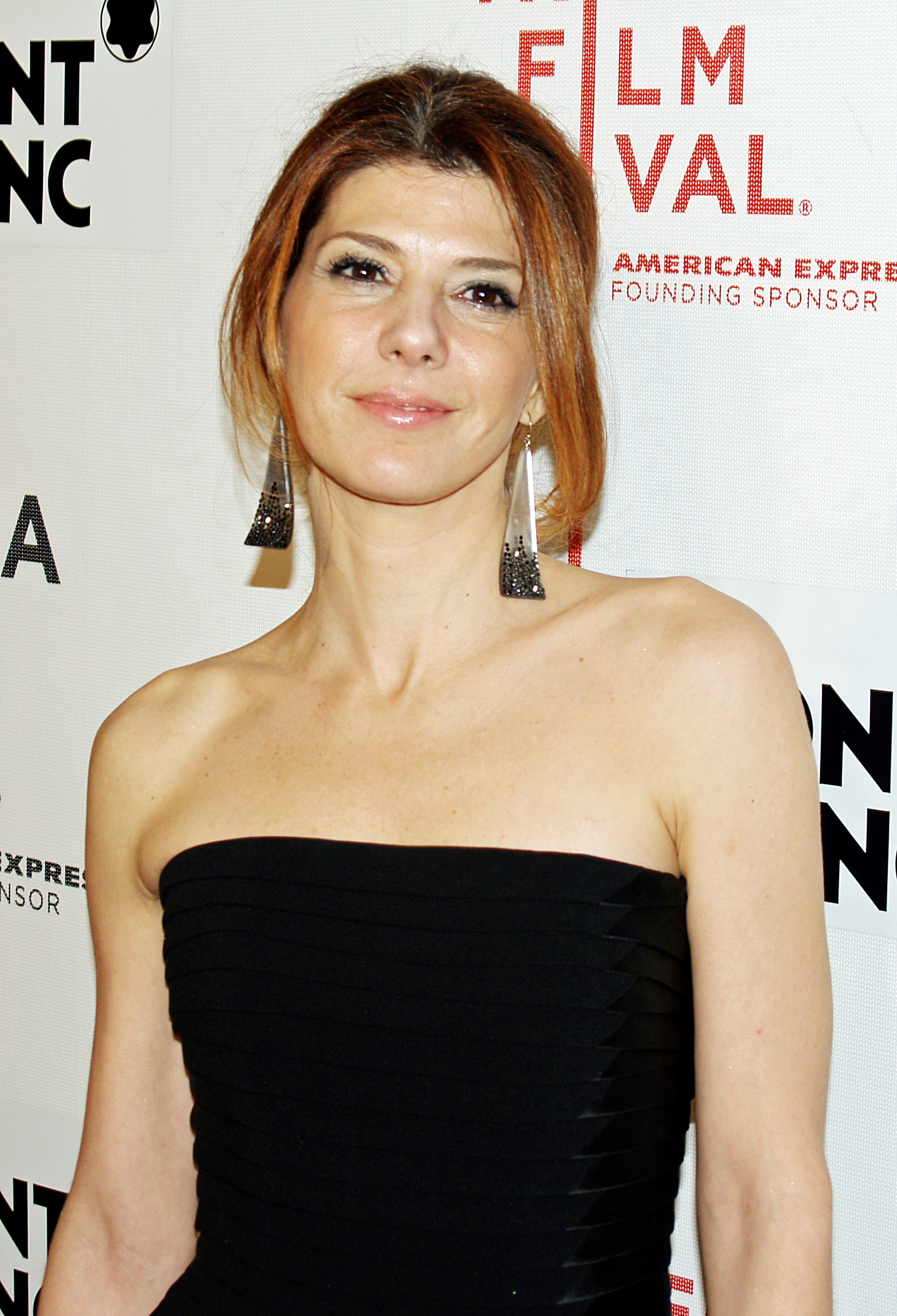
Marisa Tomei

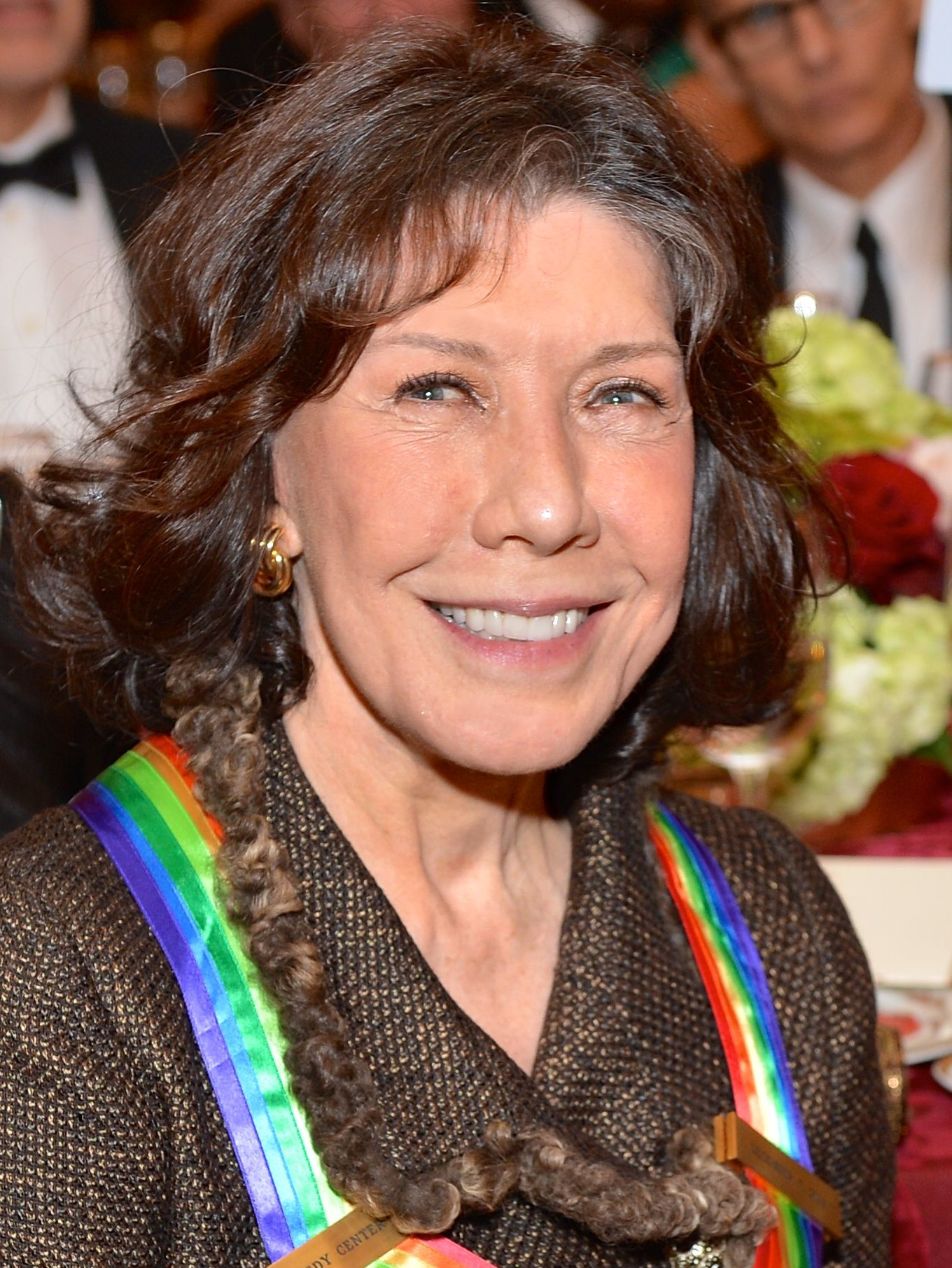
Lily Tomlin

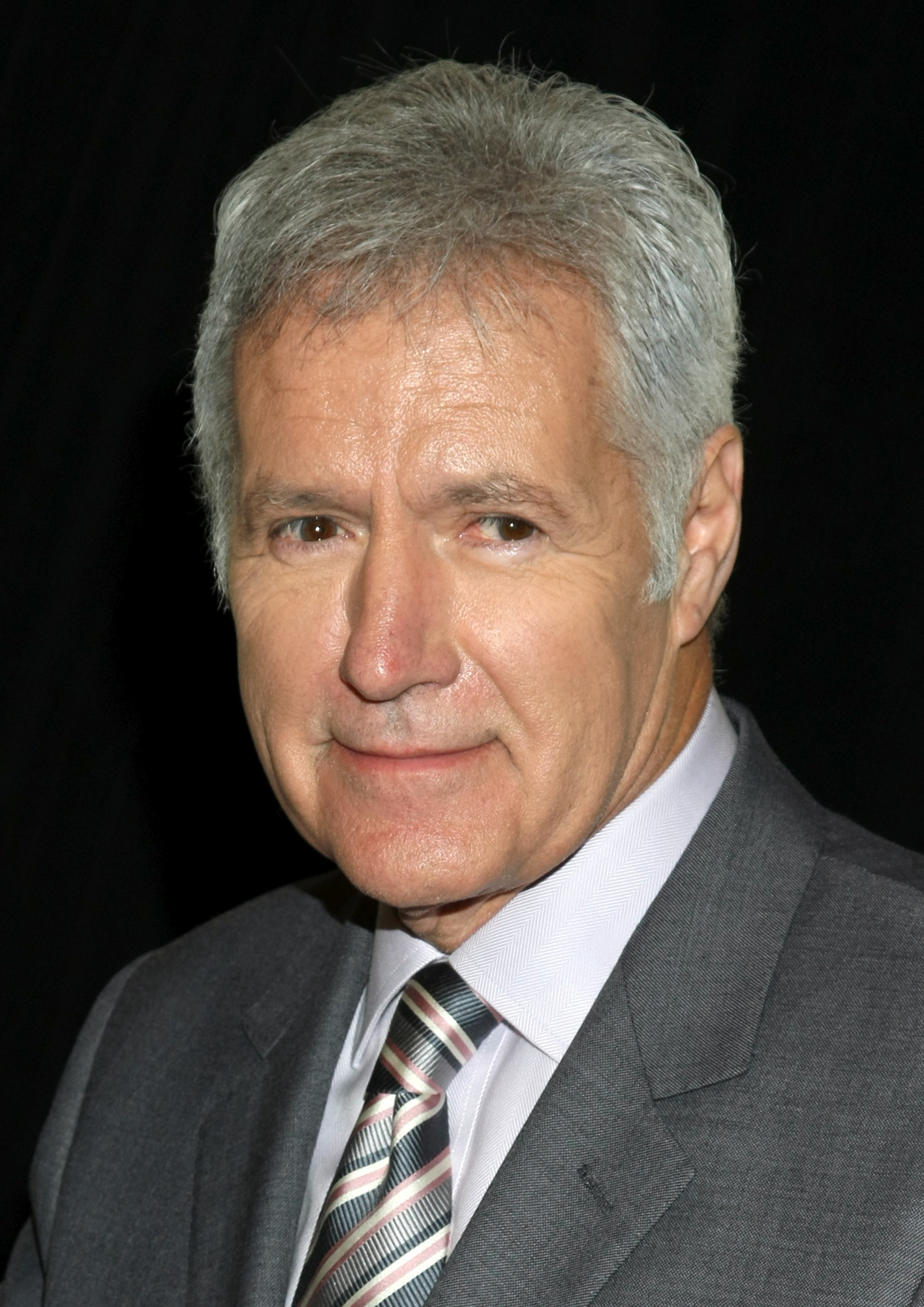
Alex Trebek
- Take 6
- James Taylor (sang "Jellyman Kelly" in season 14)
- Jason Taylor defining "toss" with Elmo
- Charlize Theron defines "jealous" with Abby Cadabby
- Lynne Thigpen (appeared in season 29 as the WASA Training instructor)
- Isiah Thomas
- Tilly and the Wall
- The Tokyo String Quartet
- Marisa Tomei
- Lily Tomlin
- LaDainian Tomlinson defines the word "celebration" with Elmo
- Louis Tomlinson (sang "What Makes U Useful" with the letter U)
- Joe Torre
- viewer in a my favorite Sesame Street Moment clip
- Robert Townsend
- Train sings "Five By"
- Randy Travis (sang "You Gotta Ask Some Questions" in season 22)
- Alex Trebek
- Travis Tritt
- Kathleen Turner

== U ==
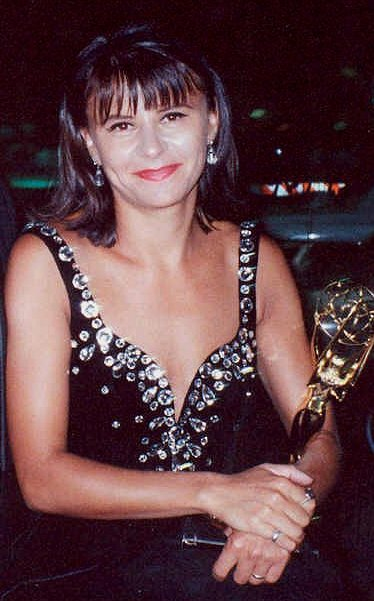
Tracey Ullman

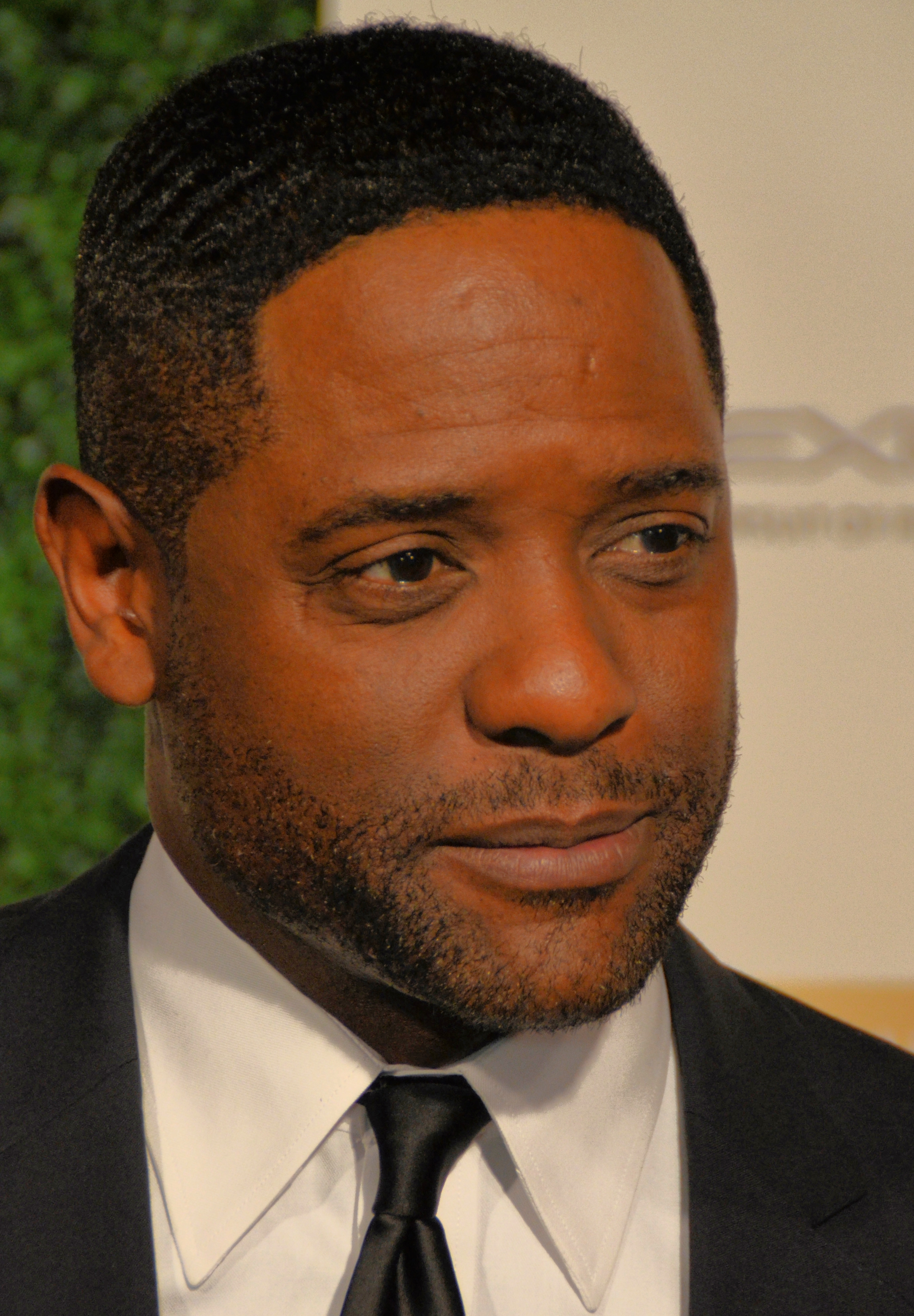
Blair Underwood

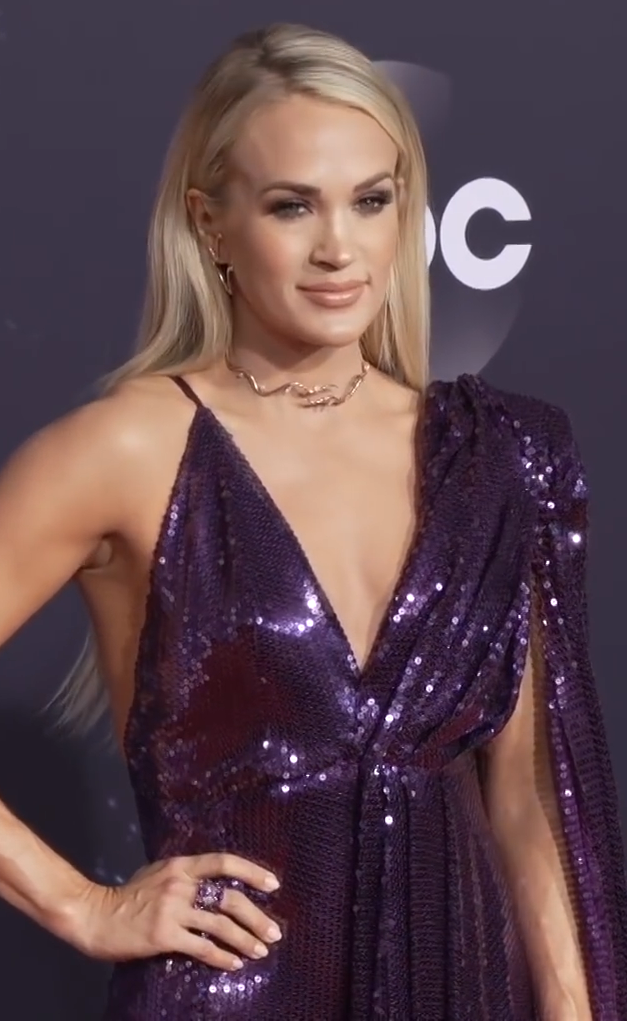
Carrie Underwood

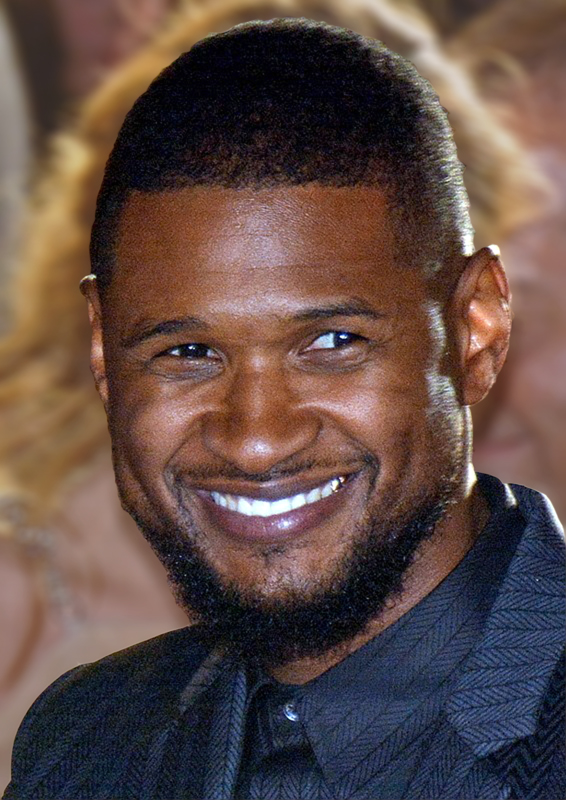
Usher
- Tracey Ullman (appeared as herself in season 20)
- Blair Underwood
- Carrie Underwood as "Carrie Underworm" performing "The Worm Anthem"
- Usher defined "volunteer" with Elmo, he also sang "The ABCs of Moving You" with various Muppets (over 115 million YouTube views), defined "unique" with Bert

== V ==
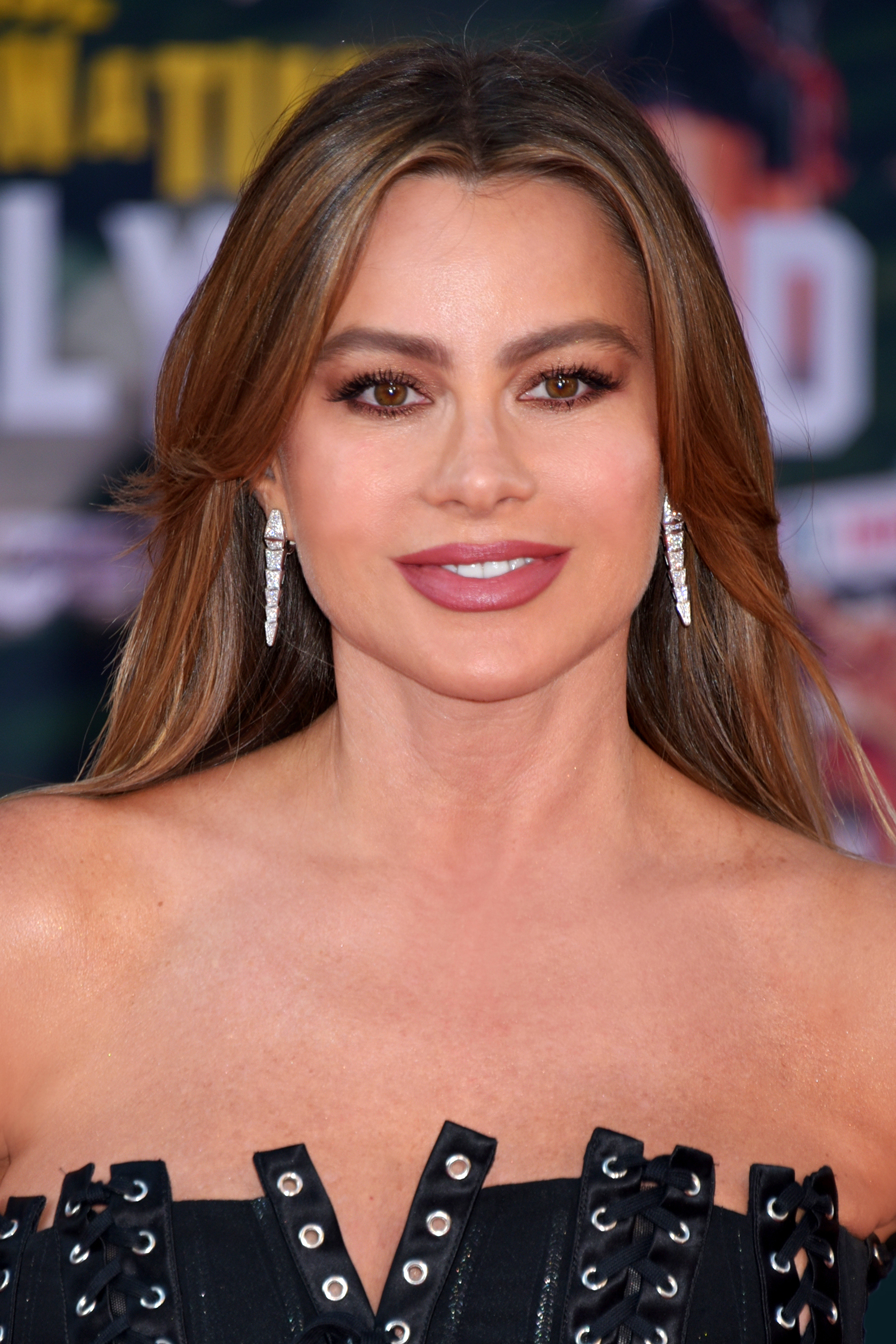
Sofía Vergara

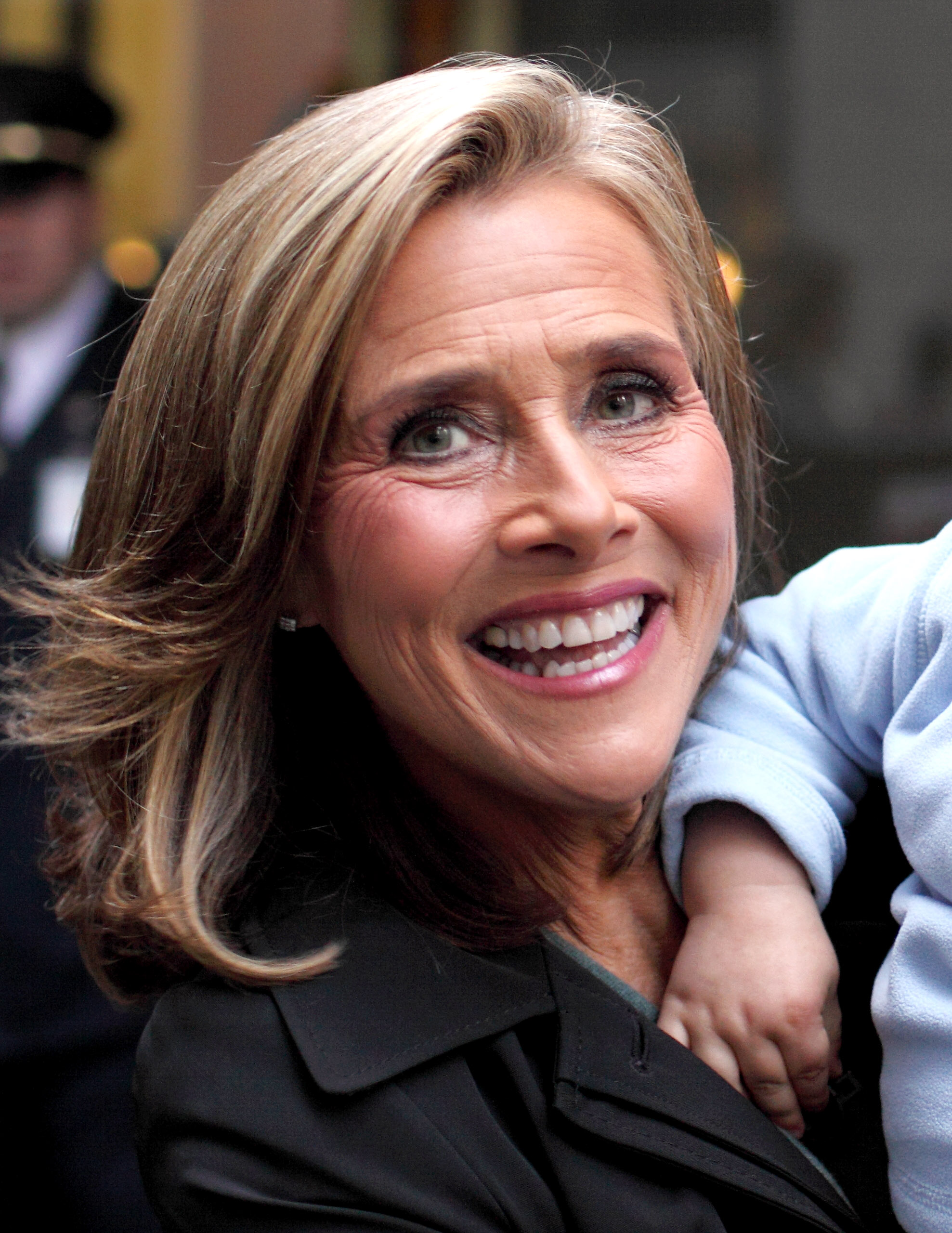
Meredith Vieira
- Luther Vandross
- Sofía Vergara demonstrates "baile" with Elmo
- Meredith Vieira defined the word "hibernate"
- David Villa in the 2016 webseries Love 2 Learn

== W ==
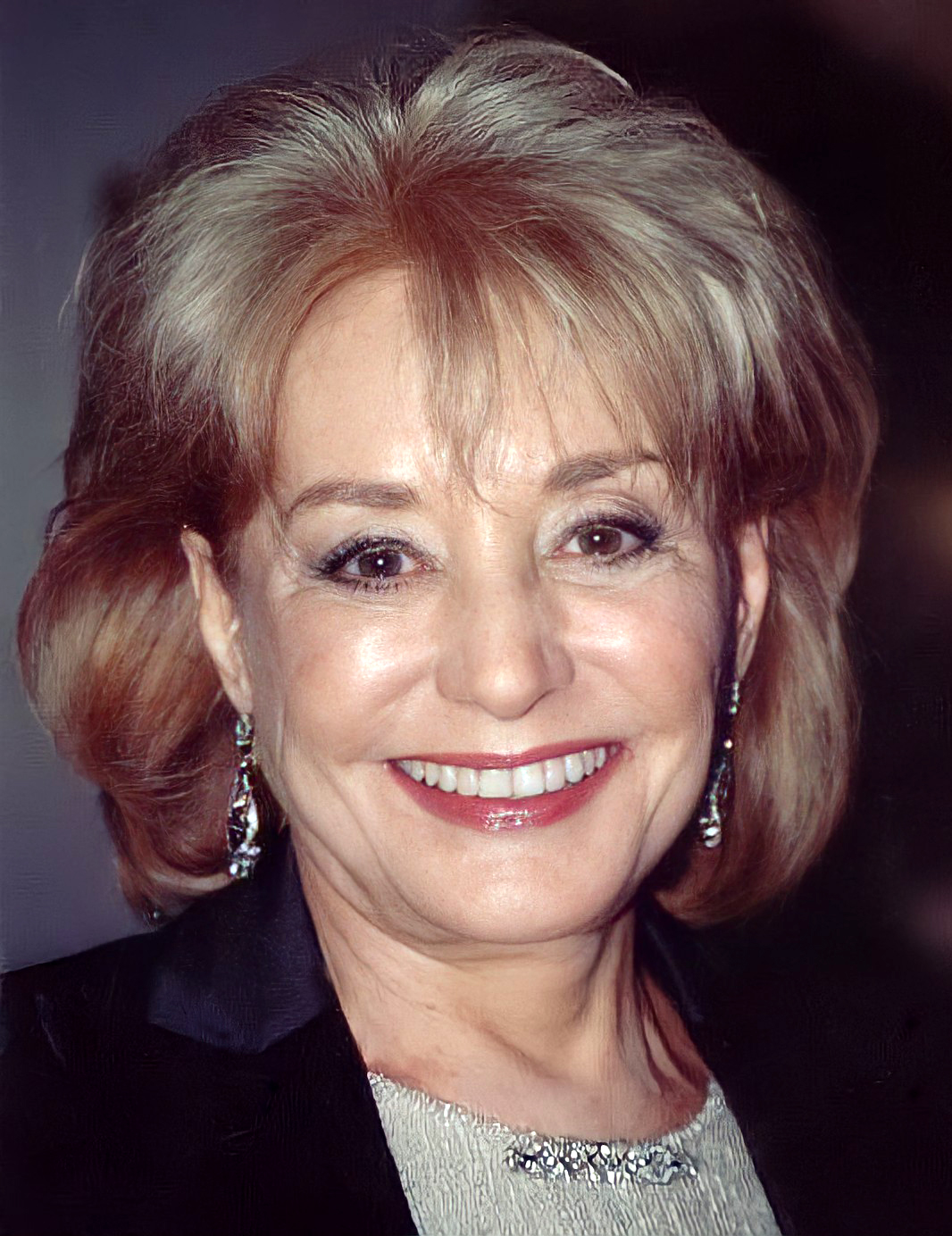
Barbara Walters

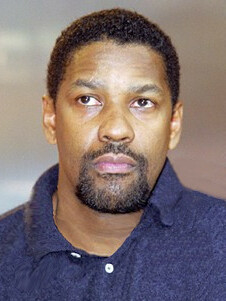
Denzel Washington

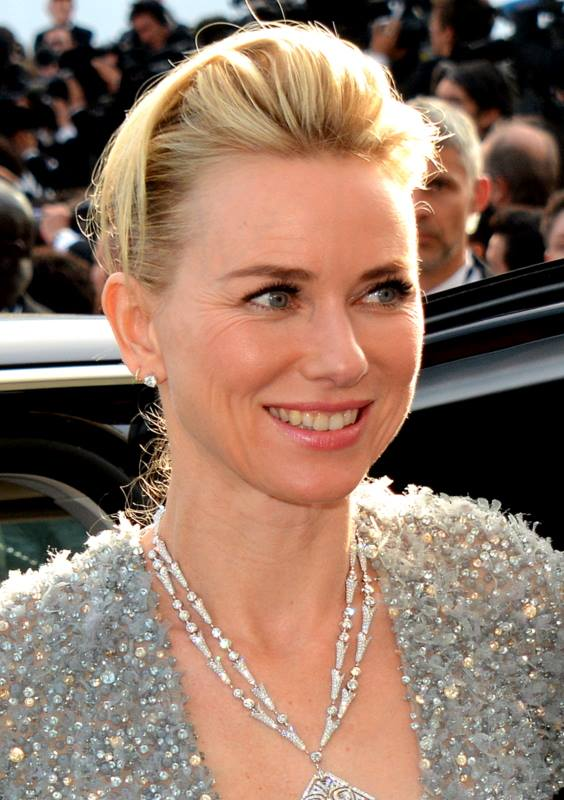
Naomi Watts

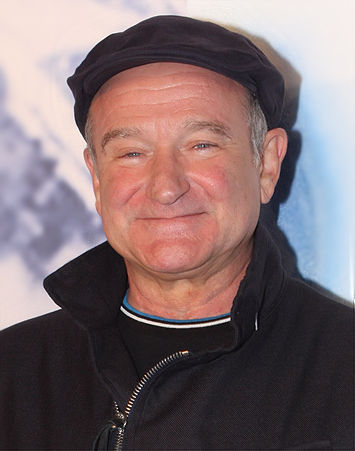
Robin Williams

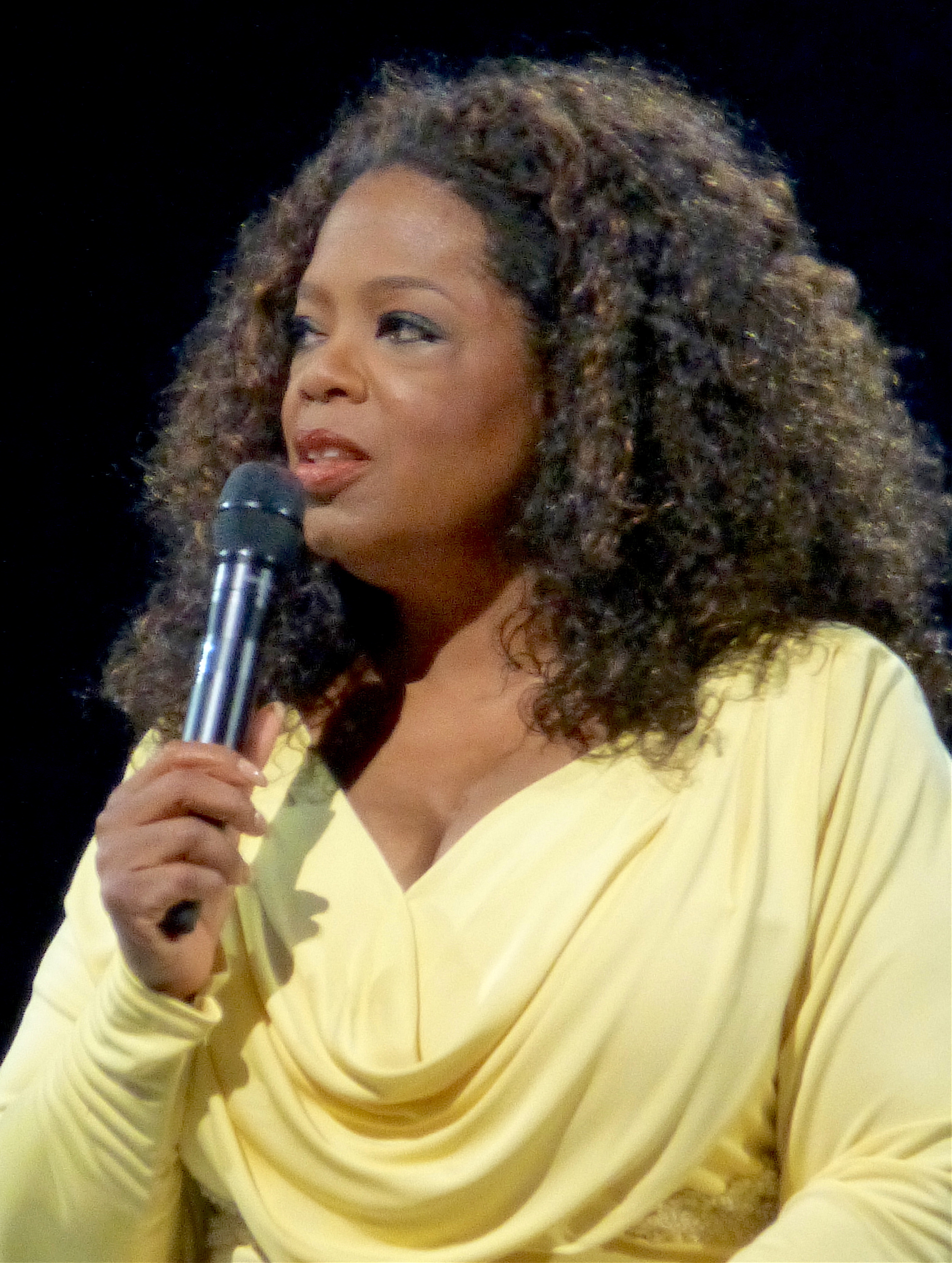
Oprah Winfrey

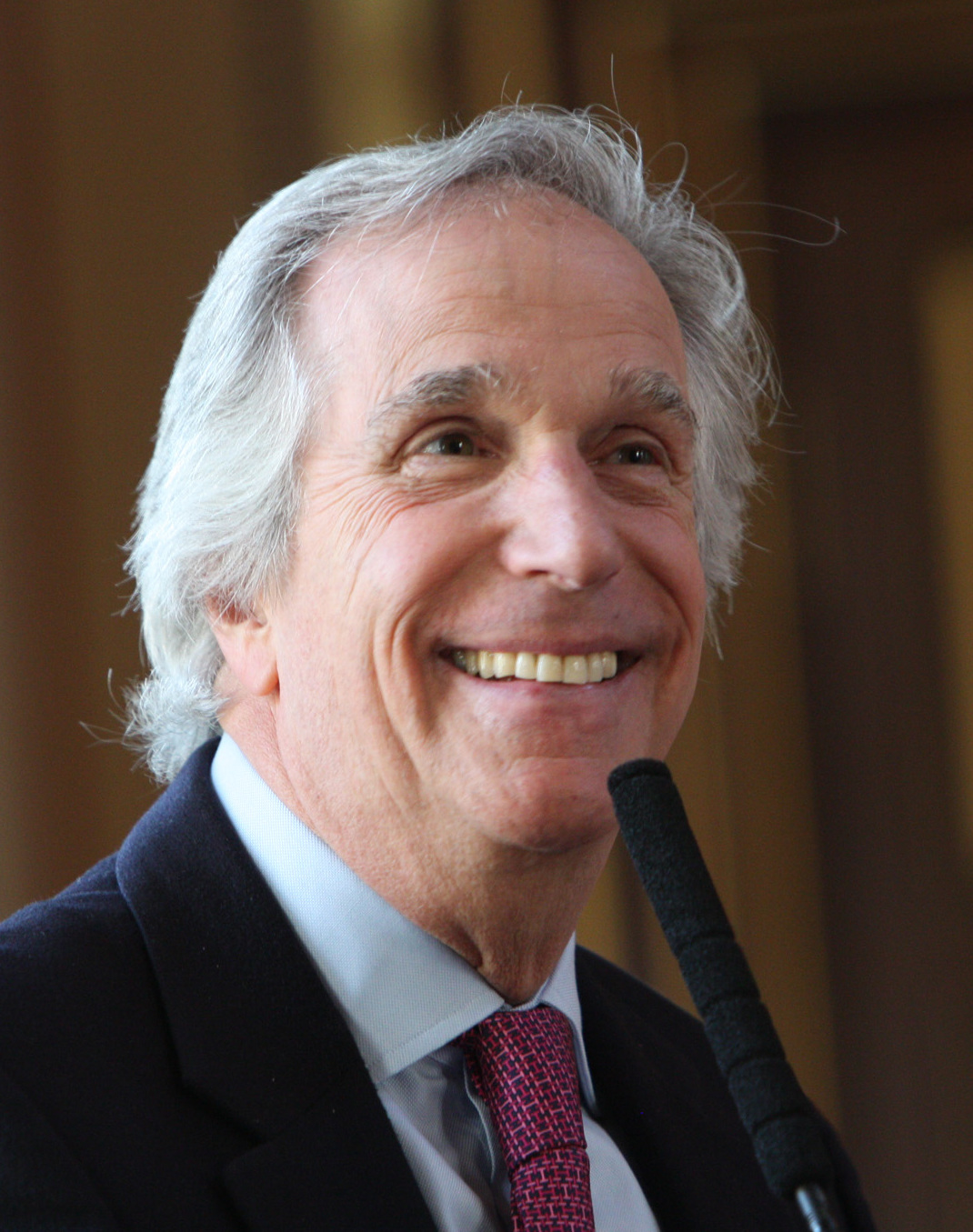
Henry Winkler
- Bubba Wallace (Episode 5601)
- Alice Walker
- Bill Walsh
- Barbara Walters
- Patrick Warburton explains "stuck" with a chicken stuck in his shirt
- Malcolm-Jamal Warner
- Wendy Wasserstein
- Denzel Washington
- Naomi Watts explains "exchange" with Elmo and her then-husband Liev Schreiber and also appeared in "Elmo's Got the Moves"
- Tico Wells
- Rutina Wesley demonstrates the word "plan" with Elmo and Abby Cadabby
- Forest Whitaker defines "imagination" with Count von Count
- Lillias White season 21–24 cast member, 1 street scene: White appeared from 1989 through 1993 as "Lillian", a regular cast member of the show, winning a Daytime Emmy Award for her performance. During her stint, she also voiced the lead singer of The Squirrelles, a Muppet singing group, consisting of three squirrels. She returned in 2006 as a guest for a season 37 street scene, playing Gabi and Miles' kindergarten teacher Ms. Walsh, in a flashback sequence.
- Shaun White
- will.i.am sings "What I Am"
- Brian Williams demonstrates "squid" in a separately-recorded segment, and also as a guest news-anchor reporting that nobody on Sesame Street is sharing (due to a disease called "Mine-Itis")
- Jesse Williams defines "furious" with Elmo
- Joe Williams
- Mary Lou Williams
- Pharrell Williams
- Robin Williams (seven segments): Williams appeared numerous times in the 1990s and 2000s. In the first, aired in 1992 as episode 2963, Williams uses his shoe to demonstrate what makes something alive. Robin then appeared in a celebrity version of "Monster in the Mirror". Another segment has Robin comparing the similarities and difference between himself and a Muppet robin. In another segment, Williams asks Elmo and the kids whether they would allow a nonsense talking, horned two-headed stranger to play baseball with them. In 2000's episode 3684, Williams talks to Elmo about what you can do with a stick. In 2001's episode 3923, Williams shows off the wonders of feet. The Two Headed Monster shows up to play. In 2012's episode 4280, Williams defines the word "conflict" with The Two Headed Monster.
- Vanessa Williams performs "Sing" and the 1999 movie
- Venus Williams
- Wendy Williams defines the word "veterinarian"
- Chandra Wilson defines the word "half" with Murray
- Flip Wilson
- Mookie Wilson
- Oprah Winfrey on season 41 premiere, as the voice of 'O' on "The O Show"
- Debra Winger
- Henry Winkler
- Lee Ann Womack
- Stevie Wonder
- BD Wong
- Noah Wyle sings with Big Bird

== Y ==
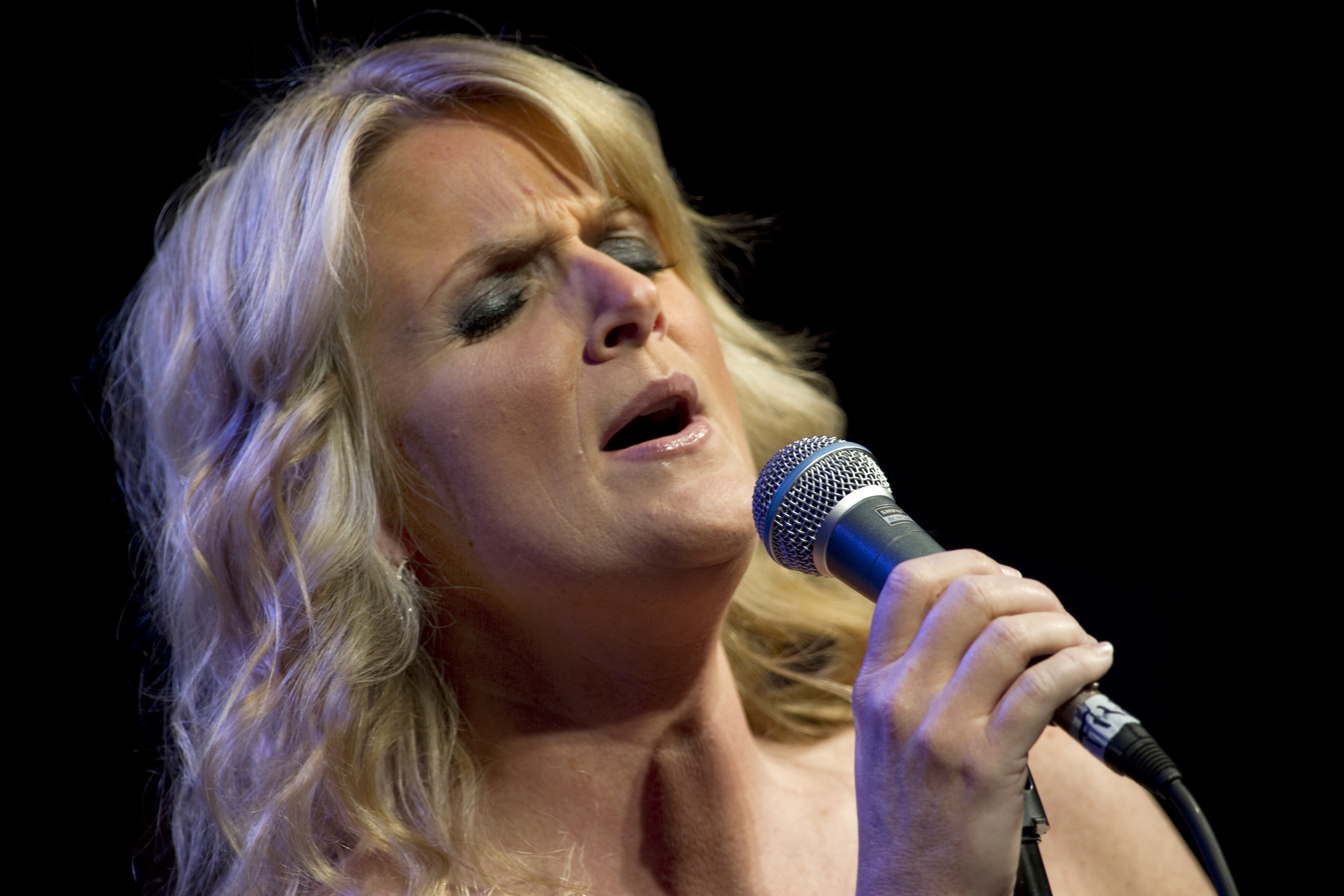
Trisha Yearwood
- Trisha Yearwood

== Z ==
- Zap Mama
