= Burnt offering (disambiguation) =

A burnt offering is a religious animal sacrifice that is completely consumed by fire.

Burnt offering, Burnt Offering, or Burnt Offerings may also refer to:

== Literature ==
- Burnt Offering (novel) a 1929 novel by Jeanne Galzy
- Burnt Offerings (Marasco novel), a 1973 novel by Robert Marasco
- Burnt Offerings (Hamilton novel), a 1998 novel by Laurell K. Hamilton

== Music ==
- Burnt Offering (album), a 1991 album by Jimmy Lyons and Andrew Cyrille
- Burnt Offering, a 2014 album by the Budos Band
- Burnt Offerings (album), a 1995 album by Iced Earth
- "Burnt Offerings", a 1987 song by Testament from The Legacy
- "Set the World Afire", or "Burnt Offerings", a 1988 song by Megadeth from So Far, So Good... So What!

== Other uses ==
- Burnt offering (Judaism), a form of sacrifice first described in the Hebrew Bible
- Burnt Offerings (film), a 1976 film by Dan Curtis
