= Child's Play (1972 film) =

1972 film by Sidney Lumet

- Theatrical release poster
- Directed by: Sidney Lumet
- Screenplay by: Leon Prochnik
- Based on: Child's Play by Robert Marasco
- Produced by: David Merrick
- Starring: James Mason; Robert Preston; Beau Bridges
- Cinematography: Gerald Hirschfeld
- Edited by: Joanne Burke; Edward Warschilka
- Music by: Michael Small
- Production company: Paramount Pictures
- Distributed by: Paramount Pictures
- Release date: December 12, 1972
- Running time: 101 minutes
- Country: United States
- Language: English

Child's Play is a 1972 American psychological thriller film directed by Sidney Lumet, and starring James Mason, Robert Preston, and Beau Bridges. Based on the 1970 play of the same name by Robert Marasco, it follows a newly-hired gym teacher at a Catholic boys' boarding school who becomes embroiled in a bitter dispute between two older teachers, exposing sinister goings-on within the school.

The film was released by Paramount Pictures on December 12, 1972. Mason's performance was nominated for a New York Film Critics Circle Award for Best Actor.

== Plot ==
Paul Reis, a graduate of the St. Charles Catholic boarding school for boys, is hired as a physical education teacher at his alma mater. There, he is reunited with headmaster Father Frank Mozian, English teacher Joseph Dobbs, and Greek and Latin teacher Jerome Malley. Malley, who lives with and cares for his infirm mother, is feared and hated by his students for his coarse demeanor. Malley alleges that students at the school have retaliated against him by making obscene prank calls to his mother while he is at work.

Paul quickly observes a highly contentious relationship between Dobbs and Malley, with Dobbs coveting Malley's position in the school and hoping for him to retire. Paul also witnesses the students engaging in malevolent and bullying behavior amongst each other, including an altercation in which Travis, a pupil, is beaten in the gym locker room. Faculty member Father Penny informs Paul that the students have seriously injured six different classmates. Another violent altercation occurs in which submissive student Freddie Banks is brutally beaten by several classmates. After meeting with Freddie, Paul deduces that Freddie had in fact welcomed the abuse, and that the boys may have a secret pact.

Father Mozian confronts Malley about his ill repute amongst the students, and Malley accuses Dobbs of writing a profane letter about him that has been passed among the students. In the chapel, Dobbs approaches Malley, who accuses him of being behind the crude phone calls received by his mother. After the men depart at opposite ends of the chapel, several boys hiding in a confessional remove a life-size statue of Jesus from the church altar before tying a brutalized classmate to it. A horrified Father Griffin discovers the dazed boy the following morning during his preparation for mass.

After the incident, Father Mozian ceases all mass services and forces students to leave the school building after class. Meanwhile, Malley's mother's condition worsens, but he refuses to take time off, and becomes increasingly agitated, accusing Paul of plotting against him with Dobbs. Malley begins searching for a pornographic magazine he claims Dobbs sent him. Later that afternoon, Paul is startled in the lounge by the sound of an object hitting the door. Outside, he finds a framed picture of Jesus with his eyes gouged out. Malley subsequently learns his mother has died, and bitterly blames Dobbs.

Fearing the students are prowling in the school against Father Mozian's orders, Paul mentions Malley's accusations to Dobbs. After his mother's funeral, Malley returns to the school. Father Mozian informs the staff that the Archdiocese has threatened to shutter the school for the term should another violent incident take place. Later, Father Mozian confront Malley with the pornographic magazine which he discovered in his office. Malley insists the magazine was sent to his home, again accusing Dobbs. Despite Father Mozian's insistence, Malley refuses to resign. Father Mozian admit to Paul that Dobbs did in fact send Malley the magazine, leading Paul to realize that Malley's accusations against Dobbs have been true. In the lounge, Dobbs admits that he gave the magazine to Father Mozian, claiming he did so to protect his students. In a rage, Malley lashes out at Dobbs for turning the staff and students against him, before rushing to the school's rooftop and throwing himself off a ledge to his death.

Later, as the school prepares to shut down, Dobbs accepts a job at another boys' school. Paul finds a grade book which reveals that all of the students who earned high grades in Malley's class were the same students who were attacked and brutalized. Realizing Dobbs's deception and manipulation, he confronts Dobbs and his devoted pupils. The boys respond by reciting a Latin quote about trust before viciously attacking Paul. In the chapel, Dobbs sits quietly in a pew, surrounded by a group of threatening students.

== Cast ==
- James Mason as Jerome Malley
- Robert Preston as Joseph Dobbs
- Beau Bridges as Paul Reis
- Ron Weyand as Father Frank Mozian
- Charles White as Father William Griffin
- David Rounds as Father George Penny
- Kate Harrington as Mrs. Carter
- Brian Chapin as O'Donnell
- Bryant Fraser as Jennings
- Tom Leopold as Shea
- Christopher Man as Travis
- Paul O'Keefe as Freddie Banks

== Production ==
=== Development ===
Before hiring Sidney Lumet, Merrick approached Orson Welles about directing.

=== Casting ===
Marlon Brando originally signed for the role of Joseph Dobbs, but dropped out of the film after three days of rehearsals. Brando had requested various changes to the screenplay and also insisted that his friend Wally Cox be cast as Father George Penny. Brando was replaced by Robert Preston, and first-time film producer David Merrick sued Brando for breach of contract.

The role of Father Penny ultimately went to David Rounds, the only original cast member who appeared in the Broadway production.name=:0/>

=== Filming ===
Filming of Child's Play took place at Marymount Secondary School in Tarrytown, New York. Students from Iona Preparatory School in New Rochelle, New York served as extras on the film.

== Release ==
Paramount Pictures released Child's Play in the United States, premiering it in New York City on December 12, 1972, and in Los Angeles the following day.

=== Home media ===
Olive Films released Child's Play on DVD and Blu-ray on September 4, 2012. Cinématographe reissued a Blu-ray edition on January 28, 2025.

== Reception ==
=== Critical response ===
Roger Ebert of the Chicago Sun-Times gave the film 2.5 stars out of 4 and wrote "'Child’s Play,' which is beautifully acted and very nicely directed, doesn't seem to know whether it’s really about the supernatural or not ... the entire movie is set up to suggests supernatural overtones, so when we get a rather conventional, Freudian, ending, we’re disappointed. The original fault lies with Robert Marasco's Broadway play, I suppose. But it could have been fixed for the movie."

Vincent Canby of The New York Times wrote "With the exception of the performance of Mr. Mason, who is fine as the mad, exhausted Latin teacher, everything in 'Child's Play' seems to be rather cheaply tricky — such as the low-range photography and floor lighting designed to throw faces into eerie relief. In a more thoughtful film, the screen play and the performances might have been expected to create the sense of true menace and mystery. Even more irritating is the soundtrack, full of ominous clicking noises that are so loud and so resonant that one can't believe that the characters inside the film can't hear them, too."

Variety called the film "a taut and suspenseful drama," further stating that "Sidney Lumet's direction catches the mood and spirit of an unhealthy situation and he makes every move count," and Mason gives a "solid performance."

Gene Siskel of the Chicago Tribune rated the film 2 stars out of 4 and wrote "Because the look of the film is so artificial, and because the guilty party can be only one person—the only one with a genuine motive—Child's Play is a small disaster as both horror story and mystery."

A positive review from Charles Champlin of the Los Angeles Times called the film "a superior psychological thriller" that "works a few mild deceptions on the audience to achieve its ends, but no one is likely to care very much. Getting there is all the scary pleasure." Champlin added that "Mason's performance, in its power and also in its subtle shifting, ranks with the best portrayals in his long, impressive career."

Gary Arnold of The Washington Post wrote "In a better play or movie we might have learned what makes one man despise another so intensely that he thinks he's justified in destroying him. In 'Child's Play' we get a load of ominous, evil-minded humbug, a vicious dumb show with schoolboys acting like zombie killers, constantly lurking in the shadows and inflicting nasty accidents."

== See also ==
- List of American films of 1972

== Sources ==
- Malone, Aubrey (2020). Sidney Lumet: The Actor's Director. Jefferson, North Carolina: McFarland & Company. ISBN 978-1-476-67553-4.
