= Child's Play (play) =

1970 play

Child's Play is a stage play written by Robert Marasco. It opened on Broadway on 12 February 1970 at the Royale Theatre and ran for 342 performances, closing on 12 December. The play was produced by David Merrick and directed by Joseph Hardy, with settings by Jo Mielziner. The leading roles were taken by Pat Hingle, Fritz Weaver and Ken Howard.

Marasco's only produced play, he initially wrote the script in 1966 under the title The Dark. The atmosphere of the play, although not the plot, was derived from Marasco's experiences as a teacher of Latin and Greek at Regis High School, a highly regarded Jesuit school in Manhattan.

The play was presented in London's West End in 1971, opening at the Queen's Theatre on 16 March. As on Broadway, the director and designer were, respectively, Hardy and Mielziner, with Laurence Harvey, Rupert Davies and Derek Fowlds in the cast.

In 1972, Sidney Lumet directed a screen adaptation under the same title, starring James Mason, Robert Preston and Beau Bridges.

== Synopsis ==
The play centers on the rivalry between two faculty members at St. Charles, an exclusive Roman Catholic boarding school for boys. Joe Dobbs is an easy-going, well-liked English teacher, while Latin and Greek instructor Jerome Malley is feared and hated by his students for his strict disciplinary methods. Malley is caring for his dying mother, and his stress is exacerbated by a series of threatening phone calls and written notes he receives. He is certain Dobbs is the source, but his caustic personality prevents him from winning any sympathy or support. Into the fray comes Paul Reese, a former student who has been hired to teach PE, and he soon finds his loyalty torn between the friendly Dobbs and Malley, as he becomes increasingly aware of the latter's personal torments. Compounding his situation is the realization that the unbridled violence practiced by the students may be the result of demonic possession.

== Plot ==
Joe Dobbs is speaking to McArdle, one of his students, who was caught calling Jerome Malley in the middle of the night and who is trying to get Dobbs to intervene on his behalf. Dobbs makes no promises to McArdle and the latter heads to the headmaster for a meeting. Paul Reese, an alumnus of the school, now teaching history and PE, leaves the faculty room to act as a referee for a basketball game played by the boys. As Reese is heading toward the gym, he runs into Fr. Griffin, who tells him to keep an eye on the boys because they have been having disciplinary issues lately.

Back in the faculty room, Dobbs confronts Reese about McArdle and implores him to go easy on him. After Malley leaves, Fr. Griffin asks Dobbs to see if he can understand why the boys have been violent (as they have had more fights and injuries in the past few weeks than ever) since he and the headmaster can't seem to get anything out of the students. They are hoping that Dobbs, the "grand old man" of the faculty, can get the students to cooperate. Fr. Griffin leaves to patrol the halls when Malley returns, and Malley and Dobbs talk about McArdle's punishment, which is an indefinite suspension. During this conversation, Malley says all the students hate him because Dobbs is setting them against him, a charge which Dobbs vehemently denies. It is at this time that Reese comes running into the room carrying a bloody Freddy Banks and screaming for help.

A couple of hours later, Dobbs and Fr. Griffin return from the hospital and meet with Reese and Fr. Mozian, the headmaster. As a result of the incident, Freddy loses his eye, and his mother takes him out of the school, accusing the administration of being negligent in their duties. Fr. Mozian and Fr. Griffin interrogate Reese on what happened: Reese claims that the boys got in a circle around Freddy while playing dodgeball and one of them threw the ball full force at Freddy from close range.

Freddy did nothing to protect himself; then the boys started to beat up Freddy, and once again Freddy did nothing to protect himself. Reese claims that the seniors tried to hold him and that he had to actually fight his way to Freddy, and that Freddy actually tried to get away from him. After the meeting, Fr. Mozian confronts Malley about his strict methods, imploring him to lighten up on the boys. As proof of how much the students hate him, Fr. Mozian shows Malley an unflattering note that he caught students passing in class about Malley, who claims Dobbs wrote the note and that he is manipulating everybody in the school against him.

After the meeting, Dobbs goes to the school chapel to pray for the boys. Several minutes later, Malley follows to pray for his sick and dying mother. Once again Dobbs and Malley talk. Malley accuses Dobbs of calling his mother every night and telling her terrible lies about Malley, and he begs Dobbs to stop for his mother's sake to ease her passing. Dobbs once again denies the charges and leaves the chapel.

Malley follows several minutes later. During this time the students arrive near the chapel. Once the chapel is empty, McArdle, Wilson, Carre, and Banks carry a bleeding Travis into the chapel and tie him onto the cross. They flee. Fr. Griffin and Fr. Mozian enter a few moments later and discover Travis. They take him down from the cross, and the headmaster orders the chapel closed until further notice.

The next morning word comes down from the headmaster's office that the chapel is closed, all extracurricular activities are canceled, and the gym is off-limits except for gym class. Reese and Malley talk when Fr. Griffin and Dobbs go to class, and Reese realizes that he was wrong about Malley all along — not only was he a good teacher, but he was not as mean as they thought he was. Malley admits that he can be too hard on the students at times, but he says that's just the way he is. During this conversation, Malley gets a phone call from his mother's nurse informing him of his mother's death.

Several days later, Reese leaves a faculty meeting as a result of the rest of the faculty's attempts to put all the blame on Malley for the violence and unrest of the past several weeks. A drunk Fr. Penny talks to him about the boys, telling Reese that he's had a revelation that the boys are clearly possessed. After Fr. Penny goes to bed, Reese gets the urge to deliberately cut his hand on a piece of glass. Dobbs comes storming out of the meeting and talks with Reese while patching up his hand. Reese shows his displeasure that the administration has elected Malley as their scapegoat, and says, much to Dobbs's confusion, that there is something else in the school scaring him, even though Malley hasn't been at school in three days. During this conversation, a beaten-up Carre is thrown off the balcony in the faculty room, down the stairs, to Reese's and Dobbs's shock.

Malley returns to work only to find that he has been fired because inappropriate mail addressed to him was discovered at the school. Malley claims once again that Dobbs has been sending him these letters in an attempt to break him. Fr. Mozian doesn't believe any of this and storms out of the room after officially terminating Malley's contract at the school. Reese comes in and tries to calm Malley. Malley tells Reese how Dobbs has been trying to destroy him, much to Reese's surprise. Dobbs comes into the room and tells Malley that he no longer belongs there.

Reese confronts Dobbs about the accusations, and once again Dobbs denies them. After these last denials, Malley attempts to go after Dobbs, but Reese restrains him. At this, Malley rushes up the stairs and throws himself out the window. Reese tries to run to save Malley, but Dobbs tries to stop him. Reese hits Dobbs to get free, but it is too late to save Malley.

After Malley's death, the school is immediately closed. Reese returns to the faculty room to pack his things and leave. Dobbs comes in several minutes later, and Reese once again confronts him. Dobbs says how he walked a long way looking for help, but couldn't find any at the church he went into to make his confession. When Dobbs's students enter the faculty room, Dobbs admits that he did in fact torment Malley to get him out of his life, and that he didn't mean for Malley to kill himself. Dobbs orders Reese to leave so that he can make his confession to the boys. When Reese leaves, Dobbs frantically pleads for mercy from the boys as they surround him. The lights go dark for the last time in the show as the first punch is thrown at Dobbs.

== Opening night cast ==
- Pat Hingle ... Joseph Dobbs
- Fritz Weaver ... Jerome Malley
- Ken Howard ... Paul Reese
- David Rounds ... Father George Penny
- Peter MacLean ... Father William Griffin
- Michael McGuire ... Father Mozian
- Lloyd Kramer ... McArdle
- Bryant Fraser ... Carre
- John Handy ... Travis
- Robbie Reed ... Banks
- Ron Martin ... Wilson
- Mark Hall ... Jennings
- Patrick Shea...Shea

== Awards and nominations ==
- Tony Award for Best Play (nominee)
- Tony Award for Best Actor in Play (Fritz Weaver, winner)
- Tony Award for Best Featured Actor in a Play (Ken Howard, winner)
- Tony Award for Best Scenic Design (Jo Mielziner, winner)
- Tony Award for Best Lighting Design (Jo Mielziner, winner)
- Tony Award for Best Direction of a Play (Joseph Hardy, winner)
- Theatre World Award (David Rounds, winner)
- Drama Desk Award for Outstanding Set Design (Jo Mielziner, winner)
- Drama Desk Award for Outstanding Performance (Fritz Weaver, winner)
- Drama Desk Award for Outstanding Director (Joseph Hardy, winner)
