= Robert Marasco =

American novelist and playwright (1936–1998)

- Born: September 22, 1936; The Bronx, New York City, New York, U.S.
- Died: December 6, 1998 (aged 62); Manhasset, New York, U.S.
- Education: Fordham University
- Occupation: Writer
- Writing career
- Notable works: Child's Play; Burnt Offerings; Parlor Games

Robert Marasco (September 22, 1936 – December 6, 1998) was an American horror novelist, playwright, and teacher. He is best known for his 1970 Broadway play Child's Play, and his supernatural novel Burnt Offerings (1973), which was adapted into a 1976 film of the same name.

== Early life ==
Born in the Bronx, New York City, Marasco attended Regis High School in Manhattan and graduated from Fordham University. After graduating from college, Marasco taught Latin at his high school alma mater.

== Career ==
During his time teaching at Regis High School, Marasco wrote Child's Play. Child's Play debuted at the Royale Theater in New York on February 17, 1970. Starring Pat Hingle and Ken Howard, the play dealt with demonic doings at a Roman Catholic boys' school. Marasco drew both on his experience as a teacher of Latin and Greek classics at Regis High School and a newspaper account he had read about a teacher who, after assigning his students some homework, immediately killed himself by jumping out of a window.

Child's Play garnered a rave review on opening night from Clive Barnes of The New York Times, followed by a Tony Award nomination for Best Play of the Year. The production ran for 342 performances between February and December 1970. Following a less successful London production at the Queen's Theatre in 1971, the play was made into a film in 1972; Sidney Lumet directed, and the cast included James Mason, Robert Preston, and Beau Bridges.

After Child's Play, he published two novels: Burnt Offerings in 1973, and Parlor Games in 1979. Burnt Offerings was adapted into a 1976 film directed by Dan Curtis, starring Karen Black and Oliver Reed, with such veteran actors as Burgess Meredith, Eileen Heckart, and Bette Davis in small roles.

== Later life and death ==
Marasco spent his later life in High Falls, New York. He died of lung cancer at North Shore University Hospital in Manhasset on December 6, 1998, leaving several unproduced screenplays and the finished play, Our Sally. He was survived by his father, Anthony Marasco, and his sister, Carole Melillo.

== Written works ==
=== Plays ===
- Child's Play (1970)
- Our Sally

=== Novels ===
- Burnt Offerings (1973; reprinted 2015)
- Parlor Games (1979)
