= De Banzie =

De Banzie is a Scottish surname. Notable people with the surname include:

- Brenda de Banzie (1909–1981), English actress
- Lois de Banzie (1930–2021) Scottish-born American actress
