= Moon River (Lawrence Welk album) =

Studio album by Lawrence Welk and His Orchestra
- Released: 1961
- Genre: Easy listening
- Label: Dot

Moon River is an album by Lawrence Welk and His Orchestra. It was released in 1961 on the Dot label (catalog no. DLP-25412).

The album debuted on Billboard magazine's popular albums chart on January 13, 1962, reached the No. 4 spot, and remained on that chart for 43 weeks

AllMusic gave the album a rating of four stars. Reviewer Greg Adams praised the album's "sweeping melodies" and noted that the arrangements were "more serious in tone than Welk's usual lighthearted fare."

== Track listing ==
Side 1

1. "Moon River" (Henry Mancini, Johnny Mercer) [2:35]
2. "Tonight" (Leonard Bernstein) [2:13]
3. "Exodus" (Ernest Gold) [3:03]
4. "Around the World" (Victor Young, Harold Adamson) [2:24]
5. "The Sound of Music" (Rodgers and Hammerstein) [2:50]
6. "Till There Was You" (Meredith Willson) [2:40]

Side 2

1. "I Could Have Danced All Night" (Lerner & Loewe) [2:40]
2. "You Gave Me Wings" (C. Coveny) [2:36]
3. "Some Enchanted Evening" (Rodgers and Hammerstein) [3:05]
4. "Wish You Were Here" (Harold Rome) [2:25]
5. "Love Is a Many-Splendored Thing" (Phil Francis Webster, Sammy Fain) [2:36]
6. "You'll Never Walk Alone" (Rodgers and Hammerstein) [2:11]
