= David Rounds =

American actor (1930–1983)

David Rounds (October 9, 1930, Bronxville, New York – December 9, 1983, Lomontville, Ulster County, New York) was an American actor of stage and screen. He received both a Tony Award and a Drama Desk Award in 1980 for his role in Morning's at Seven. He served as a lieutenant in the United States Navy during the Korean War.

Rounds played several reoccurring television roles, including appearing as Wendell in two episodes of the sitcom Alice. He played Christopher Spencer in the miniseries The Blue and The Grey. His last New York appearance was in the one-man show Herringbone at Playwrights Horizons a year before his death from cancer at age 53.

== Filmography ==
=== Film ===
Year	Title	Role
1972	Child's Play	Father Penny
1978	King of the Gypsies	Mr. Kessler
1981	So Fine	Professor McCarthy
1982	Burned at the Stake	William Goode

=== Television ===
Year	Title	Role	Notes
1972	You Are There	Charles VII	1 Episode
1975	The American Parade	Coffroth	Episode: The Case Against Milligan
1975	Beacon Hill	Terence O'Hara	13 Episode
1976	Mary Hartman, Mary Hartman	The Mortician	4 Episodes
1976	The Tony Randall Show	Edwin Marden	Episode: Pilot
1977	Ryan's Hope	Monsieur Thibault	1 Episode
1977	Barnaby Jones	Dr. Dover	Episode: The Wife Beater
1981	Family Reunion	Grover Winfield	Television Movie
1981-1983	Alice	Wendell	2 Episodes
1982	The Elephant Man	Lord John	Television Movie
1982	The Blue and the Gray	Christopher Spencer	3 Episodes

=== Stage ===
Year	Title	Role	Notes
1964	Foxy	Stirling	Ziegfeld Theatre, Broadway
1967	Cabaret	Ernst Ludwig	National Tour
1970	Child's Play	Father George Penny	Royale Theatre, Broadway
1970	The Rothschilds	Jacob Rothschild (Replacement)/Nathan Rothschild (Replacement)	Lunt-Fontanne Theatre, Broadway
1972	The Last of Mrs. Lincoln	Robert Lincoln	Anta Theatre, Broadway
1972	The Real Inspector Hound	Moon	Theater Four, Off-Broadway
1976	The Baker's Wife	Priest	National Tour
1977	Romeo and Juliet	Mercutio	Circle in the Square Theatre, Broadway
1979	Morning's at Seven	Homer Bolton	Academy Festival Theatre
1979	Damn Yankees	Mr. Applegate	Hartford Stage Company
1980	Morning's at Seven	Homer Bolton	Lyceum Theatre, Broadway
1981	Herringbone	Various	St. Nicholas Theatre Company
1982	Herringbone	Various	Playwrights Horizons, Off-Broadway

== Awards and nominations ==
Year	Award	Category	Nominated work	Result
1970	Theatre World Award	Theatre World Award	Child's Play	Won
1979	Joseph Jefferson Awards	Actor in a Supporting Role	Morning's at Seven	Won
1980	Drama Desk Awards	Outstanding Featured Actor in a Play	Morning's at Seven	Won
1980	Tony Awards	Best Featured Actor in a Play	Morning's at Seven	Won
1982	Joseph Jefferson Awards	Actor in a Principal Role in a Musical	Herringbone	Won
