= Chicken Fat (song) =

1962 song by Meredith Willson

"Chicken Fat" (also known as "The Youth Fitness Song") is a 1962 song written by Broadway composer Meredith Willson (The Music Man, The Unsinkable Molly Brown) and performed by actor Robert Preston. It was commissioned as part of the President's Council on Physical Fitness.

== History ==
"Chicken Fat" was the theme song for President John F. Kennedy's youth fitness program, and millions of 7-inch 33 RPM discs which were pressed for free by Capitol Records were heard in elementary, junior high school and high school gymnasiums across the United States throughout the 1960s and 1970s. Willson contacted Fitness Council administrator Dick Snider with an offer to write a song to be used to promote exercise for children. Willson's offer was accepted and he consulted with Physical Fitness Council director Ted Forbes to ensure that the song would be effective. The bouncy chorus ended with the words "Go, you chicken fat, go!"

The song was originally recorded on a Warner Bros. Pictures soundstage in early 1962 at the same time as the recordings for the soundtrack of the Warner Bros. musical film The Music Man, starring Robert Preston. Recorded on the same three-track 35mm magnetic film as the soundtrack recordings, Preston's vocal is isolated on one track, with the Bernie Green Orchestra on the second track and a chorus of boys and girls on the third track; however, the original multi-track tapes are now lost. As a result, with only the full-track quarter-inch 15 IPS monophonic composite master tape being available from which Capitol mastered their records in 1962, no stereophonic version of the song is currently possible and the recording remains in monophonic sound on the compact disc reissue.

== Versions ==
Two versions of the song exist: a 2:12 minute, radio-friendly length, “Disc Jockey Version"; and a longer, 6:30 “School Version”, for use in educational institution gymnasiums. The latter included 11 floor exercises for school children designed by Bud Wilkinson, the head coach of the University of Oklahoma football team. Willson, Preston, and Forbes all donated their services to the project, while Capitol Records, which produced and distributed three million copies of the 33 1/3 RPM record, paid for the backup musicians, studio time, and production and distribution. The original Physical Fitness Council was promoted in 1962 and 1963 through a series of public service TV commercials featuring baseball player Stan Musial, filmed at Roosevelt Elementary School in Tampa, Florida.

== In popular culture ==
In 2014, "Chicken Fat" was used in a TV commercial by Apple Inc. to promote its new iOS 8 health application. The commercial shows people swimming, running, and checking their weight while connected to iPhone apps and accessories to a recording of "Chicken Fat". It was reported to be a 2000 recording by Bernie Knee, a jingle writer and part-time cantor, which was released by Kimbo Educational Music, though he died in 1994. Separately, it was reported that it was a new recording but that Apple would not name the singer.

"We're Going to the Catskills!" (2018 Season 2, Episode 4) of The Marvelous Mrs. Maisel used "Chicken Fat" as the morning calisthenics song for Abe (Tony Shalhoub), despite the anachronism (the episode takes place in 1959).
