= The Strange Vengeance of Rosalie =

1972 film by Jack Starrett

- Directed by: Jack Starrett
- Written by: Anthony Greville-Bell; John Kohn
- Based on: The Chicken by Miles Tripp
- Produced by: John Kohn
- Starring: Bonnie Bedelia
- Cinematography: Ray Parslow
- Edited by: Thom Noble
- Music by: John Cameron
- Production company: Palomar Pictures
- Distributed by: 20th Century Fox
- Release date: June 16, 1972
- Running time: 107 minutes
- Country: United States
- Language: English

The Strange Vengeance of Rosalie is a 1972 American thriller film directed by Jack Starrett and starring Bonnie Bedelia and Ken Howard.

== Plot ==
A traveling salesman is lured by an odd teenage girl to what she claims is her grandfather's shack in the desert. A scuzzy biker comes along, and they both find themselves dominated and tormented by him.

== Cast ==
- Bonnie Bedelia as Rosalie
- Ken Howard as Virgil
- Anthony Zerbe as Frye
