= Dunsmuir House =

Historic house in California, United States

Coordinates: 37°44′34″N 122°08′28″W

- U.S. National Register of Historic Places
- Oakland Designated Landmark
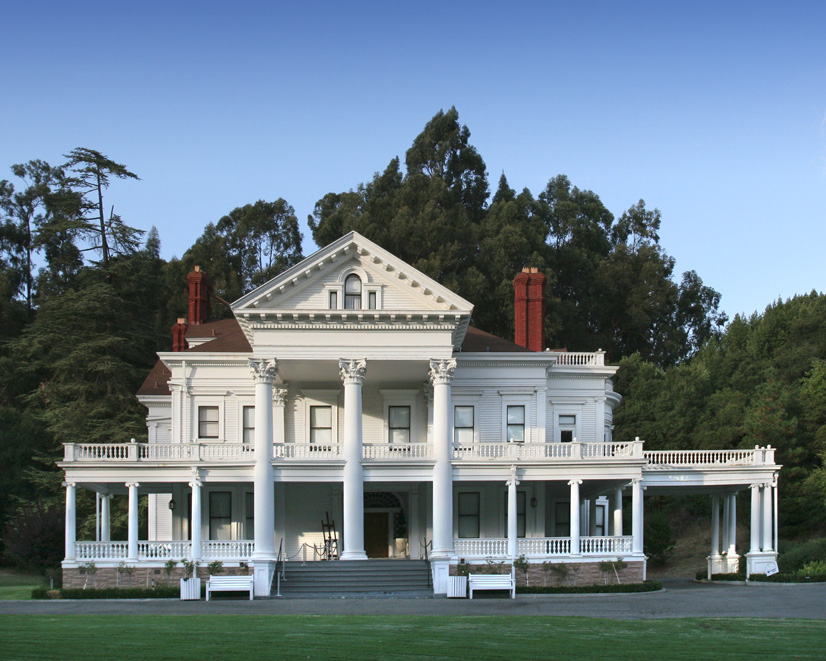

- Location within Oakland, California Location within California Location within the United States
- Location: Oakland, California
- Built: 1899
- Architect: J. Eugene Freeman
- Architectural style: Neoclassical Revival
- NRHP reference No.: 72000214
- ODL No.: 37

Significant dates
- Added to NRHP: May 19, 1972
- Designated ODL: 1980

The Dunsmuir House and Gardens (also known by the name The Dunsmuir-Hellman Historic Estate and previously known as Oakvale Park) is located in Oakland, California on a 50-acre (200,000 m^{2}) site. The Dunsmuir House has a neoclassical-revival architectural style and is listed in the U.S. National Register of Historic Places. It is now used primarily for weddings, receptions, business gatherings, and historical reenactment events.

== History ==
The house was built in 1899 by Alexander Dunsmuir, son of Robert Dunsmuir, a wealthy coal magnate from Victoria, BC. Dunsmuir, who came to the San Francisco Bay Area in 1878 to manage the family business, intended the house to be a wedding gift for his new bride but didn't get to live in it with her as he fell ill and died while on his honeymoon in New York. His new bride returned to live in the home but soon died herself in 1901.

I.W. Hellman Jr. purchased the estate in 1906 as a summer home for his family and by 1913 the mansion was remodeled for the larger family's needs as well as to hold their growing acquisitions from European travel.

Mrs. Hellman kept the estate well into the 1950s after her husband's death in 1920. During this time additions included the swimming pool and Dinkelspiel House and a good deal of landscape development on the northern end of the estate.

In the early 1960s, the mansion and lands were purchased by the City of Oakland with the intention of using it as a conference center. When this project didn't work out, a non-profit organization was formed in 1971 to preserve and restore the estate for the public benefit and for many years, the non-profit group and the City jointly operated the estate.

In June 1989, the non-profit organization took over most of the administrative duties and dubbed the grounds the Dunsmuir House and Gardens with its primary function to be as an educational, historical, cultural, and horticultural resource. The mansion has been listed on the National Register of Historic Places by the United States Department of the Interior and both the mansion and the Carriage house have been designated Historic Landmarks by the City of Oakland.

== Grounds and gardens ==
Golden Gate Park's landscape architect, John McLaren, is rumored to have assisted the Hellmans in designing the Dunsmuir gardens which includes a wide variety of trees, including Camperdown Elms, Bunya-Bunya and Hornbeam trees. In addition, the Hellman estate contained a golf course, formal croquet court, tennis court, swimming pool with Mission-style bathhouse, glass conservatory with grotto, an elaborate aviary, formal garden maze, and Japanese garden. Deer, wild turkeys and water fowl also make the estate their home.

== Mansion ==
The Dunsmuir mansion was designed by the San Francisco architect J. Eugene Freeman and is an example of Neoclassical-Revival architecture which was popular in the late 1800s. The 37-room mansion is 16,224 square feet and features 10 fireplaces, a Tiffany-style dome, wood paneled public rooms and inlaid parquet floors. The servant quarters in the house are designed to accommodate 12 live-in staff.

== Current uses ==
Docents lead tours of the estate grounds and the 37-room Dunsmuir Mansion on Wednesdays and the first Sunday of the month from April – September (except for July).

The non-profit organization rents out all or part of the property for various occasions such as weddings, corporate engagements, auctions, and historic reenactment gatherings. However, the estate has also been used as a location or background for several movies and television shows, such as:

- Burnt Offerings (1976)
- Phantasm (1979)
- Partners in Crime (1984)
- A View to a Kill (1985)
- The Vineyard (1989)
- So I Married an Axe Murderer (1993)
- Nash Bridges (1996)
- Gloria (1999)
- True Crime (1999)
- Case #13 (2014)
- Delirium (2018)
