= Lois de Banzie =

Scottish-born American actress (1930–2021)

- Born: 4 May 1930; Glasgow, Scotland, U.K.
- Died: 3 April 2021 (aged 90); Greenbrae, California, U.S.
- Occupation: Actress
- Spouse: Lamartine Le Goullon (m. 1956; div. 1957)

Lois de Banzie (4 May 1930 – 3 April 2021) was a Scottish-American stage, film, and television actress.

== Family and early life ==
Her paternal grandfather was Edward de Banzie, a conductor and musical director. He was the father of actress Brenda de Banzie.

Lois grew up in Glasgow, and in 1952 moved to New York, aged 21. She worked as a copywriter at Vogue and Time magazines, then as an editorial assistant at Henry Holt and Company.

In 1956 she married artist Lamartine Le Goullon, divorcing within a year.

== Career ==
=== Theatre ===
De Banzie's appeared in Paul Osborn's play Morning's at Seven, which ran for 564 performances, and resulted in a Drama Desk Award and Tony Award nomination.

Her other Broadway credits include The Octette Bridge Club, Da, and The Last of Mrs. Lincoln.

=== Television ===
De Banzie also had a career in television and movies, mostly appearing in small-to-mid-sized parts, but with guest roles in television programs. Her television credits include Baby Talk, Bodies of Evidence, Cheers, Diagnosis: Murder, Family Ties, Home Improvement, Major Dad, Mama's Family, Matlock, Murder, She Wrote, Sisters, Taxi, Hill Street Blues and Who's the Boss? among others.

=== Film ===
Her film credits include Addams Family Values, Annie, Arachnophobia, Big Business, Mass Appeal, Sister Act, and Tootsie. De Banzie also appeared in several episodes of CBS Radio Mystery Theatre.

== Death ==
De Banzie died in Greenbrae, California on April 3, 2021 at the age of 90.

== Partial filmography ==
| Year | Title | Role |
|---|---|---|
| 1981 | So Fine | Waitress in House of Pancakes |
| 1982 | Annie | Eleanor Roosevelt |
| 1982 | Tootsie | Autograph Hound #3 |
| 1983 | Sudden Impact | Judge Lundstrom |
| 1984 | Mass Appeal | Mrs. Dolson |
| 1988 | Big Business | Edwardian Room Hostess |
| 1990 | Arachnophobia | Henrietta Manley |
| 1992 | Sister Act | Immaculata |
| 1993 | Addams Family Values | Delivery Nurse |
| 1994 | Naked Gun 33 1/3: The Final Insult | Dr. Kohlzak |
| 1996 | Dunston Checks In | Mrs. Winthrop |
