= Morning's at Seven =

Play by Paul Osborn

Poster for the 2002 Broadway revival

Morning's at Seven is a play by Paul Osborn. Its plot focuses on four aging sisters living in a small Midwestern town in 1928, and it deals with ramifications within the family when two of them begin to question their lives and decide to make some changes before it’s too late.

The original Broadway production, directed by Joshua Logan, opened on November 30, 1939, at the Longacre Theatre, where it ran for 44 performances. Director Logan chose to set it in 1938, which at the end of the Depression and the beginning of World War II seemed to make it less palatable to the audiences of that time. The cast included Dorothy Gish, Jean Adair, Enid Markey, and Kate McComb.

Forty years later, a Broadway revival opened on April 10, 1980, after sixteen previews at the Lyceum Theatre. It was directed by Vivian Matalon and the cast included Nancy Marchand, Maureen O'Sullivan, Elizabeth Wilson, Teresa Wright, Lois de Banzie, and David Rounds. This production, set back to its original 1920s period, was a great success, running for 564 performances and receiving numerous Tony Awards and Drama Desk Awards.

After 27 previews, the second Broadway revival, directed by Daniel Sullivan, opened on April 21, 2002, once again at the Lyceum, where it ran for 112 performances. The cast included Elizabeth Franz, Frances Sternhagen, Estelle Parsons, Piper Laurie, Julie Hagerty, Buck Henry, Christopher Lloyd, William "Biff" McGuire, and Stephen Tobolowsky. It was a popular and critical success and received numerous Tony Award and Drama Desk Award nominations.

Over the decades since it was written, the play has proven to be a popular choice for regional, community, and summer stock theatre productions; but it has never been made into a theatrical motion picture.

== Television productions ==
The play has been performed on live television on several occasions. It was adapted by Robert Wallstens and performed on television as part of The Alcoa Hour's 1956/57 season; the air date was 4 November 1956. The cast included Lillian Gish in the role of Esther Crampton and her sister Dorothy Gish in the role of Arry Gibbs. June Lockhart, Dorothy Stickney, Evelyn Varden, and David Wayne were also in the cast.

In 1982, Vivian Matalon directed a television broadcast of the 1980 Broadway revival with Maureen O'Sullivan, Elizabeth Wilson, Teresa Wright, and Kate Reid replacing Nancy Marchand. The revival was first telecast on Showtime and later on PBS.

== Awards and nominations ==
=== 1980 Broadway revival ===
Award	Category	Nominee	Result
Tony Award	Best Reproduction		Won
Tony Award	Best Direction of a Play	Vivian Matalon	Won
Tony Award	Best Featured Actor in a Play	David Rounds	Won
Tony Award	Best Featured Actress in a Play	Lois de Banzie	Nominated
Drama Desk Award	Outstanding Featured Actor in a Play	David Rounds	Won
Drama Desk Award	Outstanding Featured Actress in a Play	Lois de Banzie	Won
Drama Desk Award	Outstanding Ensemble Performance		Won
Drama Desk Award	Outstanding Director of a Play	Vivian Matalon	Won
Drama Desk Award	Outstanding Costume Design	Linda Fisher	Nominated
Drama Desk Award	Outstanding Lighting Design	Richard Nelson	Nominated
Drama Desk Award	Outstanding Set Design	William Ritman	Nominated

=== 2002 Broadway revival ===
Award	Category	Nominee	Result
Tony Award	Best Revival of a Play		Nominated
Tony Award	Best Featured Actor in a Play	William Biff McGuire	Nominated
Tony Award	Best Featured Actor in a Play	Stephen Tobolowsky	Nominated
Tony Award	Best Featured Actress in a Play	Elizabeth Franz	Nominated
Tony Award	Best Featured Actress in a Play	Estelle Parsons	Nominated
Tony Award	Best Featured Actress in a Play	Frances Sternhagen	Nominated
Tony Award	Best Scenic Design	John Lee Beatty	Nominated
Tony Award	Best Costume Design	Jane Greenwood	Nominated
Tony Award	Best Direction of a Play	Daniel Sullivan	Nominated
Drama Desk Award	Outstanding Revival of a Play		Nominated
Drama Desk Award	Outstanding Featured Actress in a Play	Elizabeth Franz	Nominated
Drama Desk Award	Outstanding Set Design of a Play	John Lee Beatty	Nominated
