= Burnt Offerings (Marasco novel) =

Book by Robert Marasco

- First edition cover
- Author: Robert Marasco
- Language: English
- Genre: Horror novel
- Publisher: Delacorte Press
- Publication date: February 1, 1973
- Publication place: United States
- Media type: Print (hardcover and paperback)
- Pages: 260 (first printing)
- ISBN: 978-0-440-00928-3

Burnt Offerings is a 1973 American horror novel by Robert Marasco. Its plot follows a family who move into a summer home where each member is plagued by unusual experiences and personality changes. Published by Delacorte Press, the novel had originally been conceived as a screenplay before Marasco rewrote it into a novel. It was adapted into a film of the same name in 1976. The novel was reprinted in 2015 by Valancourt Press.

== Plot ==
The Rolfe family (Marian, Ben, and their son David) rent an isolated summer home in the remote North Fork of Suffolk County, New York at the extreme eastern end of Long Island to escape New York City and get away from their Queens apartment for the summer. Ben's aunt Elizabeth also moves into the home. Per their rental agreement, the Allardyces (the elderly siblings who own the home) stipulate that their elderly mother remain in her apartment in the top floor of the home and be fed three times a day, to which the Rolfes agree. Upon moving in, however, each member of the family is plagued by bizarre experiences, personality shifts, and inner turmoil that seems to be stemming from the house itself.

== Critical reception ==
The New York Times declared that the novel "terrifies," writing that the "style is just opaque enough to keep us guessing what's real and what's imagined."

== Publications ==
- 1973, Delacorte Press (first edition)
- 1976, Dell Books (movie tie-in)
- 2012, Centipede Press (limited to 150 copies)
- 2015, Valancourt Press

== Adaptations ==
The novel was adapted into a 1976 film of the same name starring Karen Black, Oliver Reed, and Bette Davis.
