= Meredith Willson =

American composer, conductor, musical arranger, and bandleader (1902–1984)

- Willson c. 1961
- Born: Robert Reiniger Meredith Willson; May 18, 1902; Mason City, Iowa, U.S.
- Died: June 15, 1984 (aged 82); Santa Monica, California, U.S.
- Occupations: Flautist; composer; conductor; playwright; bandleader; author
- Years active: 1921−1982

Robert Reiniger Meredith Willson (May 18, 1902 – June 15, 1984) was an American composer, lyricist, and playwright.

He is perhaps best known for writing the book, music, and lyrics for the 1957 hit Broadway musical The Music Man and "It's Beginning to Look a Lot Like Christmas" (1951).

Willson wrote three other musicals, two of which appeared on Broadway, and composed symphonies and popular songs. He was twice nominated for Academy Awards for film scores.

== Early life ==
Willson was born in Mason City, Iowa, to Rosalie Reiniger Willson and John David Willson. He had a brother two years his senior, John Cedrick, and a sister 12 years his senior, children's writer Dixie Willson. Willson attended Frank Damrosch's Institute of Musical Art (which later became The Juilliard School) in New York City. He married his high-school sweetheart, Elizabeth "Peggy" Wilson, on August 29, 1920; they were married for 26 years.

As a child, Willson played the bass drum for a Salvation Army band. He became a flute and piccolo virtuoso accomplished enough to become a member of John Philip Sousa's band (1921–1924) and later the New York Philharmonic Orchestra under Arturo Toscanini (1924–1929). He then moved to San Francisco, California, as the concert director for radio station KFRC, and then as a musical director for the NBC radio network in Hollywood. His on-air radio debut came on KFRC in 1928 on Blue Monday Jamboree.

== Hollywood ==
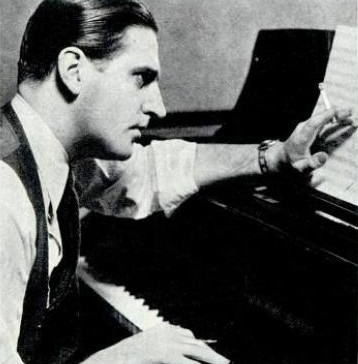
Willson in 1937

Willson's work in many films included the score for Charlie Chaplin's The Great Dictator (1940) (Academy Award nomination for Best Original Score), and arranging music for the score of William Wyler's The Little Foxes (1941) (Academy Award nomination for Best Music Score of a Dramatic Picture).

During World War II, Willson worked for the United States' Armed Forces Radio Service. His work with the AFRS teamed him with George Burns, Gracie Allen, and Bill Goodwin. He worked with all three as the bandleader, and a regular character, on the Burns and Allen radio program. He played a shy man always trying to get advice on women. His character was ditzy as well, basically a male version of Allen's.

In 1942, Willson had his own program on NBC. Meredith Willson's Music was a summer replacement for Fibber McGee and Molly. Sparkle Time, which ran on CBS in 1946–47, was Willson's first full-season radio program.

Returning to network radio after World War II, Willson created the Talking People, a choral group that spoke in unison while delivering radio commercials. In 1950, he became the musical director for The Big Show, a 90-minute comedy-variety program hosted by actress Tallulah Bankhead and featuring some of the era's best-known entertainers. Willson became part of one of the show's very few running gags, beginning replies to Bankhead's comments or questions with "well, sir, Miss Bankhead". He wrote the song "May the Good Lord Bless and Keep You" for the show. Bankhead spoke the lyrics over the music at the end of each show. He also worked on Jack Benny's radio program, and hosted his own program in 1949. For a few years in the early 1950s, Willson was a regular panelist on the Goodson-Todman game show The Name's the Same; he recalled later that he did the show for the steady Goodson-Todman salary, which he was saving toward his Broadway musical project.

In 1950, Willson served as musical director for The California Story, California's centennial production at the Hollywood Bowl. The show's director, Vladimir Rosing, introduced Willson to writer Franklin Lacey, who proved instrumental in developing the storyline for a musical Willson had been working on, soon to become The Music Man. The California Story was followed by two more state centennial collaborations with Rosing: The Oregon Story in 1959 and The Kansas Story in 1961.

== Broadway ==
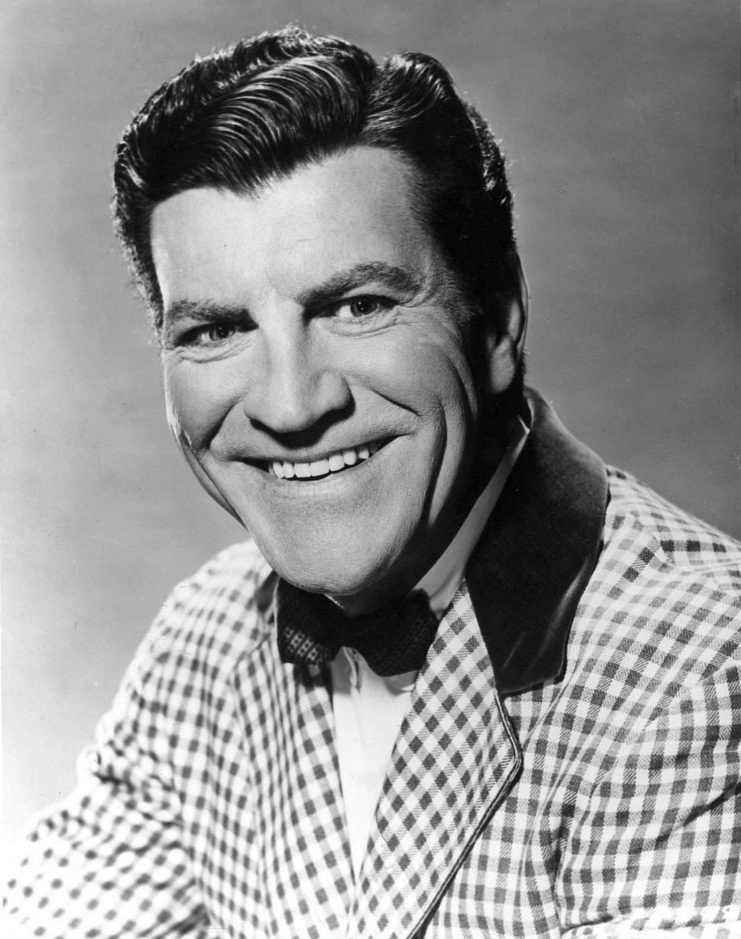
Robert Preston as The Music Man

Willson's most famous work, The Music Man, premiered on Broadway in 1957, and was adapted twice for film (in 1962 and 2003). He called it "an Iowan's attempt to pay tribute to his home state". It took Willson eight years and 30 revisions to complete the musical, for which he wrote more than 40 songs. The show, starring Robert Preston and Barbara Cook, was a resounding success, running on Broadway for 1,375 performances over three and a half years. The cast recording won the first Grammy Award for Best Original Cast Album (Broadway or TV). The show subsequently had a national tour and international productions. It was produced at New York City Center in 1980 with Dick Van Dyke in the title role and Meg Bussert as Marian. The first Broadway revival opened in 2000 at the Neil Simon Theatre with Craig Bierko as Harold Hill and Rebecca Luker as Marian. The production ran for 699 performances. A second Broadway revival premiered on February 10, 2022, at the Winter Garden Theatre, starring Hugh Jackman as Harold and Sutton Foster as Marian. In 1959, Willson and his second wife Ralina "Rini" Zarova recorded an album, ... and Then I Wrote The Music Man, in which they review the history of, and sing songs from, the show. In 2010, Brian d'Arcy James and Kelli O'Hara played Willson and Rini in an off-Broadway entertainment based on that album.

Willson's second musical, The Unsinkable Molly Brown, ran on Broadway for 532 performances from 1960 to 1962 and was made into a 1964 motion picture starring Debbie Reynolds. His third Broadway musical was an adaptation of the film Miracle on 34th Street, called Here's Love. Some theater buffs recall it as a quick failure, but it actually enjoyed an eight-month run on Broadway in 1963–64 (334 performances). His fourth, last, and least successful musical was 1491, which told the story of Columbus's attempts to finance his famous voyage. It was produced by the Los Angeles Civic Light Opera in 1969, but not on Broadway.

== Other works ==
=== Classical music ===
Willson's Symphony No. 1 in F minor: A Symphony of San Francisco and his Symphony No. 2 in E minor: Missions of California were recorded in 1999 by William T. Stromberg conducting the Moscow State Symphony Orchestra. Other symphonic works include the O.O. McIntyre Suite, Symphonic Variations on an American Theme and Anthem, the symphonic poem Jervis Bay, and Ask Not, which incorporates quotations from John F. Kennedy's inaugural address. In tribute to the Idyllwild School of Music and the Arts (ISOMATA), Willson composed In Idyllwild for orchestra, choir, vocal solo and Alphorn. Willson's chamber music includes A Suite for Flute.

=== Television specials ===
In 1958, Willson appeared on the televised panel game show I've Got a Secret. His secret was that he "wrote the new Salvation Army theme song." Willson wrote the song, "With Banners and Bonnets They Come", especially for The Salvation Army. The song was a direct reference to The Salvation Army's use of uniforms, flags, and symbols to "love the unloved". In the television special, Willson conducted the New York Staff Band while a Salvation Army officer, Olaf Lundgren, sang the song.

In 1964, Willson produced three original summer variety specials for CBS under the title Texaco Star Parade. The first premiered on June 5, 1964, and starred Willson and his wife Rini. It featured guest stars Caterina Valente and Sergio Franchi, and a production number with Willson leading four military bands composed of 500 California high school band members. The second special starred Debbie Reynolds singing songs she sang in the 1964 movie version of Willson's Broadway musical The Unsinkable Molly Brown. On July 28, Willson and Rini hosted the third special, which featured a Willson production number with 1,000 Marine Corps volunteers from Camp Pendelton. Guest stars were Vikki Carr, Jack Jones, Frederick Hemke, and Joe and Eddie.

=== Popular songs ===
Willson wrote a number of well-known songs, such as "You and I", a No. 1 hit for Glenn Miller in 1941 on the Billboard charts. It was also recorded by Bing Crosby, and by Tommy Dorsey with Frank Sinatra on vocals.

Three songs from The Music Man have become American standards: "Seventy-Six Trombones", "Gary, Indiana", and "Till There Was You", originally titled "Till I Met You" (1950).

Other popular songs by Willson include "It's Beginning to Look a Lot Like Christmas" (published as "It's Beginning to Look Like Christmas"), "May the Good Lord Bless and Keep You", and "I See the Moon". He wrote the University of Iowa's fight song, "Iowa Fight Song", as well as Iowa State University's "For I for S Forever". He also wrote the fight song for his hometown high school "Mason City, Go!"

An oddity in Willson's body of work is "Chicken Fat", written in 1962. In school gymnasiums across the nation, this was the theme song for President John F. Kennedy's youth fitness program. It was time to get the country's youth into shape, and Willson's song had youngsters moving through basic exercises at a frenetic pace: push-ups, sit-ups, jumping jacks, torso twists, running in place, pogo springs, and plenty of marching. With an energetic lead vocal by Robert Preston, orchestral marching band, and full chorus, it was recorded during sessions for The Music Man film. Two versions of the song exist: a three-minute, radio-friendly length, and a longer, six-minute version for use in the gymnasium. In 2014, a re-recording of "Chicken Fat" was used in a television commercial for the iPhone 5S.

In 1974, Willson offered another marching song, "Whip Inflation Now", to the Ford Administration.

=== Autobiography ===
Willson wrote three memoirs: And There I Stood with My Piccolo (1948), Eggs I Have Laid (1955), and But He Doesn't Know the Territory (1959).

== Personal life ==
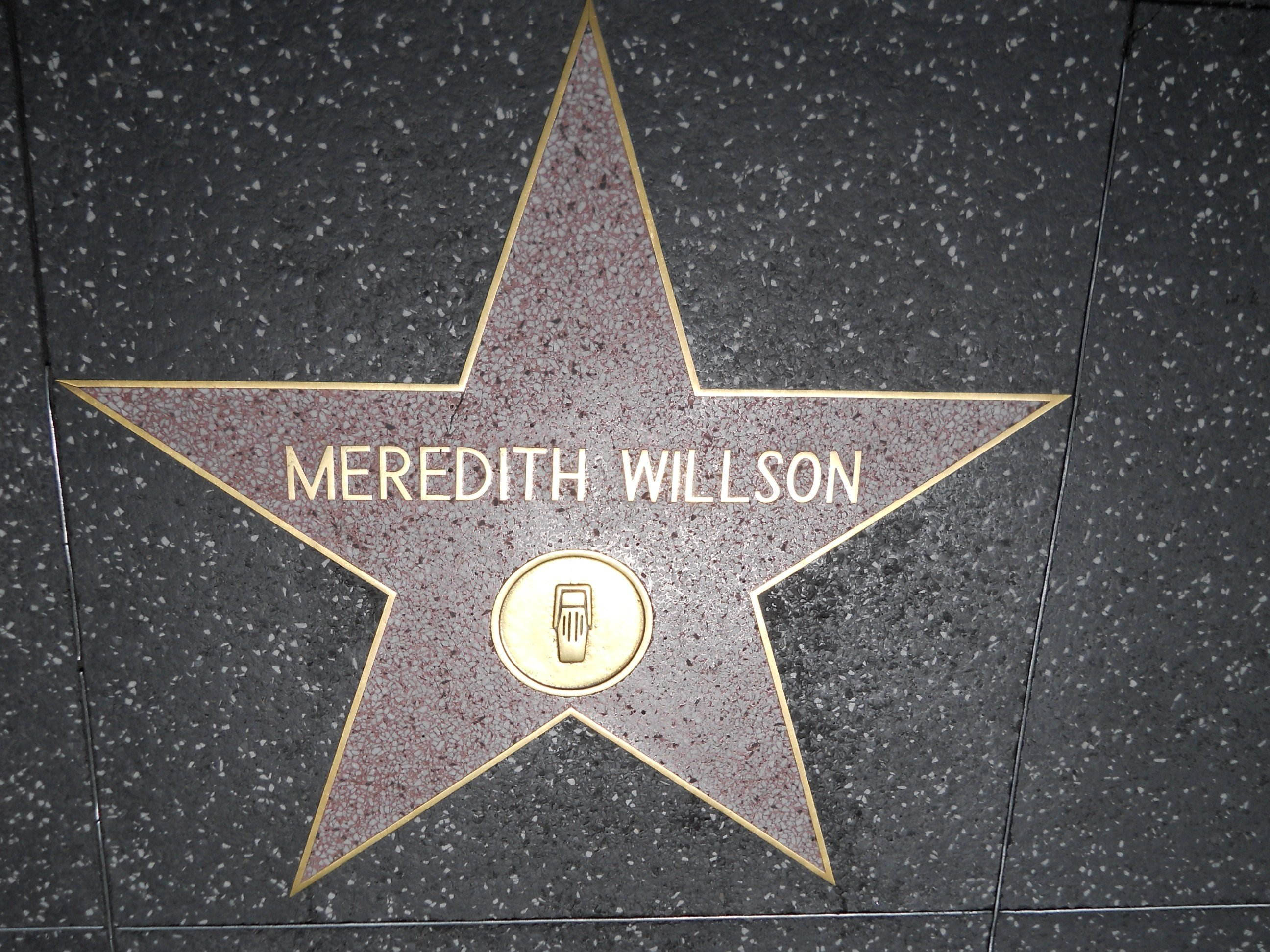
Star on the Hollywood Walk of Fame at 6411 Hollywood Boulevard

Willson was married three times and had no children. He was divorced by his first wife, Elizabeth, as reported in a news dispatch of March 5, 1947. They apparently had no contact after the divorce, and in his three memoirs Elizabeth is never mentioned, although he surprised her by sending her roses on August 20, 1970, which would have been their 50th wedding anniversary.

Willson married Ralina "Rini" Zarova, a Russian opera singer, on March 13, 1948. She died on December 6, 1966. He married Rosemary Sullivan in February 1968. For years he lived in the Mandeville Canyon section of Brentwood, California; Willson was fondly remembered by friends and neighbors as a warm and gregarious host who loved nothing more than to play the piano and sing at parties. He often gave guests autographed copies of his album Meredith Willson Sings Songs from The Music Man.

Willson returned several times to his hometown for the North Iowa Band Festival, an annual event celebrating music with a special emphasis on marching bands. Mason City was the site of the 1962 premiere of the motion picture The Music Man, hosted by Iowa Governor Norman Erbe, which was timed to coincide with the festival. Like his character Harold Hill, Willson led the "Big Parade" through the town, and the event included special appearances by the stars of the film, Robert Preston and Shirley Jones. The Master of Ceremonies, Mason City Globe-Gazette editor W. Earl Hall, was a statewide radio personality and personal friend of many decades.

Willson was a member of the National Honorary Band Fraternity, Kappa Kappa Psi.

In 1984, Willson died of heart failure at the age of 82. His funeral was held in Mason City, Iowa and included mourners dressed in Music Man costumes and a barbershop quartet that sang "Lida Rose". Willson is buried at the Elmwood-St. Joseph Municipal Cemetery in Mason City.

== Legacy ==
- On June 23, 1987, Willson posthumously received the Presidential Medal of Freedom from President Ronald Reagan.
- In 1999, the United States Postal Service issued a postage stamp featuring Willson.
- Willson's boyhood home in Mason City, Iowa, is part of "The Music Man Square", which opened in 2002. His widow, Rosemary, was a donor to the square.
- His alma mater, the Juilliard School, dedicated its first and only residence hall to Willson in 2005.
- "Till There Was You" from The Music Man was a favorite of the Beatles, and their recording of it was issued on their second UK and US albums With the Beatles and Meet the Beatles!. They performed the song during their first appearance on The Ed Sullivan Show in 1964.
- Willson's papers can be found at the Great American Songbook Foundation.
- Paul McCartney controls the publishing rights to Meredith Wilson's compositions through his publishing company MPL Communications.
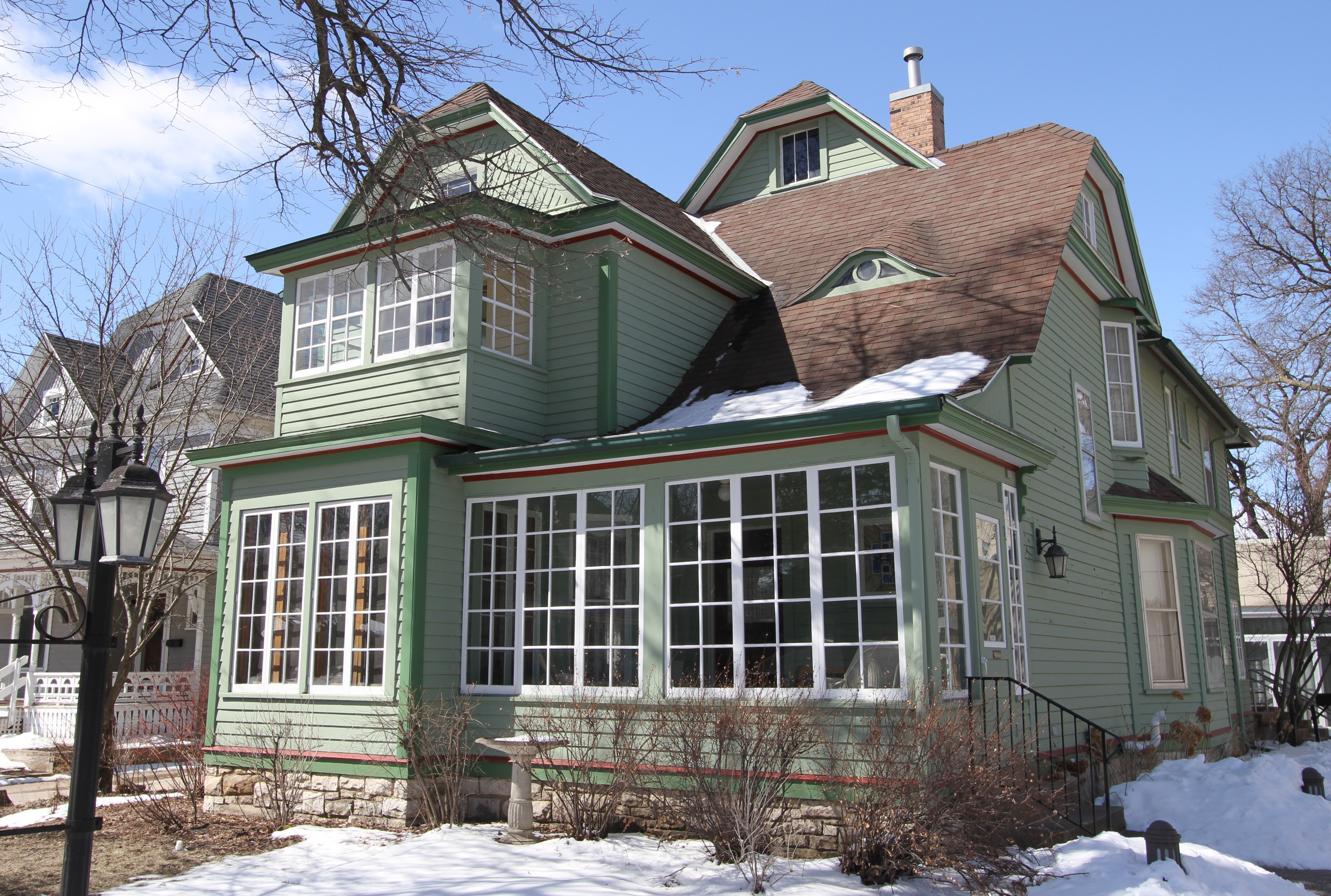
Meredith Willson's boyhood home

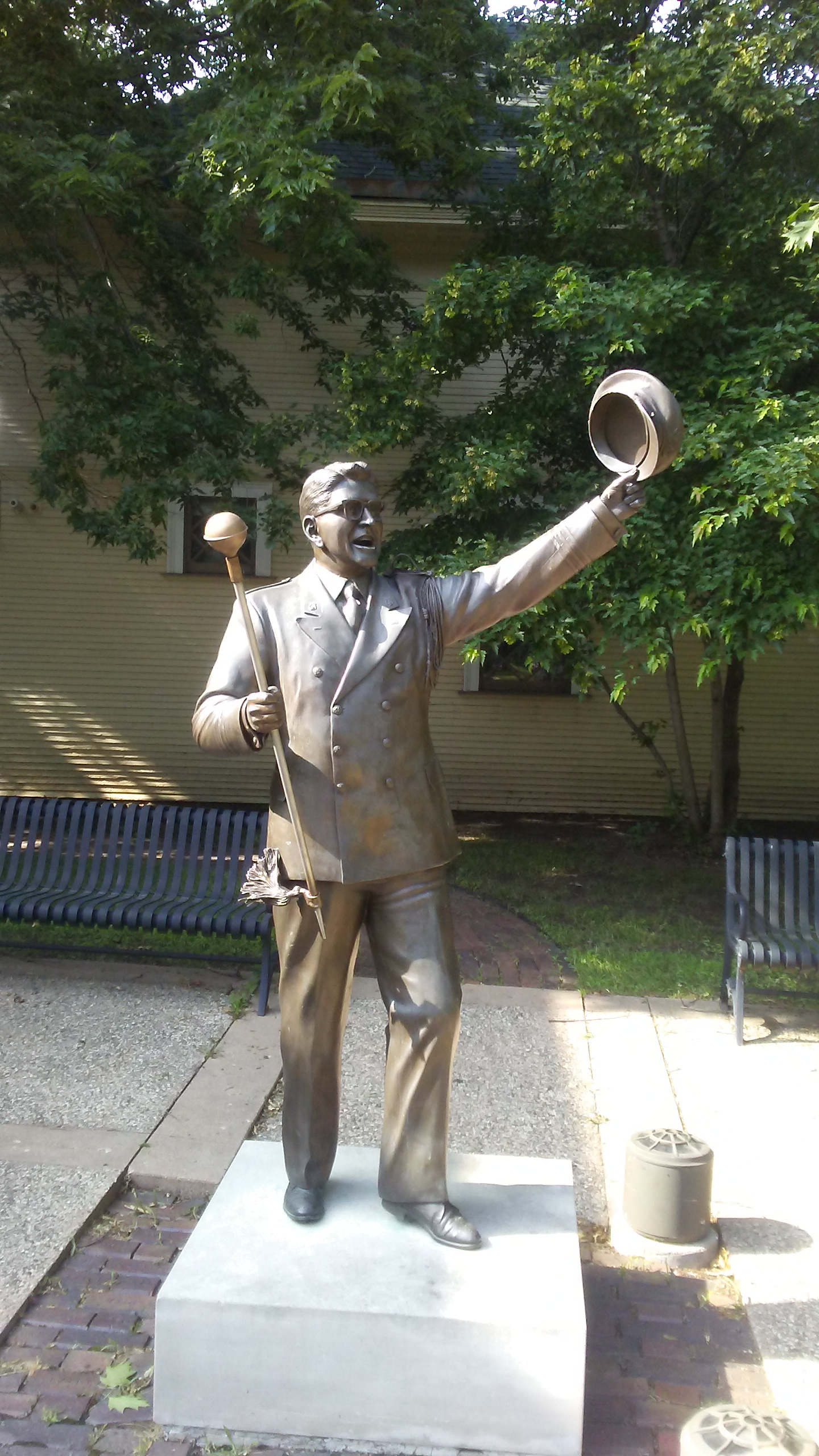
Statue of Willson at Music Man Square

== Books ==
- Willson, Meredith (1948, 2009). And There I Stood with My Piccolo. Minneapolis. University of Minnesota Press;.
- Willson, Meredith (1955). Eggs I Have Laid. Holt.
- Willson, Meredith (1959, 2009). But He Doesn't Know the Territory. Minneapolis. University of Minnesota Press;. Chronicles the making of The Music Man.
