= Ken Howard =

American actor (1944–2016)

- Howard in 1974

1st National President of the SAG-AFTRA
- In office March 30, 2012 – March 23, 2016 Serving with Roberta Reardon (2012–2013)
- Preceded by: Office established
- Succeeded by: Gabrielle Carteris

President of the Screen Actors Guild
- In office September 24, 2009 – March 30, 2012
- Preceded by: Alan Rosenberg
- Succeeded by: Office abolished

Personal details
- Born: Kenneth Joseph Howard Jr. March 28, 1944 El Centro, California, U.S.
- Died: March 23, 2016 (aged 71) Valencia, California, U.S.
- Spouses: Louise Sorel (m. 1973; div. 1975) Margo Lederer (m. 1977; div. 1991) Linda Fetters (m. 1992)
- Education: Amherst College (BA); Yale University; Kent State University (MFA)
- Occupation: Actor; comedian; politician
- Awards: Tony Award for Best Featured Actor in a Play; 1970: Child's Play; Daytime Emmy Award for Outstanding Performer in Children's Programming; 1981: The Body Human; Primetime Emmy Award for Outstanding Supporting Actor in a Miniseries or a Movie; 2009: Grey Gardens

Kenneth Joseph Howard Jr. (March 28, 1944 – March 23, 2016) was an American actor. He was known for his roles as Thomas Jefferson in 1776 (1972) and as high school basketball coach and former Chicago Bulls player Ken Reeves in the television show The White Shadow (1978–1981). Howard won the Tony Award for Best Featured Actor in a Play in 1970 for his performance in Child's Play, and won the Primetime Emmy Award for Outstanding Supporting Actor in a Miniseries or a Movie for his work in Grey Gardens (2009).

Howard had co-starring roles in the films Tell Me That You Love Me, Junie Moon (1970), Such Good Friends (1971), and The Strange Vengeance of Rosalie (1972). In the 1980s, he worked mostly in television, winning a Daytime Emmy Award for the CBS afternoon special The Body Human: Facts for Boys (1980). He later appeared in numerous character parts in films such as Clear and Present Danger (1994), The Net (1995), Michael Clayton (2007), and The Judge (2014).

In September 2009, Howard was elected president of the Screen Actors Guild (SAG), the actors' union. He was reelected to a second term in September 2011. He was the last president of the Screen Actors Guild and the first president of the newly combined SAG-AFTRA union, after the Screen Actors Guild and the American Federation of Television and Radio Artists (AFTRA) voted to merge in 2012. He was reelected to head the new organization in 2015.

== Early life ==
Howard was born on March 28, 1944, in El Centro, California, the son of Martha Carey (née McDonald) and Kenneth Joseph Howard, a stockbroker, being the elder of their two sons. His younger brother, the late Don Howard, was also an actor and director. His roughly 6-foot, 6-inch (1.98 m) stature earned him the nickname "Stork" as a high school student. He grew up in Manhasset, New York, on Long Island.

The nickname "the White Shadow" was given to him by the Long Island press in 1961, as at age 17, Howard was the only white starter on the Manhasset High School varsity basketball team.

A member of the National Honor Society in high school, Howard turned down several offers of basketball scholarships in favor of a more focused academic education. He graduated in 1966 from Amherst College, where he served as captain of the basketball team. He was also a member of the a cappella singing group the Zumbyes. He attended the Yale School of Drama, but left to make his Broadway debut before completing his master's degree, which he achieved in 1999.

== Theater ==
Howard began his career on Broadway in December 1968 in Promises, Promises, with Jerry Orbach, and shortly thereafter was cast as Thomas Jefferson in 1776, which opened in March 16, 1969. In 1970, he won a Tony Award as Best Supporting or Featured Actor (Dramatic) for Child's Play. Howard reprised the role of Thomas Jefferson in the 1972 film. His other Broadway appearances included Seesaw in 1973 and The Norman Conquests. Howard portrayed several U.S. presidents in the 1975 Broadway musical 1600 Pennsylvania Avenue and appeared as Warren G. Harding in Camping with Henry and Tom in 1995. He appeared in legitimate theater in many cities, most recently as Tip O'Neill in a one-man show According to Tip, at the New Repertory Theatre in Watertown, Massachusetts.

== Television ==
On television, Howard appeared as Ken Reeves, a Los Angeles high school basketball coach, in The White Shadow, produced by Bruce Paltrow in 1978. Howard had the starring role in the 1973 TV series Adam's Rib opposite his good friend (and Paltrow's wife) Blythe Danner, who also played wife Martha to his Thomas Jefferson in the film version of 1776. He starred in The Manhunter, a crime drama that was part of CBS's lineup for the 1974–75 television season.

Howard starred in the TV movie Father Damien in 1980 (in which he replaced David Janssen in the title role after Janssen died a few days after the movie started production) and won a Daytime Emmy Award in 1981 for his performance as the ideal father in the CBS afternoon special The Body Human: Facts for Boys. Howard's additional credits included Sidney Sheldon's Rage of Angels, 1983, the 2000 miniseries Perfect Murder, Perfect Town, and the feature film Dreamer: Inspired by a True Story, both co-starring Kris Kristofferson. He played the title character in the 1984 American Playhouse production of Mark Twain's Pudd'nhead Wilson, having earlier played Twain on Bonanza. Later, he appeared as Garrett Boydston in Dynasty and its spin-off The Colbys. In the late 1980s, he appeared on Murder, She Wrote, and from 2001–04 in Crossing Jordan as the title character's father. In 2007, he appeared in the Jimmy Smits series Cane.

Howard guest-starred on numerous television dramas. He was guest villain in Hart to Hart Returns, a 1993 made-for-TV movie. He also appeared in season one of The West Wing as a retiring U.S. Supreme Court justice unhappy with President Bartlet's choice for his judicial successor in the episode "The Short List". His other guest roles included NYPD Blue, The Practice, Boston Legal, Cold Case, Dirty Sexy Money, Eli Stone, Brothers and Sisters, Law & Order: Special Victims Unit, Curb Your Enthusiasm, Fairly Legal, Crossing Jordan, The Closer, Blue Bloods, The Golden Girls, The Office, 30 Rock, and George Lopez S5:E14".

== Film ==
Howard made his movie debut in 1970, in Tell Me That You Love Me, Junie Moon, opposite Liza Minnelli. Numerous dramatic and comedic movie roles followed, including: Otto Preminger's Such Good Friends with Dyan Cannon and Jennifer O'Neill, 1776, The Strange Vengeance of Rosalie, Independence, Second Thoughts, Oscar with Sylvester Stallone in 1991, Ulterior Motives, Clear and Present Danger with Harrison Ford in 1994, The Net with Sandra Bullock in 1995, Tactical Assault, Dreamer: Inspired by a True Story, and In Her Shoes in 2005.

In 2007, Howard appeared again with Stallone in Rambo, and in George Clooney's Michael Clayton. In 2010, he starred in The Numbers Game with Steven Bauer. He next appeared as Harlan F. Stone in Clint Eastwood's J. Edgar.

He gave an acclaimed performance as Phelan Beale in the 2009 HBO film Grey Gardens, playing opposite Jessica Lange, for which he received an Emmy Award. His last films were Better Living Through Chemistry (2013), A.C.O.D.(2013), The Judge (2014), The Wedding Ringer (2015), and the biographical comedy-drama film Joy (2015).

Ken Howard was elected the national president of the Screen Actors Guild on September 24, 2009.

== Author ==
Howard was the author of the 2003 book Act Natural: How to Speak to Any Audience, based on the drama courses he had taught at Harvard University. He was a popular reader for audiobooks.

== Personal life ==
Howard was married three times. His first wife was actress Louise Sorel (m. 1973–75). His second wife was writer and advice columnist Margo Lederer (m. 1977–91). His final marriage was to stuntwoman Linda Fetters Howard (m. 1992–2016).

In 2000, Howard underwent a kidney transplant; the donor was family friend Jeannie Epper, with whom Linda had worked in the stunt community.

=== Death ===
In 2007, Howard was diagnosed with stage four prostate cancer. In March 2016, he was hospitalized in Valencia, California, with shingles, where he died on March 23, five days before his 72nd birthday. He was the first, and as of 2026, the only Screen Actors Guild or SAG-AFTRA national president to die in office.

== Filmography ==
=== Film ===
Year	Title	Role	Notes
1970	Tell Me That You Love Me, Junie Moon	Arthur	
1971	Such Good Friends	Cal	
1972	The Strange Vengeance of Rosalie	Virgil	
1972	1776	Thomas Jefferson	
1976	Independence	Thomas Jefferson	Short film directed by John Huston.
1983	Second Thoughts	John Michael	
1991	Oscar	Kirkwood	
1993	Ulterior Motives	Malcolm Carter	
1994	Clear and Present Danger	Committee Chairman	
1995	The Net	Michael Bergstrom	
1998	Tactical Assault	General Horace White	
1999	At First Sight	Virgil's Father	
2004	Stuck	Marty	Short film directed by Clark Harris.
2004	Double Dare	Himself	Documentary film
2005	Dreamer	Bill Ford	
2005	In Her Shoes	Michael Feller	
2006	Arc	Santee	
2007	Michael Clayton	Don Jeffries	
2008	Rambo	Father Arthur Marsh	
2008	Under Still Waters	Conrad	
2008	Smother	Gene Cooper	
2009	Two:Thirteen	Sheriff Sedgewick	
2009	The Beacon	Officer Bobby Ford	
2010	A The Numbers Game	Harold	
2011	J. Edgar	Harlan F. Stone	
2012	A Fighting Man	George	Short film
2012	Just an American	Dr. Sullivan	
2013	A.C.O.D.	Gary	
2014	Better Living Through Chemistry	Walter Bishop	
2014	The Judge	Judge Warren	
2015	The Wedding Ringer	Ed Palmer	
2015	Joy	Mop Executive	Final Film Role

=== Television ===
Year	Title	Role	Notes
1969	N.Y.P.D.	Rick Crossfield	Episode: "Everybody Loved Him"
1972	Bonanza	Samuel Clemens	Episode: "The Twenty-Sixth Grave"
1972	Medical Center	Kevin Morgan	Episode: "The Outcast"
1973	Adam's Rib	Adam Bonner	Contract role
1974–75	The Manhunter	Dave Barrett	Contract role
1977	The Court Martial of George Custer	Prosecuting attorney	Made-for-TV movie
1978	Superdome	Dave Walecki	Made-for-TV movie
1978	The Critical List	Nels Freiberg	Made-for-TV movie
1978	A Real American Hero	Danny Boy Mitchell	Made-for-TV movie
1978–81	The White Shadow	Ken Reeves	Contract role
1980	Father Damien: The Leper Priest	Father Damien	Made-for-TV movie
1982	Victims	Joe Buckley	Made-for-TV movie
1982	The Country Girl	Bernie Dodd	Made-for-TV movie
1983	It's Not Easy	Jack Long	Contract role
1983	Rage of Angels	Adam Warner	Miniseries
1983	The Thorn Birds	Rainer Hartheim	Miniseries
1984	Glitter	Senator	Episode: "Pilot"
1984	He's Not Your Son	Michael Saunders	Made-for-TV
1984	American Playhouse	Pudd'nhead Wilson	Episode: "Pudd'nhead Wilson"
1984	Hotel	Bill Tillery	Episode: "Passages"
1985–86	Dynasty	Garrett Boydston	Recurring
1985–86	The Colbys	Garrett Boydston	Recurring
1985	Hotel	Malcolm Taylor	Episode: "Missing Pieces"
1986	Rage of Angels: The Story Continues	Adam J. Warner	Made-for-TV-Movie
1986	Dream Girl, U.S.A.	TV Host	Contract role
1988	American Playhouse	Sam Evans	Episode: "Strange Interlude"
1988	The Man in the Brown Suit	Gordon Race	Made-for-TV-Movie
1985–1989	Murder, She Wrote	Various Roles	6 episodes
1991	Deadly Nightmares	Dubois	Episode: "Homecoming"
1991	P.S. I Luv U	Jack Packer	Episode: "Pilot"
1991	Murder in New Hampshire	Bill Smart	Made-for-TV-Movie
1991	Memories of Midnight	Kirk Reynolds	Made-for-TV-Movie
1992	The Golden Girls	Jerry	Episode: "The Commitments"
1992	Mastergate	Courtleigh Bishop	Made-for-TV-Movie
	What Happened?	Host	Documentary
1993	Batman: The Animated Series	Hartness	Episode: "See No Evil"
1993	Hart to Hart Returns	Dr. Paul Menard	Made-for-TV-Movie
1994	One West Waikiki	Ronald Markham	Episode: "Til Death Do Us Part"
1994	Moment of Truth: To Walk Again	Ed Keating	Made-for-TV-Movie
1994	Captain Planet and the Planeteers	Voice	Episode: "A River Ran Through It"
1994–98	Melrose Place	Mr. George Andrews	Recurring
1995	Op Center	The President	Miniseries
1995	Her Hidden Truth	Jack Devereaux	Made-for-TV-Movie
1996	Diagnosis: Murder	Special Agent Dunleavy	Episode: "Murder Can Be Contagious"
1996	Arli$$	Rocky	Episode: "The Stuff That Dreams Are Made Of"
1996	The Client	Charlie Braxton	Episode: "Money Talks"
1997	Something Borrowed, Something Blue	Senator John Farrell	Made-for-TV-Movie
1997	Diagnosis: Murder	David Clarke	Episode: "Slam Dunk Dead"
1997	The Practice	Senator Frank Patanki	Episode: "Hide and Seek"
1999	The West Wing	Judge Peyton Cabot Harrison III	Episode: "The Short List"
1999	A Vow To Cherish	John Brighton	Made-for-TV-Movie
2000	The Practice	Defense Atty. Bradford	Episode: "Race Ipsa Loquitor"
2000	Perfect Murder, Perfect Town	Alex Hunter	Miniseries
2001–05	Crossing Jordan	Max Cavanaugh	Recurring
2001	Family Law	Reardon	Episode: "Film at Eleven"
2001	Arli$$	Coach Dreyfuss	Episode: "Of Cabbages and Kings"
2004	Curb Your Enthusiasm	Ken Abbot	Episodes: 2 episodes
2004	A Boyfriend for Christmas	Judge	Uncredited
2006	The Office	Ed Truck	Episode: "The Carpet"
2006	George Lopez	Dr. Woodson	Episode: "The Kidney Stays in the Picture"
2006	Ghost Whisperer	Judge Walter Merrick	Episode: "Fury"
2006	Huff	Walt Callahan	2 episodes
2006	Conviction	Judge Hanford	Episode: "The Wall"
2006	Law & Order: Special Victims Unit	Dr. Arlen Rieff	Episode: "Cage"
2007	Sacrifices of the Heart	Thane Weston	Made-for-TV-movie
2007	The Nine	Alvy Munson	Episode: "Man of the Year"
2007	Cane	Joe Samuels	Recurring
2008	Brothers & Sisters	Boyd Taylor	Episode: "Double Negative"
2008	Eli Stone	Thomas Hayes	Episode: "Grace"
2008	Boston Legal	Judge Walter Yardley	Episode: "Kill, Baby, Kill!"
2008	Dirty Sexy Money	Evan Connello	Episode: "The Summer House"
2009	Cold Case	Harry Kemp Jr. '58	Episode: "Libertyville"
2009	Grey Gardens	Phelan Beale	Television Movie, HBO
2011–13	30 Rock	Hank Hooper	Recurring – 9 episodes
2011	The Council of Dads	Burt Wells	Made-for-TV movie
2011	Fairly Legal	Charles Pease	Episode: "Pilot"
2011	The Closer	Wes Durant	Episode: "Star Turn"
2012	The Young and the Restless	George Summers	3 episodes
2012	Blue Bloods	Malcolm	Episode: "Nightmares"
2012	Counter Culture	Ken	Made-for-TV movie
2014	The McCarthys	Coach Colwell	Episode: "Pilot"

=== Theatre ===
Year	Title	Role	Theatre	Ref.
1968–72	Promises, Promises	Bartender Eddie; Karl Kubelik	The Shubert Theatre, Broadway	
1969–72	1776	Thomas Jefferson	46th Street Theatre; St. James Theatre; Majestic Theatre, Broadway	
1970	Child's Play	Paul Reese	Royale Theatre, Broadway	
1971	JFK	Designer	Circle in the Square	
1973	Seesaw	Jerry Ryan	Uris Theatre; Mark Hellinger Theatre	
1975	Little Black Sheep	Jack Hassler	Vivian Beaumont Theatre	
1975–76	The Norman Conquest Trilogy	Tom	Morosco Theatre	
1976	Equus	Performer	National Company	
1976	1600 Pennsylvania Avenue	The President	Mark Hellinger Theatre	
1988–90	Rumors	Glenn Cooper	Broadhurst Theatre; Ethel Barrymore Theatre	
1995	Camping with Henry and Tom	Warren G. Harding	Lucille Lortel Theatre	
1996	In the Moonlight Eddie	Director	Pasadena Playhouse	
2007	According to Tip	Tip O'Neil	New Repertory Theatre	
2010	Hopeless Romantic	Michael Hanley	Center Stage Theater, Santa Barbara	
2012	Golden Child	Assistant Director	Pershing Square Signature Center; The Alice Griffin Jewel Box Theatre	

== Awards and nominations ==
Year	Award	Category	Nominated work	Result	Ref.
1969	Theatre World Awards	—N/a	1776	Won	
1970	Tony Awards	Best Supporting or Featured Actor in a Play	Child's Play	Won	
1981	Daytime Emmy Awards	Outstanding Individual Achievement in Children's Programming – Performers	The Body Human (Episode: "Facts for Boys")	Won	
2009	Online Film & Television Association Awards	Best Supporting Actor in a Motion Picture or Miniseries	Grey Gardens	Nominated	
2009	Primetime Emmy Awards	Outstanding Supporting Actor in a Miniseries or a Movie	Grey Gardens	Won	
