= Burnt Offerings (film) =

1976 film by Dan Curtis

- U.S. film poster by Tom Jung
- Directed by: Dan Curtis
- Written by: Dan Curtis; William F. Nolan
- Based on: Burnt Offerings by Robert Marasco
- Produced by: Dan Curtis; Robert Singer
- Starring: Karen Black; Oliver Reed; Burgess Meredith; Eileen Heckart; Lee Montgomery; Dub Taylor; Bette Davis
- Cinematography: Jacques R. Marquette
- Edited by: Dennis Virkler
- Music by: Bob Cobert
- Production companies: Dan Curtis Productions; Produzioni Europee Associati
- Distributed by: United Artists (worldwide); Titanus (Italy)
- Release dates: May 25, 1976 (Italy); August 25, 1976 (United States)
- Running time: 116 minutes
- Countries: United States; Italy
- Language: English
- Budget: $2 million
- Box office: $1.56 million

Burnt Offerings (Italian: Ballata macabra, lit. 'Macabre ballad') is a 1976 supernatural horror film co-written and directed by Dan Curtis and starring Karen Black, Oliver Reed, Bette Davis, and Lee Montgomery, with Eileen Heckart, Burgess Meredith, and Anthony James in supporting roles. It is based on the 1973 novel by Robert Marasco. The plot follows a family which begins to interpersonally dissolve under supernatural forces in a large estate they have rented for the summer. The film's title derives from the Book of Leviticus, referring to a "sacrifice by fire" and a "gift offered to God."

The screenplay was adapted from Marasco's novel by Curtis and writer William F. Nolan, and the project marked Curtis's theatrical feature debut, as his prior work had consisted primarily of television films. Co-produced by Italian producer Alberto Grimaldi's Produzioni Europee Associati, Burnt Offerings was filmed on location at the historic Dunsmuir House in Oakland, California in the late summer of 1975. The shoot was marked by several difficulties, including a camera man being fired after improperly lighting two weeks' worth of material, as well as the production being temporarily halted when Curtis's daughter died by suicide. Davis also clashed with co-stars Black and Reed, deeming their actions on set as "unprofessional."

Distributed by United Artists, Burnt Offerings was given a limited theatrical release in the United States in August 1976, which expanded later that fall. While the film received mixed reviews from critics and was a box-office flop, it won several awards in 1977, including three Saturn Awards for Best Director (Curtis), Best Supporting Actress (Davis), and Best Horror Film. In the years since its release, the film has been analyzed by film scholars as a commentary on materialism and the dissolution of the American family.

== Plot ==
Writer Ben Rolf, his wife Marian, and their 12-year-old son Davey tour a large, shabby, remote neo-classical 19th-century mansion to rent for the summer. The home's eccentric owners, elderly siblings Arnold and Rosalyn Allardyce, offer them a bargain price of $900 (equivalent to $5,092 in 2025) for the entire summer, with one odd request: Their elderly mother will continue to live in her upstairs suite, and the Rolfs are to provide her with meals during their stay. The old woman is obsessed with privacy and will not interact with them, so meals are to be left in her sitting room outside her locked bedroom.

The family arrives at the house with Ben's elderly Aunt Elizabeth. Marian becomes obsessed with caring for the home, and wears the Victorian-era garments she finds in Mrs. Allardyce's suite, while distancing herself from her family. Of particular interest to her is Mrs. Allardyce's sitting room, which contains a massive collection of framed portraits of people from different eras, apparently former occupants of the house. Mrs. Allardyce's meals go mostly untouched, according to Marian. Various unusual circumstances occur during the summer; after Davey hurts himself playing, a dead plant starts to grow again; Ben cuts his hand on a champagne bottle, and a dead light bulb is mysteriously repaired; Ben is haunted by a vision of an eerie, malevolently-grinning hearse driver whom Ben first saw at his mother's funeral years earlier. With each accident that occurs, the house appears to rejuvenate itself, feeding on the family's energy.

Marian slowly becomes possessed by the energy of the house. Aunt Elizabeth suddenly becomes ill and dies, after which the dead flowers in the solarium bloom. When Marian does not attend Aunt Elizabeth's funeral, Ben angrily confronts her about her obsession with the home and decides to leave the next day. Ben later sees old shingles and siding falling away, replaced by new ones as the house restores itself. Now convinced that the house is a living entity, Ben attempts to escape with Davey but a tree blocks the road. He sees Marian as the chauffeur and falls catatonic.

The next day, while Davey is swimming and a catatonic Ben is watching him, the pool water turns into vicious waves, pulling the boy under. Marian rescues her son, and the incident awakens Ben from his catatonia. Marian agrees that it is time to leave but insists on going back inside to inform Mrs. Allardyce. When she fails to return, Ben goes inside to find her. He is horrified when he discovers that the elderly woman upstairs is his wife, who has inexplicably aged. "I've been waiting for you, Ben!" she says. Ben recoils in horror. Waiting in the car, Davey is shocked to see his father plummet from the attic window, landing on the car's windshield. In shock, Davey runs toward the house and is killed when one of the chimneys collapses on him.

Some time later, the Allardyces marvel at the restored beauty of their home and rejoice over the return of their "mother". In Mrs. Allardyce's sitting room, the photo collection now includes portraits of Ben, Davey, and Aunt Elizabeth.

== Cast ==
- Karen Black as Marian Rolf
- Oliver Reed as Ben Rolf
  - Todd Turquand as young Ben
- Lee Montgomery as Davey Rolf
- Bette Davis as Elizabeth Rolf
- Burgess Meredith as Arnold Allardyce
- Eileen Heckart as Roz Allardyce
- Dub Taylor as Walker
- Anthony James as the Chauffeur
- Jim Myers as Dr. Ross

== Production ==
=== Development ===
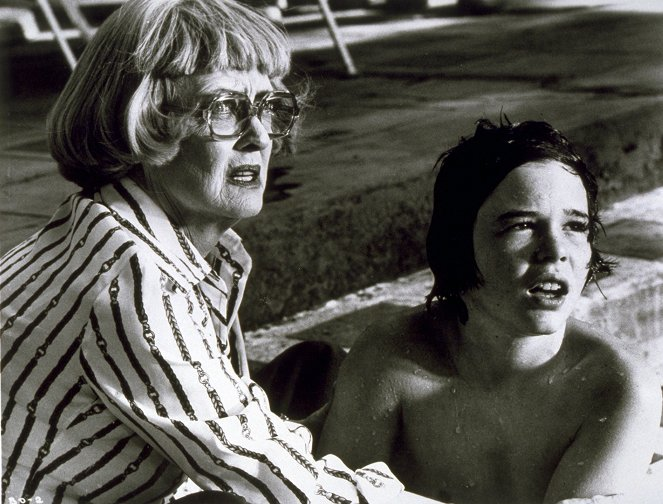
Bette Davis and Lee H. Montgomery in a promotional press photo

In a Variety piece published on December 11, 1969, it was announced a project named Burnt Offerings would be directed by Bob Fosse from a screenplay by Robert Marasco; Turman Films and Cinema Center Films would be producers and Lawrence Turman executive producer. Although it never materialized, a novel of the same name by Marasco was published in 1973. The American Film Institute inductively reasoned the book may have been written based on the un-produced screenplay. The title of the film and source novel derives from the Book of Leviticus, referring to a "sacrifice by fire" and a "gift offered to God."

Burnt Offerings was directed by Dan Curtis, best known for television horror works such as the TV series Dark Shadows (1966–1971) and made-for-TV films like The Night Stalker (1972). Although Curtis produced and directed many works for television, Burnt Offerings was the third of only four films he made for theatrical release (the others being House of Dark Shadows (1970), Night of Dark Shadows (1971), and Me and the Kid (1993)). When offered the project, he found the novel uninteresting, in particular what he called its "nothing" ending, and joked to himself, "I bet some idiot who doesn't know what he's doing will come along and make this." According to Curtis, three other directors had considered adapting the novel into a film, but ultimately declined as they believed the project would cost too much to produce. The film was executive-produced by Italian producer Alberto Grimaldi, who helped finance the project through his company Produzioni Europee Associati (PEA).

William F. Nolan dropped the first third of the book where the family was in New York City, and claims that the chauffeur character (Anthony James) was conceived by him and unique to the film. However, the chauffeur does appear in the Marasco novel; it is possible that Nolan is only referring to the driver's evil smile which he bears throughout the film. In a 2003 audio commentary track for the film's DVD release, director Curtis implies that footage was indeed shot showing the family in New York City, but it was his decision to excise it from the film.

=== Casting ===
The principal casting of Karen Black, Oliver Reed, Burgess Meredith, and Bette Davis was announced in July 1975. Director Dan Curtis offered Black the lead role while she was making Alfred Hitchcock's Family Plot (1976). Curtis had previously directed Black in the television horror film Trilogy of Terror (1975).

Curtis commented about offering Davis her role: "[Her] agent was difficult to deal with, so I called her in Connecticut. 'Is it a good part?' she asked. 'I don't disappear in a sneeze, do I?' I shot the script to her, and she loved it." Curtis also remarked favorably of Black: "Her instincts are close to infallible," adding that Reed "is the best actor I ever worked with in my life." Burnt Offerings marked Reed's first American-made film.

=== Filming ===
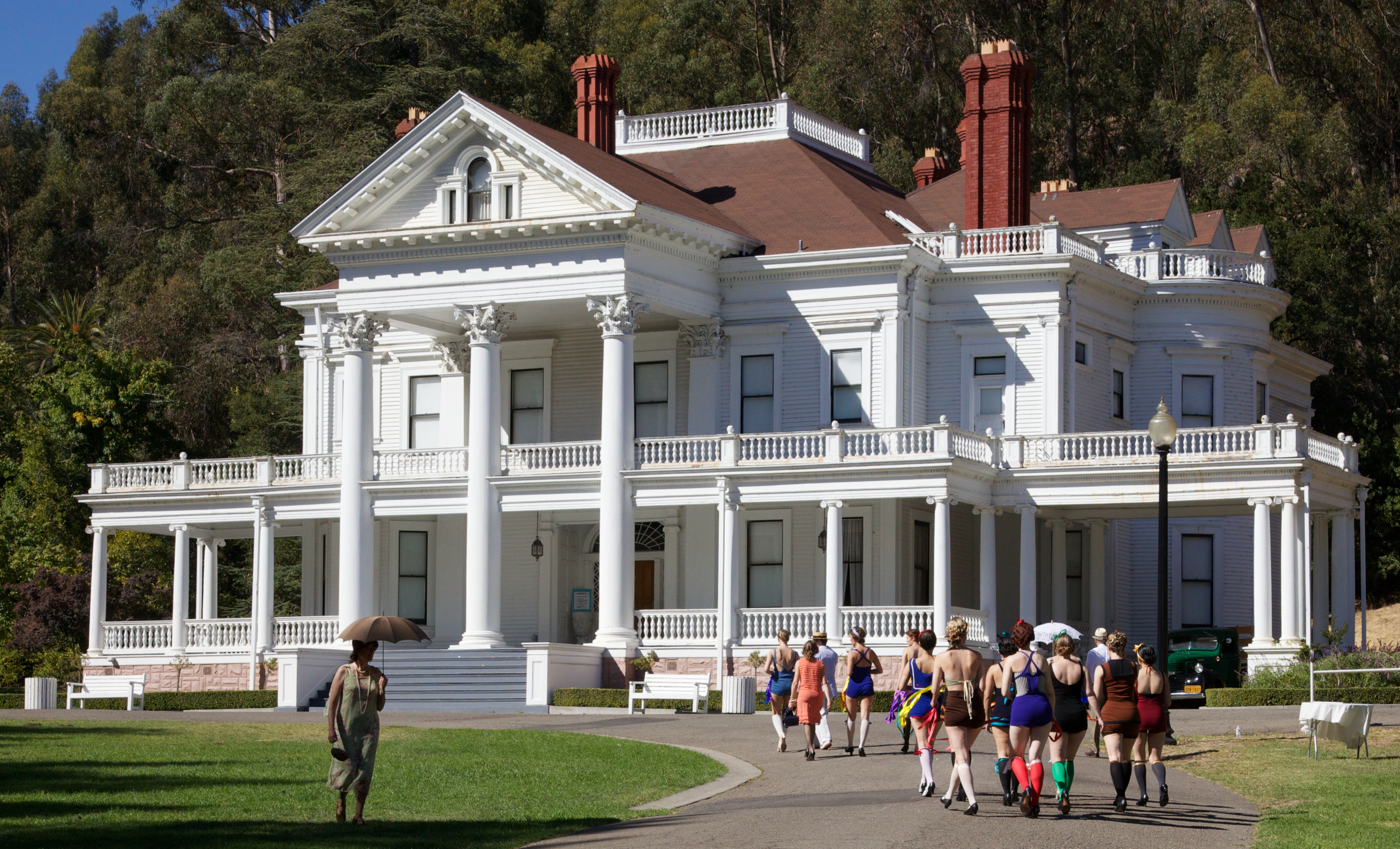
The film was shot at the Dunsmuir House in Oakland, California

Principal photography of Burnt Offerings began on August 3, 1975 at the historic Dunsmuir House in Oakland, California, on a budget of $2 million. The production leased the home and grounds, which are a public park, through September 13, 1975. Burnt Offerings was the first film to be shot at the Dunsmuir House, which appeared as a main location in the horror film Phantasm several years later. To prepare the home for the shoot, the film's art directors "turned the mansion and gardens into a seedy pile of neglected elegance," adding flaked paint and wisteria vines to some of the exteriors, and dressed the interiors with cobwebs and Victorian furnishings.

Bette Davis was vocal about her dissatisfaction with the shoot, describing it as "total chaos... I feel like I've spent the past six weeks in jail." Davis reportedly had conflicts with Karen Black, feeling that Black did not extend to her an appropriate degree of respect and that her behavior on the film set was unprofessional. Black was pregnant during the shoot, and was reported to have "frequently rested" between takes. In an interview with Rex Reed, Davis expressed disdain for the production, deeming it "unprofessional" and criticizing Black:

The director's daughter on this film committed suicide and we had to shut down a week. Then the camera man was fired because we couldn't see one thing on the screen, the rushes were so dark. That cost us two weeks of re-takes. Karen Black showed up six months pregnant, so they had to re-make her clothes because they didn't fit. She changes her makeup in the middle of a scene so nothing matches on the screen, she sleeps all day, never goes to rushes to see what she looks like and you can't hear one bloody thing she says on set.

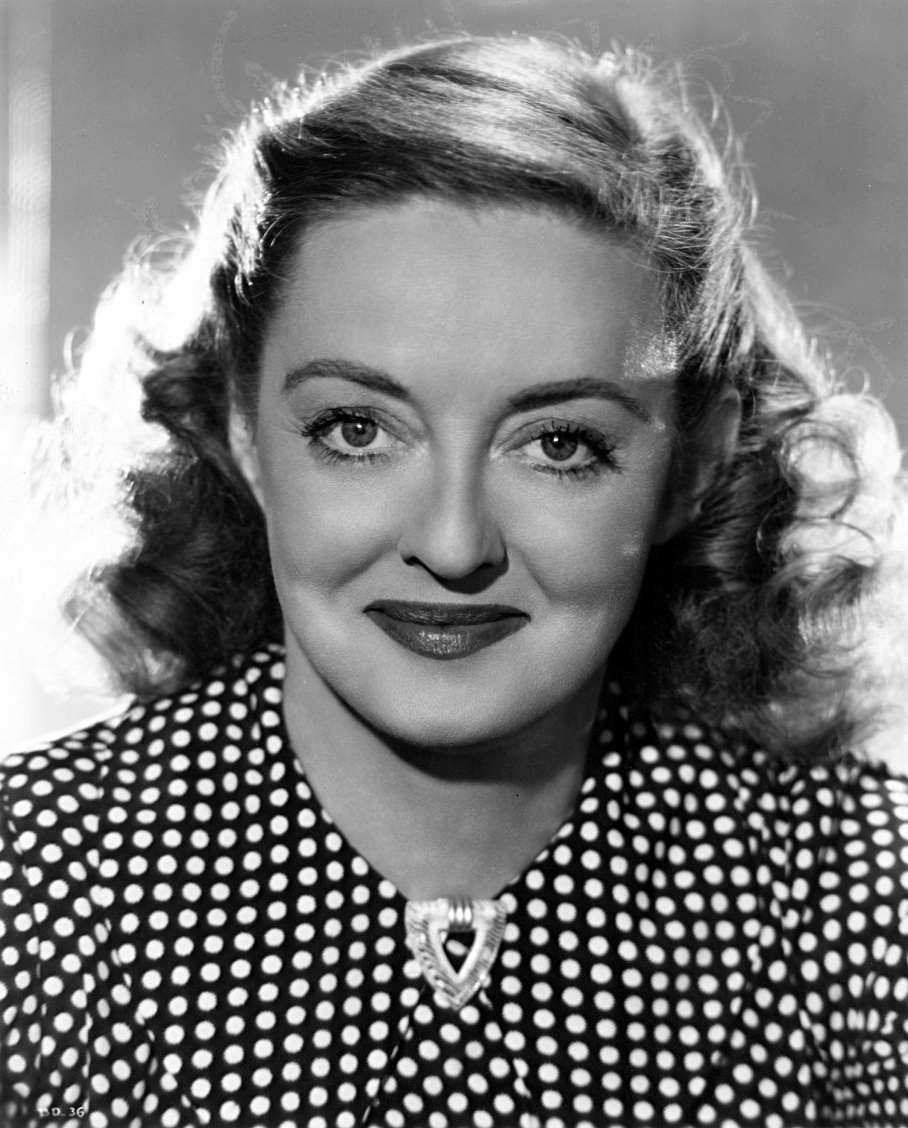
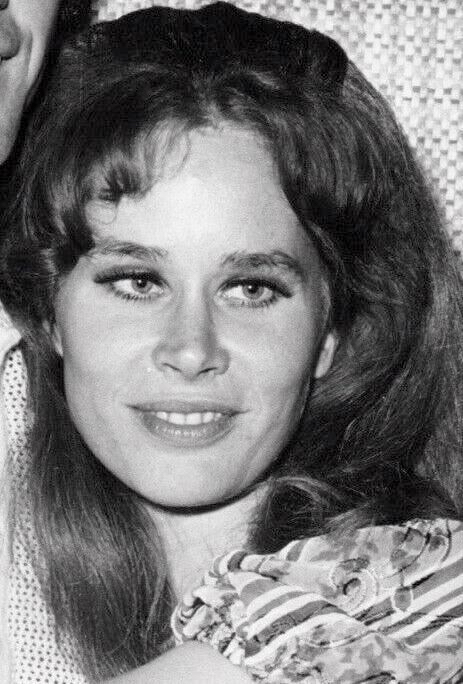
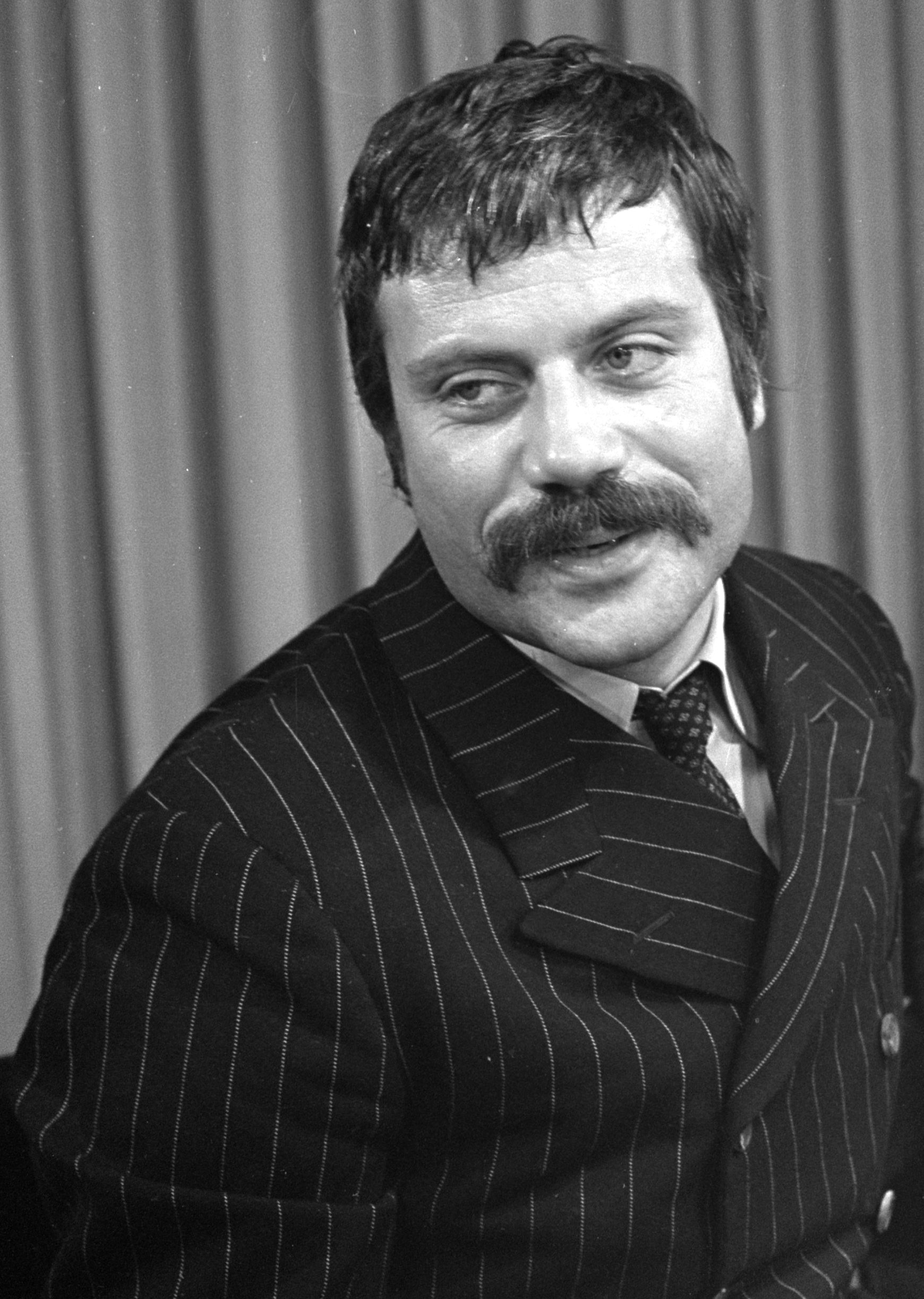
Bette Davis (left) clashed with co-stars Karen Black (center) and Oliver Reed (right) during the making of the film.

Davis also expressed dislike for Oliver Reed, whom she later referred to as "possibly one of the most loathsome human beings I have ever had the misfortune of meeting." Reed spoke favorably of Davis, however, commenting: "I was a little apprehensive about Bette... I don't think I'd like to cross her, but since we're both clever, we get along alright."

During the shoot, Reed admitted to riding Davis's dinner trolley down a hotel hallway "once or twice, knocking off a few plates. Miss Davis was insulted, supposing I was kicking her tray of expensive wine." As a peace offering, Reed later gifted Davis a dove and a bundle of red roses. Davis expressed further annoyance when Reed invited a group of stranded British Army men to stay at the hotel, and accused him of recurrently showing up to the set drunk.

=== Post-production ===
An Italian-language dub was produced by Società Attori Sincronizzatori, featuring the voices of Renzo Palmer, Riccardo Rossi, and Giuseppe Fortis.

== Release ==
Burnt Offerings was released in Italy on May 25, 1976, and received a limited theatrical release in the United States through United Artists on August 25, 1976, opening in Los Angeles and Buffalo, New York. It premiered in New York City the following month, on September 29, 1976. The release expanded on October 13, 1976, with the film ranking at number one at the United States box office this weekend.

=== Home media ===
MGM/UA Home Entertainment first released a VHS edition of Burnt Offerings in 1984, and reissued it in 1991. On August 26, 2003, MGM Home Entertainment released the film in region 1 DVD format. The DVD features an audio commentary with Dan Curtis, Karen Black, and William F. Nolan. The DVD was met with some criticism due to its video quality, which appeared to have been shot with soft focus, and the Dolby Digital mono audio that made the voices muddy and indistinct.

A North American Blu-ray edition of the film was released on October 6, 2015 by Kino Lorber. The Kino Lorber Blu-ray features a new audio commentary with film historian Richard Harland Smith, as well as the 2003 commentary track with Curtis, Black, and Nolan; additionally, the release contains newly-commissioned interviews with Nolan and actors Lee Montgomery and Anthony James, as well as promotional stills and the film's original theatrical trailer. This release was nominated for the Saturn Award for Best Classic Film DVD/Blu-ray Release at the 42nd Saturn Awards in 2016. After it went out of print, the Blu-ray was reissued by Kino Lorber on February 6, 2024.

In the United Kingdom, Arrow Films released a Blu-ray and DVD combination set on October 17, 2016.

== Reception ==
=== Box office ===
Burnt Offerings was regarded as a box-office flop, grossing $1.56 million at the box office against its $2 million budget.

=== Critical response ===
The New York Times declared the film an "outstanding terror movie... an excursion into eeriness led with admirable though not perfect assurance by the director, Dan Curtis." The Arizona Republic critic Mike Petryni was frightened by the film, particularly the smiling chauffeur, but felt it was ruined by an emphasis on constant thrills over subtle horror. He also was confused about several concepts, such as why Marian was depicted as frequently handling Roz Allardyce's trays. Ron Cowan of the Statesman Journal described the film as a "less than Grand Guignol venture" with a "stellar cast," concluding: "The house is a real charmer... especially when it sheds its shingles and siding and neatly disposes of troublesome people. By then, though, the movie's pace may have disposed of some of the audience." Ted Mahar of The Oregonian likened the film to The Innocents (1961) and praised its mood and suspense, as well as the "skillful" performance of Black, adding that Davis's portrayal is "aptly subdued."

While calling Burgess Meredith and Eileen Heckart the best performers in the film, Richard Dyer of The Boston Globe argued the material gave the actors little to work with; he called Black "particularly inconsistent", Reed "looking like an eggplant", and stated Davis "tries to create a Bette Davis character without any Bette Davis lines to work with, so all she can do is puff and snort a lot". Kevin Thomas of the Los Angeles Times similarly gave the film an unfavorable review, writing that it is "too trite, too drawn-out and repetitious, too poorly motivated and finally too vague in the nature of its supernatural evil to make it." George Anderson of the Pittsburgh Post-Gazette criticized the film as dependent on typical horror tropes such as shocks and loud music hits; he also described the tension as "a lot of sinister huffing and puffing to little effect", noting how most of the runtime is spent on mystery of which characters are the antagonists or protagonists.

Film critic Roger Ebert called the film "a mystery, all right", concluding "Burnt Offerings just persists, until it occurs to us that the characters are the only ones in the theater who don't know what's going to happen next." Variety stated "The horror is expressed through sudden murderous impulses felt by Black and Reed, a premise which might have been interesting if director Dan Curtis hadn't relied strictly on formula treatment."

=== Modern assessment ===
In the years after its release and following its regular television airings in the United States, the film became remembered by audiences for the appearances of its sinister chauffeur character, portrayed by Anthony James.

Donald Guarisco of Movie Guide called the film "worthy of rediscovery by the horror fans who missed it the first time", concluding "In the end, Burnt Offerings is probably a bit too methodical in its pacing for viewers accustomed to slam-bang approach of post-'70s horror fare but seasoned horror fans will find plenty to enjoy..." In addition to the slow build, Starburst's Robert Martin spotlighted its cast, particularly the chemistry between Reed and Lee Montgomery, Black's "loving and murderous" combination, and Davis' "uncomfortable" heart attack scene. However, he also felt the overall product was held back by its TV film look, particularly its "flat cinematography" and visuals that were more "clever" than scary.

In a retrospective on the film for its British Blu-ray release in 2016, David Hayles of Little White Lies declared it "An extremely effective and much-loved horror film in its own right" that is "worthy of a reappraisal."

On the review aggregator website Rotten Tomatoes, 50% of 16 critics' reviews are positive, with an average rating of 5.4/10.

=== Accolades ===
Institution	Year	Category	Nominee	Result	Ref.
Saturn Awards	1977	Best Horror Film		Won	
Saturn Awards	1977	Best Director	Dan Curtis	Won	
Saturn Awards	1977	Best Supporting Actress	Bette Davis	Won	
Saturn Awards	2016	Best Classic Film DVD/Blu-ray Release		Nominated	
Sitges Film Festival	1976	Best Director	Dan Curtis	Won	
Sitges Film Festival	1976	Best Actor	Burgess Meredith (Note: Shared with Burgess's performance in The Sentinel (1977).)	Won	
Sitges Film Festival	1976	Best Actress	Karen Black	Won	

== Themes and analysis ==
Burnt Offerings was part of a trend in 1970s horror films focused on the supernatural, such as The Omen (1976), Carrie (1976), Audrey Rose (1977), and The Amityville Horror (1979). It also was one of many horror films in the 1970s and early 1980s, such as The Texas Chain Saw Massacre (1974) and Poltergeist (1982), presenting the negative impacts of middle class life, such as empty-headed consumerism; in the film, the family is destroyed by a house they otherwise dreamed of, generic-looking, in the middle of nowhere, and meant for leisure. Writer Paul Meehan notes in his book The Haunted House on Film: An Historical Analysis (2019) that it is the first film to depict the psychological destruction of a family facilitated by supernatural forces in their home.

In the 1978 book An Introduction to American Movies, Steven C. Earley cited Ben Rolf's fall onto a car window as an example of the high presence of violence in films of the 1970s. Retrospective reviews viewed the story as a criticism on obsession on property ownership and the destruction of the nuclear family.

Literary critic John Kenneth Muir suggests that the film's depiction of Marian's supernaturally-driven obsession with the home and its physical state can be interpreted as a commentary on materialism, and the concern of physical matter over human and familial relationships.

== Soundtrack ==
Burnt Offerings

Soundtrack album by Robert Cobert
- Released: June 28, 2011
- Genre: Score
- Length: 1:05:22
- Label: Counterpoint

Like most other Dan Curtis works, the music for Burnt Offerings was composed and conducted by Bob Cobert. In 2011, years after the film's release, the original full soundtrack album was released by Counterpoint and was limited to only 3,000 copies. The album features all of Cobert's original score, plus alternate tracks not used in the film including two alternate "Music Box Themes". The CD booklet is 20 pages long and illustrated with photos taken from the set of the film during production. An original suite of the film's soundtrack can be found on the 2000 Robert Cobert collection album The Night Stalker and Other Classic Thrillers.

=== Track listing ===
All tracks are written by Robert Cobert.

No.	Title	Length
1.	"Foreboding Evil"	1:32
2.	"Memories of a Lifetime"	2:06
3.	"17 Shore Road"	2:08
4.	"Mrs. Allardyce's Room"	0:53
5.	"Music Box Theme"	2:50
6.	"Danger at the Pool"	2:53
7.	"Funeral Dream"	1:28
8.	"The Pool After Dark"	0:32
9.	"Rendezvous Gone Wrong"	2:10
10.	"Aunt Elizabeth Investigates"	2:06
11.	"The Chauffeur"	1:04
12.	"The Clocks Restart/The Gas Leaks"	0:50
13.	"Marian & Aunt Elizabeth's Quarrel"	2:06
14.	"Aunt Elizabeth Falls Ill"	4:42
15.	"Music Box Theme"	1:29
16.	"Terror Up the Stairs"	2:19
17.	"The Greenhouse"	0:26
18.	"Rejuvenation and Attempted Escape"	2:44
19.	"The Ride Back"	1:32
20.	"Swimming Pool"	4:52
21.	"Ben Confronts Terror"	1:43
22.	"The Final Horror"	1:29
23.	"A House Reborn/End Title"	3:08
24.	"Marian Rolfe"	0:32
25.	"House Eternal"	1:42
26.	"Family in Danger"	1:35
27.	"Main Title (Outtake)"	3:18
28.	"Music Box Theme (Piano Version 1)"	2:51
29.	"Alternate Music Box Theme #1 (Celesta Version)"	1:06
30.	"Alternate Music Box Theme #2 (Piano Version 2)"	2:21
31.	"Music Box Theme (shorter version)"	2:37
32.	"Main Title (Reprise-Outtake)"	0:45
Total length:		01:05:22

== Sources ==
- Chiavini, Roberto; Pizzi, Gian Filippo (1996). Dizionario dei Personaggi Fantastici (in Italian). Rome, Italy: Gremese. ISBN 978-8-877-42047-3.
- Curtis, Dan; Black, Karen; Nolan, William F. (August 26, 2003). Burnt Offerings (DVD audio commentary). MGM Home Entertainment. OCLC 52994710.
- Drebit, Scott (2024). A Cut Below: A Celebration of B Horror Movies, 1950s-1980s. Jefferson, North Carolina: McFarland & Company. ISBN 978-1-476-69195-4.
- Earley, Steven C. (1978). An Introduction to American Movies. New York City, New York: New American Library. ISBN 978-0-451-61638-8.
- King, Claire Sisco (April 2007). "Acting Out and Sounding Off: Sacrifice and Performativity in Alice, Sweet Alice" (PDF). Text and Performance Quarterly. 27 (2): 124–142. doi:10.1080/10462930701251199. S2CID 219640591.
- Malless, Stan; McQuain, Jeff (2003). Coined by God: Words and Phrases that First Appear in the English Translations of the Bible. New York City, New York: W. W. Norton & Company. ISBN 978-0-393-02045-8.
- Meehan, Paul (2019). The Haunted House on Film: An Historical Analysis. Jefferson, North Carolina: McFarland & Company. ISBN 978-1-476-63820-1.
- Muir, John Kenneth (2007). Horror Films of the 1970s. Jefferson, North Carolina: McFarland & Company. ISBN 978-0-786-43104-5.
- Nowell, Richard (2011). Blood Money: A History of the First Teen Slasher Film Cycle. New York City, New York: Continuum. ISBN 978-1-441-14316-7.
- Snyder, Stephen (Fall 1982). "Family Life and Leisure Culture in 'The Shining'". Film Criticism. 7 (1): 4–13. JSTOR 44018714.
- Spada, James (1993). More Than a Woman. London, England: Little, Brown and Company. ISBN 978-0-316-90880-1.
- Squire, Jason E. (2005). The Movie Business Book (Third ed.). New York City, New York: Simon & Schuster. ISBN 978-0-743-29340-2.
- Thompson, Jeff (2009). The Television Horrors of Dan Curtis: Dark Shadows, the Night Stalker and Other Productions, 1966–2006. Jefferson, North Carolina: McFarland & Company. ISBN 978-0-7864-5337-5.
