= So Fine (film) =

1981 film by Andrew Bergman

- Theatrical poster
- Directed by: Andrew Bergman
- Written by: Andrew Bergman
- Produced by: Mike Lobell
- Starring: Ryan O'Neal; Jack Warden; Mariangela Melato; Richard Kiel
- Cinematography: James A. Contner
- Edited by: Alan Heim
- Music by: Ennio Morricone
- Distributed by: Warner Bros. Pictures
- Release date: September 25, 1981
- Running time: 91 minutes
- Country: United States
- Language: English
- Budget: $12 million or $10 million
- Box office: $4.9 million

So Fine is a 1981 American sex comedy film written and directed by Andrew Bergman. The original music score was composed by Ennio Morricone. It was Bergman's first film as director.

== Plot ==
At fictitious Chippenango State College, Bobby Fine (Ryan O'Neal) is a professor of English, who learns during a meeting with Chair Lincoln of the English Department (Fred Gwynne) that he is a candidate for tenure. During the meeting, Fine impresses Lincoln by responding in kind to an obscure line from William Shakespeare's The Merchant of Venice. Another professor (David Rounds) is amazed, and Bobby explains that with his father in the dress business, he'd always liked the play.

Meanwhile, in New York City, Bobby's father, Jack (Jack Warden) walks into luxury retailer Bergdorf Goodman attempting to steal customers with an armload of his own company's dresses before he is chased out by the manager (Michael Lombard). Back at his office, Jack checks in with his staff, and it becomes clear that his company, Fine Fashions, has excess inventory, poor designs, and high debt. When a buyer for another company (Jessica James) visits the office, Jack reluctantly arranges a sexual liaison with her to secure a sale. Additionally, he receives a phone call summoning him to a meeting with the imposing Mr. Eddie (Richard Kiel), a powerful loan shark and gangster holding a note on a $150,000 loan taken out by Jack, which has grown to a $1,500,000 debt. During the meeting, Jack confesses he can't pay, and Eddie takes over the business and force Bobby to run it.

Eddie's henchmen (Tony Sirico and Michael LaGuardia) kidnap Bobby and bring him to Jack's house, informing the Fines to meet with Eddie at his club. There, Bobby is struck by the beauty of Eddie's wife, Lira (Mariangela Melato). Bobby and Lira are strongly attracted to each other, and after suddenly kissing, Lira informs Bobby that she is open to infidelity.

The following day, a montage rolls as Bobby visits with the employees at Fine Fashions, attempting to learn the business. During the montage, a satirical song from the Ennio Morricone score (Union Label) plays as the employees smoke marijuana and generally laze about in comic fashion. The employees agree that Bobby is a fool.

At the end of the day, Lira invites Bobby into her limousine. She takes Bobby back to Eddie's mansion, and tells him that her marriage to Eddie is a loveless one, arranged to repay her own father's debts, and seduces him. Eddie comes home early, agitated because his game of pinball was interrupted by tilting. Bobby hides, while Lira hurls his clothing into the fireplace and hides his shoes in a house plant. After Eddie goes to sleep, Bobby is forced to wear an outfit of Lira's when he leaves. Outside, while inspecting the pinball machine smashed earlier by Eddie, the snug women's jeans tear; desperate to cover his exposure, Bobby stuffs wadded up-plastic into the seat. When he returns to the office, he stumbles into a group of garment buyers who have just dismissed Jack's latest fashions. They mistake Bobby's makeshift outfit for a new design and make huge orders for the jeans, which are dubbed "So Fine." Following is a commercial for the titular jeans, featuring models dancing and flashing their buttocks to the camera, interspersed with shots of women wearing the jeans (with the buttocks individually exposed through clear plastic windows) and driving men to distraction.

Bobby and his father are preparing to repay Eddie the $1,500,000. Bobby has returned to his professorship at Chippenango State College, and Jack has a meeting with Eddie at his house. Before Jack arrives, however, Bobby's shoe (previously hidden in a plant) falls and strikes him in the head. Reading the sole ("Chippenango Campus Shoes"), Eddie realizes that it belongs to Bobby. Lira flees to find Bobby, and Eddie rushes after her. When Jack arrives, the maid (Angela Pietropinto) tells him the situation, and Jack joins the chase.

Lira finds Bobby, and they plan to flee the country, but first attend a campus performance of Giuseppe Verdi's opera, Otello. During the performance, the soprano performing Desdemona (Judith Cohen) is struck ill, and Lira (whose own operatic ambitions had been frustrated by marrying Eddie) steps into the role, performing magnificently. Eddie arrives and knocks out the tenor playing Otello and assumes the role. As he joins Lira, Eddie also sings, but the subtitles do not reflect the action of the play, but rather that Eddie is there to kill Lira and Bobby. Eddie and Lira struggle back and forth, until Jack arrives and swings down on sandbags, knocking out Eddie. Much like with the So Fine jeans, the audience mistakes the performance for a revision of Verdi's original and applauds.

Later, Bobby and Lira are being propelled down the canals of Venice by a gondolier, and Bobby is reading a personal annulment of Lira and Eddie's marriage signed by Pope John Paul II (a farcical "marrigisimus annulum") and the camera pans to a gelato cart vendor serving a group of children. As the vendor turns away, it is seen that she is wearing So Fine jeans, and as she walks away, the credits roll.

== Cast ==
- Ryan O'Neal – Bobby Fine
- Jack Warden – Jack Fine
- Mariangela Melato – Lira
- Richard Kiel – Eddie
- Fred Gwynne – Chairman Lincoln
- Mike Kellin – Sam Schlotzman
- David Rounds – Professor McCarthy

== Production ==
According to the film's producer, Michael Lobell, the idea for So Fine originated with himself, from his firsthand experience in the garment industry, first through his father, who manufactured dresses, and then through his own experience as a successful designer of clothing in the Mod style.

Lobell explained that he went to Bergman with the story idea, which then led to Bergman penning the script. Bergman, for his part, told William Wolf, of New York, that after being taken on a tour of the Garment District, he was taken by the chaotic nature of the environment, and imagined how a college professor like himself (Bergman holds a PhD in American history) would have managed if forced into such hectic surroundings, and the plot developed from the juxtaposition of a crazed world with an ordered personality.

So Fine also received positive pre-release attention due to the main plot device, the transparent seats of the jeans (which in the film become a mass hysteria and take the nation by storm). Costume designer Santo Loquasto said he'd intentionally constructed the design as a sendup of those coming out of “Fashion Avenue,” the stretch of Seventh Avenue in Manhattan, New York City, which runs through the traditional Garment District. In one scene, an elaborate commercial for the jeans, choreographed by Grover Dale, plays out. Loquasto had designed a custom set, wildly illuminated and featuring dozens of models in the transparent jeans, arching towards the camera. Loquasto amusedly observed that despite he and the film-makers intentionally aiming to be outrageous, he was amazed to regularly return from the set and find television commercials he felt were even more so.

Wolf reporting in a piece published several months before So Fine’s release, visited the Filmways Studio and found the pairing of Richard Kiel and Mariangela Melato entertaining in a scene he viewed. Wolf's article highly praised Bergman, considering him (along with Albert Brooks, another active comedy film-maker of the 1980s) one of the few positive contributors to the comedy genre in film.

Bergman's previous writing credits were for Blazing Saddles (which Bergman initially sold to Warner Bros. Pictures as Tex X, a play on Malcolm X) and The In-Laws, neither of which Bergman had felt positively about, yet both of which were commercial and critical successes. In a New York interview, Bergman said that after his experiences with Blazing Saddles and The In-Laws, he was sure that So Fine was going to be a big hit, so he decided that he would direct the film, in order to be certain that what he thought of as a surefire screenplay would transition to the big screen with his vision intact. Pre-screenings were positive, but two weeks after the film's release (on September 25, 1981), Bergman was disappointed to see the film gone from the theaters. Bergman attributed the failure to the high-brow styling of his comedy being mismatched with its low-brow trappings.

O'Neal was cast at the suggestion of Warner Bros. His fee was a reported $2 million. Berman later said, "He’s a great physical comedian. First of all, Warner Brothers wasn’t going to let me do the picture unless we had a major star in it. Ryan was it. I mean, he’s not the logical person to play an English professor who’s Jewish. But I really wanted to make the picture, so I said, “Screw it.’’ Ryan is a great physical comedian—I think one of the great wasted talents. He’s extraordinarily funny."

== Critical reception ==
The film received mixed reviews from critics. Janet Maslin, then of The New York Times, complimented the casting, expressing that O’Neal and Melato might seem odd selections, but both ably filled their respective roles; Maslin also admired the scenes between O’Neal and Warden, finding that the two actors are "perfectly teamed." She did find female characterizations disappointing, contrasting the sexually predatory nature of the female characters with the score-keeping attitudes of the male protagonists.

However, Tom Shales of The Washington Post was summarily unimpressed by So Fine's satire, considering its main gimmick (the transparent jeans) topically ripe for satire, but ultimately wasted and imbecilic. Shales had particularly harsh words for the film's two leads, O'Neal and Melato for, respectively, a one-note acting style and a weathered, scrawny appearance.

Pauline Kael called it a "visual insult: crudely lighted and framed, and jumping out at you... There are potentially funny scenes, but Bergman doesn’t know how to give timing and polish to his own jokes. Stuck with frantic gags, O’Neal just revamps his tightmouthed professorial priss from What's Up, Doc? The film’s only freshness comes from the lovely, tiny Italian blonde Mariangela Melato... In her deep voice she garbles her English charmingly; she’s an erotic imp—she looks a bit like Harpo Marx, and she’s always flying, like Carole Lombard in a hurricane."

== Box office ==
So Fine was filmed on a budget of $9,800,000, and in its three weeks in theaters, grossed a total of $9,381,808, and was considered a financial loss.

Bergman later reflected, "The movie was a bomb, but I must say that, to this day, some of the funniest things I’ve ever done were in that movie. Jack Warden’s performance was hysterical. The opera sequence. The whole on-going thing between Warden and the buyers. For sheer, piss-in-the-pants funny, the movie has some of the best dialogue I've ever written."

== In culture ==
In 1996, Joanne Slokevage filed a patent for a “garment rear,” which described cut-out areas on the rear of various bottom garments (pants, shorts, dresses, etc.), which a closure-secured fabric flap would cover or uncover, as the wearer chose. The patent was eventually rejected in Federal Circuit Court as unregistrable. In Slokevage's patent filing, a non-patent citation is included referencing So Fine.

Prior to Slokevage's patent filing and publication, in a pre-release interview, Lobell said that neither he nor Bergman nor Warner Bros (the distributor of So Fine) had immediate intentions to manufacture the jeans from the film, he did note that between the producer, director and distributor, they collectively held a copyright on the design, and had consulted with manufacturers. However, there is no record of any dispute between the three parties and Slokevage with respect to patent D410689.

== See also ==
- Kinky Boots
