= Robert Preston (actor) =

American actor and singer (1918–1987)

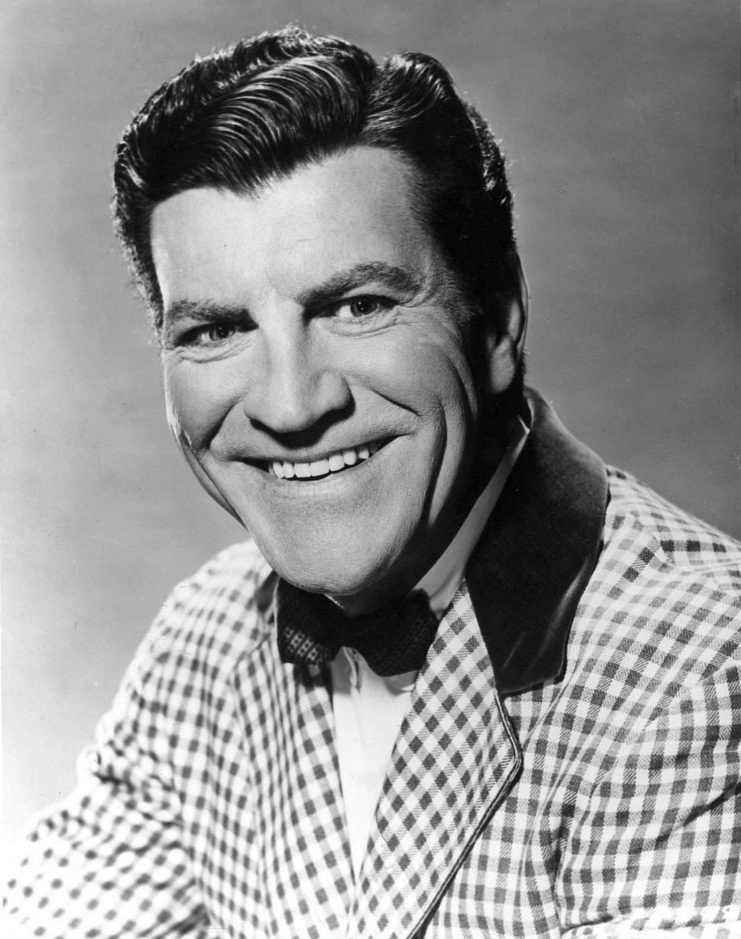
- Preston as The Music Man c.1958
- Born: Robert Preston Meservey; June 8, 1918; Newton, Massachusetts, U.S.
- Died: March 21, 1987 (aged 68); Montecito, California, U.S.
- Occupations: Actor, singer
- Years active: 1938–1987
- Spouse: Catherine Craig (m. 1940)
- Military career
- Allegiance: United States
- Branch: United States Army Air Forces
- Service years: 1942–1945
- Rank: Captain
- Units: 386th Bombardment Group
- Conflicts: World War II

Robert Preston Meservey (June 8, 1918 – March 21, 1987) was an American stage and screen actor, best known for his role as Professor Harold Hill in the 1957 musical The Music Man, for which he received the Tony Award for Best Actor in a Musical. He reprised the role in the 1962 film adaptation, and received a Golden Globe Award for Best Actor – Motion Picture Musical or Comedy nomination.

Preston made his Broadway debut in The Male Animal in 1952. He won two Tony Awards for Best Actor in a Musical for The Music Man (1957) and I Do! I Do! (1967) and was Tony-nominated for Mack and Mabel (1975). He co-starred alongside Steve McQueen in the Sam Peckinpah film Junior Bonner (1972). Preston collaborated twice with director Blake Edwards, first in S.O.B. (1981) and again in Victor/Victoria (1982), winning a National Society of Film Critics Award for Best Supporting Actor for his turn in the former, whilst earning him nominations for both a Golden Globe Award for Best Actor – Motion Picture Musical or Comedy and an Academy Award for Best Supporting Actor, as well as winning the National Board of Review Award for Best Supporting Actor, for the latter.

== Early life ==
Preston was born Robert Preston Meservey in Newton, Massachusetts, the son of Ruth L. (née Rea) and Frank Wesley Meservey, a garment worker and a billing clerk for American Express. His family moved to Los Angeles in his youth; he graduated from Abraham Lincoln High School in January 1935.

== Career ==
=== 1938–1942: Career beginnings ===
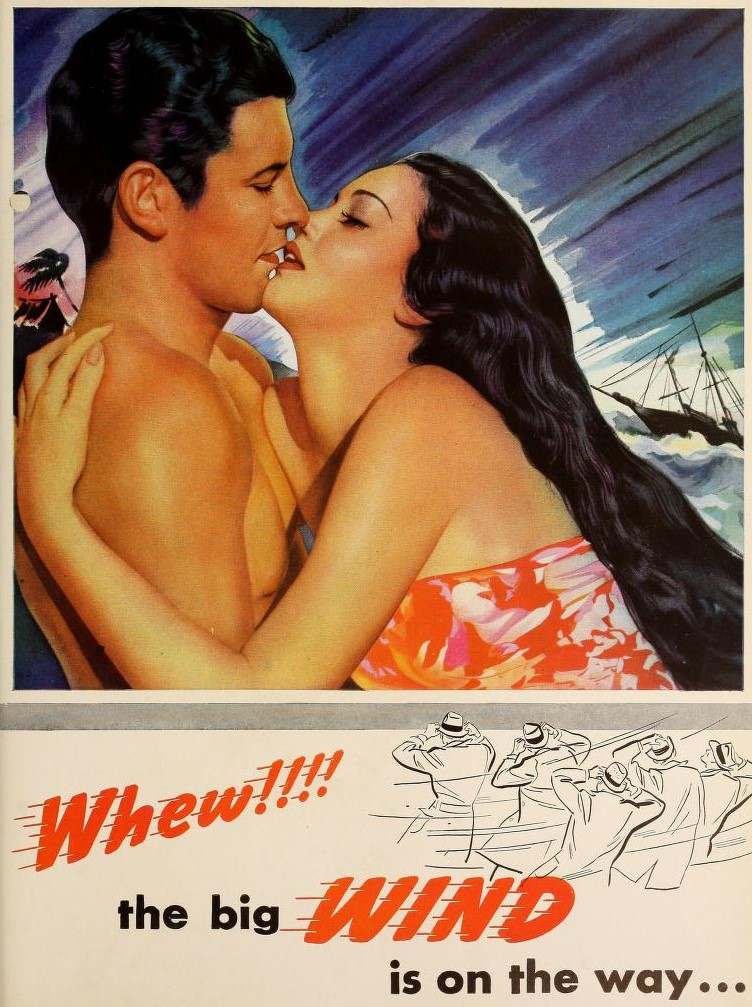
Advertisement for Typhoon (1940) featuring Preston and Dorothy Lamour

Preston appeared in a stock company production of Julius Caesar and a Pasadena Playhouse production of Idiot's Delight. A Paramount Pictures attorney liked his work and recruited him to the studio. The Los Angeles Times reported that Preston's mother was employed by Decca Records, Bing Crosby's label, and was acquainted with Crosby's brother Everett, a talent agent; she convinced him to watch one of Preston's performances at the Pasadena Playhouse. The result was a contract with the Crosby agency and a movie deal with Paramount Pictures, Crosby's studio. Preston made his screen debut in 1938, in the crime dramas King of Alcatraz (1938) and Illegal Traffic.

The studio ordered Preston to stop using his family name of Meservey. As Robert Preston, the name by which he was known for his entire professional career, he appeared in many Hollywood films, predominantly but not exclusively Westerns. He was Digby Geste in the sound remake of Beau Geste (1939) with Gary Cooper and Ray Milland, and Dick Allen in the Cecil B DeMille epic Union Pacific. Although not awarded until 2002 due to World War II, the film was the first winner of the Palme d'Or for 1939. He was featured in North West Mounted Police (1940), also with Cooper. He played a Los Angeles police detective in the noir This Gun for Hire (1942).

=== 1942–1945: Military service ===
World War II interrupted Preston's Paramount assignments. Following the Japanese attack on Pearl Harbor, he joined the United States Army Air Forces and served as an intelligence officer in the U.S. 9th Air Force with the 386th Bombardment Group (Medium). At the end of the war in Europe, the 386th and Captain Robert Meservey, an S-2 Officer (intelligence), were stationed in Sint-Truiden, Belgium. Meservey's job had been receiving intelligence reports from 9th Air Force headquarters and briefing the bomber crews on what to expect in accomplishing their missions.

=== 1947–1956: Return to acting ===
When Preston resumed his movie career in 1947, it was as a freelance character actor, accepting roles for Paramount, RKO, Metro-Goldwyn-Mayer, and various independent producers. Although Preston appeared in many films during this period, he never achieved major stardom. In an interview from 1984, he recalled, "I played the lead in all the 'B' pictures and the villain in all the epics. After a while, it was clear to me I had sort of reached what I was going to be in movies." During the 1950s, Preston found additional roles in television.

=== 1957–1979: The Music Man and acclaim ===
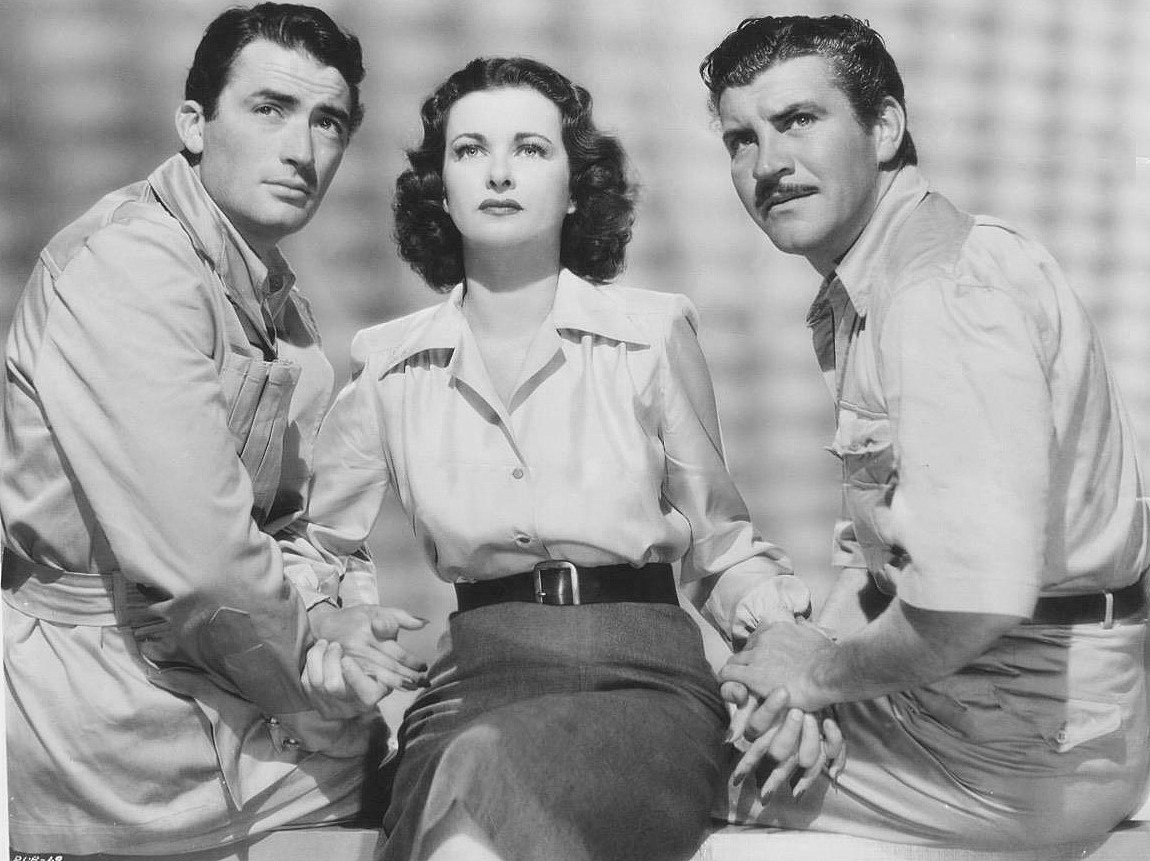
Gregory Peck, Joan Bennett and Preston in The Macomber Affair (1947)

Preston is probably best known for his performance as Professor Harold Hill in Meredith Willson's musical The Music Man (1957). He had appeared on stage, but it was his first musical. "They'd run through all the musical comedy people before they cast me", he remembered years later. He won a Tony Award for his performance.

He appeared on the cover of Time on July 21, 1958.

In 1961, Preston was asked to make a recording as part of a program by the President's Council on Physical Fitness to encourage schoolchildren to do more daily exercise. The song, Chicken Fat, composed by Meredith Willson and performed by Preston with full orchestral accompaniment, was recorded during sessions for The Music Man soundtrack. The recording was distributed by Capitol Records to elementary schools across the nation and played for students as they performed calisthenics.

In 1962, Preston starred opposite Shirley Jones in the film version of The Music Man, although, surprisingly, he was not the studio’s first choice despite his success on Broadway. Warner Bros. wanted to cast Frank Sinatra as the fast-talking Harold Hill, but playwright Willson insisted that Preston be cast.

He played an important supporting role as wagonmaster Roger Morgan, in the MGM epic How the West Was Won (1962).

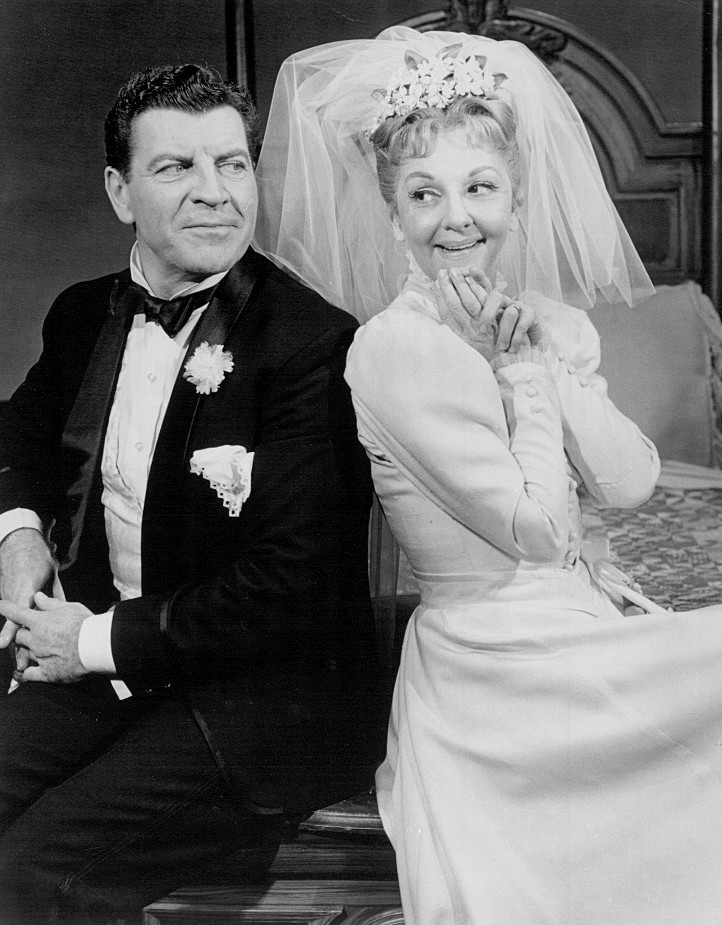
Preston and Mary Martin in the Broadway play I Do! I Do! (1966)

In 1966, Preston was the male half of the two-character musical I Do! I Do! with Mary Martin, for which he won his second Tony Award. In 1964 he starred in the title role in the musical Ben Franklin in Paris, and he originated the role of Henry II in the stage production of The Lion in Winter, whom Peter O'Toole portrayed in the film version, receiving an Academy Award nomination. In 1974, he starred alongside Bernadette Peters in Jerry Herman's Broadway musical Mack & Mabel as Mack Sennett, the famous silent film director. That same year, the film version of Mame, another Jerry Herman musical, was released with Preston starring, alongside Lucille Ball, in the role of Beauregard Burnside.

In 1978, Preston starred in another musical that did not make it to Broadway, The Prince of Grand Street, in which he played a matinee idol of New York's Yiddish theater who refused to renounce the roles he had played in his youth, despite having aged out of them. With a libretto and songs by Bob Merrill and direction by Gene Saks, the show folded during its Boston tryout. In 1979, Preston portrayed a snake-handling family patriarch Hadley Chisholm in a CBS Western miniseries, The Chisholms, with Rosemary Harris as his wife, Minerva. The story chronicled the Chisholm family losing their land in Virginia and migrating to the west to begin a new life. When CBS continued the saga as a weekly series the following year, Preston reprised his role, but his character died in the fifth episode. The series, which also featured co-stars Ben Murphy, Brett Cullen, and James Van Patten, lasted only four more episodes after Preston's departure.

=== Later career ===
Preston's other film roles during the 1970s included Ace Bonner in Sam Peckinpah's Junior Bonner (1972), Joseph Dobbs in the mystery Child's Play, directed by Sidney Lumet, and "Big Ed" Bookman in Semi-Tough (1977). He appeared in Blake Edwards' Hollywood satire, S.O.B. (1981) and Edwards' Victor/Victoria (1982), for which he was nominated for an Academy Award as Best Supporting Actor. His last role in a theatrical film was in The Last Starfighter (1984) as an interstellar military recruiter called "Centauri". Preston said that he based his approach to the character of Centauri on that which he had taken to Professor Harold Hill. Indeed, the role of Centauri was written for him with his performance as Harold Hill in mind. On television, Preston starred in the well-received CBS whodunit Rehearsal for Murder (1982), as a playwright attempting to solve the murder of his fiancée, a stage actress. He portrayed an aging gunfighter in September Gun (1983), a CBS TV Western film opposite Patty Duke and Christopher Lloyd. In 1985, he starred in another well-received TV movie Finnegan, Begin Again with Mary Tyler Moore and Sylvia Sidney, for HBO. Preston's final role was in the CBS TV film Outrage! (1986); he appeared as a grief-stricken father on trial for killing the man who brutally raped and murdered his daughter.

== Personal life and death ==
Preston married actress Catherine Craig in 1940. Preston was diagnosed with lung cancer in 1986; he died of the disease on March 21, 1987 in Montecito, California.

== Acting credits ==
=== Film ===
Year	Title	Role	Notes
1938	King of Alcatraz	Robert MacArthur	
1938	Illegal Traffic	Charles Bent Martin	
1939	Disbarred	Bradley Kent	
1939	Union Pacific	Dick Allen	
1939	Beau Geste	Digby Geste	
1940	Typhoon	Johnny Potter	
1940	North West Mounted Police	Ronnie Logan	
1940	Moon Over Burma	Chuck Lane	
1941	The Lady from Cheyenne	Steve Lewis	
1941	Parachute Battalion	Donald Morse	
1941	New York Town	Paul Bryson, Jr.	
1941	The Night of January 16th	Steve Van Ruyle	
1941	Pacific Blackout	Robert Draper	
1942	Star Spangled Rhythm	Himself	Uncredited
1942	Reap the Wild Wind	Dan Cutler	
1942	This Gun for Hire	Michael Crane	
1942	Wake Island	Pvt. Joe Doyle	
1943	Night Plane from Chungking	Capt. Nick Stanton	
1943	Wings Up		
1947	The Macomber Affair	Francis Macomber	
1947	Variety Girl	Himself	
1947	Wild Harvest	Jim Davis	
1948	Big City	Rev. Philip Y. Andrews	
1948	Blood on the Moon	Tate Riling	
1948	Whispering Smith	Murray Sinclair	
1949	Tulsa	Brad Brady	
1949	The Lady Gambles	David Boothe	
1950	The Sundowners	James Cloud ('Kid Wichita')	
1951	When I Grow Up	Father Reed	
1951	Cloudburst	John Graham	
1951	Best of the Badmen	Matthew Fowler	
1951	My Outlaw Brother	Joe Waldner	
1951	Face to Face	Sheriff Jack Potter	
1955	The Last Frontier	Col. Frank Marston	
1956	Sentinels in the Air	Narrator	Voice
1960	The Dark at the Top of the Stairs	Rubin Flood	
1962	The Music Man	Prof. Harold Hill	
1962	How the West Was Won	Roger Morgan	
1963	Island of Love	Steve Blair	
1963	All the Way Home	Jay Follett	
1972	Junior Bonner	Ace Bonner	
1972	Child's Play	Joseph Dobbs	
1974	Mame	Beauregard Jackson Pickett Burnside	
1977	Semi-Tough	Big Ed Bookman	
1981	S.O.B.	Dr. Irving Finegarten	
1982	Victor/Victoria	Carroll "Toddy" Todd	
1984	The Last Starfighter	Centauri	

=== Television ===
Year	Title	Role	Venue
1979–1980	The Chisholms	Hadley Chisholm	9 episodes
1982	Rehearsal for Murder	Alex Dennison	Television movie
1983	September Gun	Ben Sunday	Television movie
1985	Finnegan Begin Again	Mike Finnegan	Television movie
1986	Outrage!	Dennis Riordan	Television movie

=== Theatre ===
Year	Title	Role	Venue	Ref.
1951	Twentieth Century	Oscar Jaffe	Fulton Theater, Broadway	
1952–1953	The Male Animal	Joe Ferguson	City Center, Broadway	
1953	Men of Distinction	Peter Hogarth	48th Street Theatre, Broadway	
1954	His and Hers	Clem Scot	48th Street Theatre, Broadway	
1954	The Magic and the Loss	George Wilson	Booth Theatre, Broadway	
1955	The Tender Trap	Joe McCall	Longacre Theatre, Broadway	
1955	Janus	Gil	Plymouth Theatre, Broadway	
1957	The Hidden River	Jean Monnerie	Playhouse Theatre, Broadway	
1957–1961	The Music Man	Prof. Harold Hill	Majestic Theatre, Broadway	
1963	Too True to be Good	The Burglar	54th Street Theatre, Broadway	
1963–1964	Nobody Loves an Albatross	Nat Bentley	Lyceum Theatre, Broadway	
1964–1965	Ben Franklin in Paris	Benjamin Franklin	Lunt-Fontanne Theatre, Broadway	
1966	The Lion in Winter	Henry II	Ambassador Theatre, Broadway	
1966–1968	I Do! I Do!	He / Michael	46th Street Theatre, Broadway	
1974	Mack & Mabel	Mack Sennett	Majestic Theatre, Broadway	
1976–1978	Sly Fox	Foxwell Sly / The Judge	Broadhurst Theatre, Broadway	
1978	The Prince of Grand Street		Philadelphia / Boston	

=== Radio ===
Year	Program	Episode/source
1950	Lux Radio Theatre	Alexander's Ragtime Band

== Awards and nominations ==
Year	Association	Category	Project	Result	Ref.
Film and Television Awards
1962	Golden Globe Awards	Best Actor – Musical or Comedy	The Music Man	Nominated	
1981	National Society of Film Critics Awards	Best Supporting Actor	S.O.B.	Won	
1982	National Board of Review Awards	Best Supporting Actor	Victor/Victoria	Won	
1982	Academy Awards	Best Supporting Actor	Victor/Victoria	Nominated	
1982	New York Film Critics Circle Awards	Best Supporting Actor	Victor/Victoria	3rd Place	
1982	Golden Globe Awards	Best Actor – Musical or Comedy	Victor/Victoria	Nominated	
1984	Saturn Awards	Best Supporting Actor	The Last Starfighter	Nominated	
Theatre Awards
1958	Tony Awards	Best Actor in a Musical	The Music Man	Won	
1967	Tony Awards	Best Actor in a Musical	I Do! I Do!	Won	
1975	Tony Awards	Best Actor in a Musical	Mack & Mabel	Nominated	
