= Music Man =

Music Man may refer to:

- The Music Man, a 1957 Broadway musical play by Meredith Willson
  - The Music Man (original Broadway cast recording), an album containing the original Broadway cast recording of the above musical
  - The Music Man (album), a 1959 jazz album by Jimmy Guiffre featuring tunes from the above musical
  - The Music Man (1962 film), a feature film adaptation
  - The Music Man (2003 film), a television film remake
- "The Music Man" (song), a song and traditional game
- "Music Man", song on Take a Look Around by Masta Ace
- Music Man (album), a 1980 album by Waylon Jennings
- Music Man (company), a guitar company
- The Music Man, English name for the Iranian film Santouri
- Music Man (1948 film), a 1948 American film
- Sukshinder Shinda, British-Indian musician, nicknamed The Music Man
- Music Man, a character from Freddy Fazbear's Pizzeria Simulator
  - DJ Music Man, a character from Five Nights at Freddy's: Security Breach
