= The Music Man (original Broadway cast recording) =

Cast recording
- Released: December 29th, 1957
- Label: Capitol

Professional ratings
Review scores
Source	Rating
AllMusic	5/5 stars

An original Broadway cast recording of the 1957 musical The Music Man was released as an album by Capitol Records. The original release formats included LP, 4×EP, and reel-to-reel tape.

The album spent several weeks at number one on Billboard's Best Selling LPs chart.

== Track listing ==
12-inch LP (Capitol WAO 990)

Side 1
No.	Title	Artist(s)	Length
1.	"Overture & Rock Island"	Orchestra, Paul Reed & The Traveling Salesmen
2.	"Iowa Stubborn"	Ensemble
3.	"Ya Got Trouble"	Robert Preston & Ensemble
4.	"Piano Lesson"	Barbara Cook & Pert Kelton
5.	"Goodnight My Someone"	Barbara Cook
6.	"Seventy-Six Trombones"	Robert Preston & Ensemble
7.	"Sincere"	The Buffalo Bills
8.	"The Sadder-but-Wiser Girl for Me"	Robert Preston
9.	"Pick-a-Little, Talk-a-Little & Goodnight Ladies"	Misses Raymond, Swann, Mondo, Rice, Flynn & The Buffalo Bills

Side 2
No.	Title	Artist(s)	Length
1.	"Marian the Librarian"	Robert Preston
2.	"My White Knight"	Barbara Cook
3.	"Wells Fargo Wagon"	Eddie Hodges & Ensemble
4.	"It's You"	The Buffalo Bills
5.	"Shipoopi"	Iggie Wolfington & Ensemble
6.	"Lida Rose and Will I Ever Tell You"	Barbara Cook & The Buffalo Bills
7.	"Gary, Indiana"	Eddie Hodges
8.	"Till There Was You"	Barbara Cook & Robert Preston
9.	"Finale"	Entire Company

== Charts ==
Chart (1958)	Peak position
US Billboard Best Selling LPs	1

== Certifications ==
Region	Certification	Certified units/sales
United States (RIAA)	Platinum	1,000,000^{^}
^{^} Shipments figures based on certification alone.

== Awards ==
Year	Award type	Categories	Results	Ref.
1959	Grammy Awards	Best Original Cast Album (Broadway or TV)	Won	
