= Ya Got Trouble =

Song

from the album The Music Man
- Released: 1957
- Genre: Patter song Show tune
- Songwriter: Meredith Willson

"Ya Got Trouble" is a patter song by Meredith Willson from the 1957 Broadway musical The Music Man and its subsequent film adaptations in 1962 and 2003.

The song is performed by con man "Professor" Harold Hill, posing as a bandleader and traveling salesman as he attempts to scam a small town in Iowa. In order to create demand for his musical instruments, he creates a moral panic around a new pool table in the town's billiard hall and the slippery slope that, without proper supervision, would lead their children to corruption.

== Composition ==
Willson considered eliminating a long piece of dialogue from his draft of The Music Man about the serious trouble facing River City parents. However, he realized it sounded like a lyric and transformed it into "Ya Got Trouble".

== Title variations ==
The song is sometimes listed as "(Ya Got) Trouble". The original Broadway cast album lists the song title as "Trouble", both on the record jacket and label. "You Got Trouble" is a common misspelling of the song title.

== See also ==
- Bevo – Non-alcoholic malt beverage or near beer
- Dan Patch – American Standardbred racehorse
- Fawcett Publications – American publishing company that first published the humor magazine Captain Billy's Whiz Bang
- Knickerbockers – Baggy-kneed breeches popular in the early 20th-century
- Piper cubeba – Species of flowering plant used in cubeb cigarettes
- Sen-Sen – Type of breath freshener
- Tailor-made cigarette
