= Buffalo Bills (quartet) =

Barbershop quartet

The Buffalo Bills
- Origin: Buffalo, New York, United States
- Genres: Barbershop
- Years active: 1947–1967
- Labels: Decca, Columbia, RCA Victor
- Past members: Vern Reed (1947–67); Al Shea (1947–67); Herschel Smith (1947–50); Dick Grapes (1950–57); Wayne "Scotty" Ward (1957–67); Bill Spangenberg (1947–62); Jim Jones (1962–67)

The Buffalo Bills were a barbershop quartet formed in Buffalo, New York, in 1947. The quartet won the 1950 International Championship and is best known for appearing in the 1957 Broadway production The Music Man and its 1962 film version. The quartet was active for 20 years, from 1947 until their final performance in New York City in 1967.

== Origins ==
The Buffalo Bills began as an unnamed foursome, singing for community groups around Buffalo, New York. The original members of the quartet were tenor Vern Reed, an executive for the Tonawanda Boys Club; lead Al Shea, who was a City of Buffalo policeman; baritone Herschel Smith, a corporate executive; and bass Bill Spangenberg, a truck driver for a steel company. During an appearance at the Buffalo Quarterback Club, the nameless quartet was introduced as the "Buffalo Bills", which was meant to be just for the occasion, but the name stuck from that day on. Coincidentally, a football team known formerly as the Buffalo Bisons also changed its name to the Bills around the same time; the name proved popular enough that the current Buffalo Bills team also picked up the name when they debuted thirteen years later.

Their vocal coach, Phil Embury, traveled with the quartet around the world. The Bills competed in the 1948 and 1949 Barbershop Harmony Society International Quartet Contests, placing sixteenth and sixth, respectively.

== Champions ==
Baritone Herschel Smith left the quartet after he received a job promotion and was transferred to Madison, Wisconsin. Unable to find a suitable replacement, the Bills took an indefinite hiatus. They soon found baritone Dick Grapes and success quickly followed. In 1950, the Bills won the Barbershop Harmony Society International Quartet Contest, earning them the title of International Quartet Champions. Soon after their victory, they appeared on the national radio program We The People and were honored by the Manhattan and Buffalo chapters on their return trip to their hometown. Their first national television appearance was on The Faye Emerson Pepsi-Cola Show broadcast on CBS in April 1951. The Bills also performed at military bases in France, Germany, Austria, Japan, and Korea. That same year of 1951, the Bills released an album for Decca Records titled Barbershop Gems, which was issued in LP, 45 and 78 rpm formats.

== Discovery and fame ==
In the early 1950s, composer and bandleader Meredith Willson and his wife, Rini, hosted a radio program called Music Today; after listening to the Bills' records, Willson began to admire their work, and he and his wife traveled to Buffalo three years later to meet them. Soon, Willson began featuring the quartet regularly on his radio show.

In February 1957, the Buffalo Bills competed on Arthur Godfrey's Talent Scouts, won first honors, and received an invitation from Godfrey to perform on his morning show for the rest of the week. Later that year, Meredith Willson finished writing his new musical play, The Music Man, which featured a barbershop quartet in the plot. Willson invited the Bills to New York City to audition for the show. They were accepted immediately, but joining the cast of the musical meant they would all have to quit their jobs in Buffalo and relocate to New York City.

== Broadway and film ==
After the Bills committed to appear in The Music Man, baritone Dick Grapes ultimately decided to stay behind with his job and family life. He was replaced by veteran barbershop baritone Wayne "Scotty" Ward of the Great Scots quartet of Steubenville, Ohio. The foursome took one-year leaves from their jobs (which later became permanent) and moved with their families to New York City. They continued to make television and radio appearances, including The Arthur Godfrey Show. The Music Man was a hit on Broadway, running for three years and 1,375 performances. Mitch Miller, the director of artists and repertoire for Columbia Records, was a fan of barbershop harmony and signed the quartet to the label. The Bills recorded four albums for Columbia through 1961. The group also recorded an album for Warner Bros. Records in 1963 and two albums released by RCA Victor in 1965.

The Bills reprised their stage roles in The Music Man for the 1962 film adaptation of the musical. Shortly after the film was completed, bass Bill Spangenberg became ill and was forced to leave the quartet; he died in 1963. Spangenberg was replaced by Jim Jones, bass of the Sta-Laters quartet.

== Final years ==
For the next five years, the Buffalo Bills continued to perform regularly on Arthur Godfrey's show, appeared as a nightclub act, performed in regional and amateur productions of The Music Man and were headline entertainers at barbershop conventions and shows, as well as at state and county fairs and festivals around the United States and Canada. Their total career consisted of 1,510 performances on Broadway, 728 concerts, 675 radio shows, 672 night club and hotel appearances, 626 conventions, 218 television shows, 137 state fair performances, eight record albums, and one motion picture. Business disagreements and some health issues among the members led to the disbanding of the quartet in 1967. On May 24, 1967, the Buffalo Bills made their last official appearance at the Waldorf-Astoria Hotel in New York.

Vern Reed and Al Shea were the only members who were with the Buffalo Bills throughout their entire 20-year existence. The last surviving member of the quartet is Jim Jones, who lives in Orlando, Florida. Shea died in 1968, Ward in 1989, Reed in 1992, Smith in 2007, and Grapes in 2015.

Timeline

Preceded by Mid States Four	SPEBSQSA International Quartet Champions; 1950	Succeeded by Schmitt Brothers
