= Seventy-Six Trombones =

1957 show tune

Song

from the album The Music Man
- Published: 1957 by Frank Music
- Songwriter: Meredith Willson

"Seventy-Six Trombones" is a show tune and the signature song from the 1957 musical The Music Man, by Meredith Willson, a film of the same name in 1962 and a made-for-TV movie in 2003. The piece is commonly played by marching bands, military bands, and orchestras.

== In The Music Man ==
In the musical, it is the primary sales pitch for a boys' band, sung by "Professor" Harold Hill. Hill uses the song to help the townspeople of River City, Iowa, visualize their children playing in a marching band by claiming to recall a time when he saw several famous bandleaders' bands in a combined performance. While an average-sized high school marching band might have about 10 musicians playing the trombone, and a large college marching band seldom has more than 30 trombonists, the band that Harold Hill describes to the citizens includes 76 trombones, 110 cornets, "more than a thousand reeds", double bell euphoniums, and "fifty mounted cannon" (which were popular in bands of the late 19th century).

The love ballad "Goodnight My Someone", which immediately precedes "Seventy-Six Trombones" in the musical, has the same tune but is played in 3/4 time at a slower tempo. At the end of the musical, lines from "Seventy-Six Trombones" and "Goodnight My Someone" are sung in alternation with each other. This technique is used in opera, but was unknown in Broadway musicals.

== Notable performances ==
- Leroy Anderson wrote a popular arrangement of the piece incorporating other popular marches, including the National Emblem march by Edwin Eugene Bagley, the Swedish march "Under blågul fana" ("Under the Blue and Yellow Flag") by Viktor Widqvist, the Second Regiment Connecticut National Guard march by D. W. Reeves, and Stars and Stripes Forever and The Washington Post March by John Philip Sousa (in whose band Meredith Willson had actually played).
- It has long been a featured march and favorite of the Boston Pops.
- A jazzy arrangement appears on the 1963 Henry Mancini album, Our Man in Hollywood. The album notes state, "Probably the most played new march of the past decade ... the Mancini version scored for 8 trombones..."
- The 1982 Royal Variety Performance featured Howard Keel singing the song with a brass band.
- André Rieu and his orchestra customarily open and enter to the piece.

== Homages ==
In Willson's hometown of Mason City, Iowa, the song is honored (along with the whole plot of The Music Man) in a building called "Music Man Square", which is located next to Willson's boyhood home. In one large room, there are 76 donated trombones hanging from the ceiling.

== In popular culture ==
- In the romantic comedy The Other Sister, it is used as Carla and Daniel's love song.
- In the musical episode of Buffy the Vampire Slayer, "Once More, with Feeling", Spike remarks to Buffy "The day you suss out what you do want, there'll probably be a parade! With Seventy Six bloody Trombones playing!"
- In the 15th episode of the second season of American TV sitcom, The Nanny, a man is supposedly dating Fran's rival when he meets Maxwell and, after performing beginning of the song, reveals himself as a gay dancer trying to make it on Broadway (actually meeting his life partner during a revival of The Music Man).
- In Chile, the instrumental march version (with Leroy Anderson's orchestration) was used as a theme song for radio Portales news show La Revista de Portales. It was used because of an earlier use on the news show La bitácora en Portales.
- In the Netherlands, the tune was used for theme song of the popular radio and television show Dik Voormekaarshow.
- Jack Black sings the song in the 2011 film Bernie.
- The tune is often sung by Robert Hanson in Grace and Frankie.
- My Chemical Romance used the song as their walk-on music at the New Jersey stop of their 2025 "Long Live" The Black Parade tour
