= Morton DaCosta =

American dramatist

Morton DaCosta (March 7, 1914 – January 26, 1989) was an American theatre and film director, film producer, writer, and actor.

== Career ==
Born Morton Tecosky in Philadelphia, Pennsylvania, DaCosta began his career as an actor in the Broadway production of Thornton Wilder's The Skin of Our Teeth starring Tallulah Bankhead in 1942. A decade later he made his stage directing debut with The Grey-Eyed People.

DaCosta had a string of hit Broadway productions in the 1950s: Plain and Fancy, No Time for Sergeants, Auntie Mame and The Music Man.

Additional Broadway directing credits include Sherry!, The Women, Saratoga, and Maggie Flynn. He also wrote the book for the latter two productions.

DaCosta produced and directed the films Auntie Mame (1958), The Music Man (1962), and Island of Love (1963). In 1967, DaCosta was hired to direct Mrs. Brown, You've Got a Lovely Daughter (1968), starring Herman's Hermits. One month into filming, he was dismissed from the production and replaced by Saul Swimmer.

== Awards ==
The Broadway production of The Music Man earned DaCosta a Tony Award nomination for Best Director of a Musical. For the film version, he received Best Director nominations from the Directors Guild of America Awards and the Golden Globe Awards. As the producer of the film version, he also received an Oscar nomination for Best Picture.

His feature film directorial debut, the film version of Auntie Mame, was nominated for six Academy Awards including Best Picture. Both with Auntie Mame and four years later with The Music Man, DaCosta was not nominated for Best Director despite both films receiving Best Picture nominations.

DaCosta, who was always known by his nickname Tec, died of heart failure in Redding, Connecticut.
