= Buddy Hackett =

American actor (1924–2003)

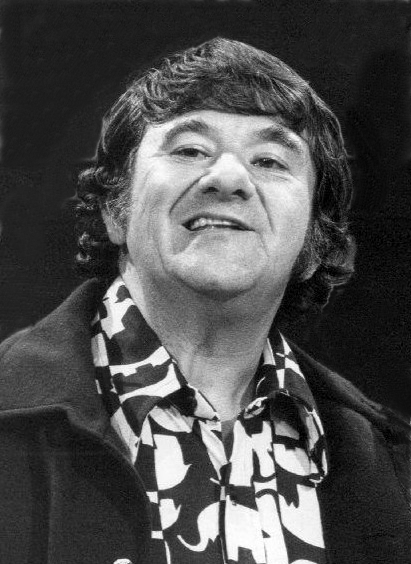
- Hackett in 1973
- Born: Leonard Hacker; August 31, 1924; New York City, New York, U.S.
- Died: June 30, 2003 (aged 78); Malibu, California, U.S.
- Occupations: Actor; comedian
- Years active: 1946–2003
- Spouse: Sherry Cohen (m. 1955)
- Children: 3, including Sandy Hackett
- Military career
- Allegiance: United States
- Branch: United States Army
- Service years: 1942–1945

Buddy Hackett (born Leonard Hacker; August 31, 1924 – June 30, 2003) was an American comedian and comic actor. Known for his raunchy material, heavy appearance and thick New York City accent, his notable roles include Marcellus Washburn in The Music Man (1962), Benjy Benjamin in It's a Mad, Mad, Mad, Mad World (1963), Tennessee Steinmetz in The Love Bug (1968) and the voice of Scuttle in The Little Mermaid (1989). He was also a frequent guest on TV game shows and variety shows.

== Early life ==
Leonard Hacker was one of two children, born into a Jewish family in Brooklyn, New York, to Anna (née Geller), who worked in the garment trades, and father, Philip Hacker, a furniture upholsterer and part-time inventor. Hackett grew up across from Public School 103 on 54th Street and 14th Avenue in Borough Park, Brooklyn, and was active in varsity football and drama club at New Utrecht High School. Hackett suffered from Bell's palsy as a child, the lingering effects of which contributed to his distinctive slurred speech and facial expression.

While still a student, Hackett worked as a "tummler" (Yiddish for "tumult maker") entertaining guests in the Catskills Borscht Belt resorts. While there, he began performing stand-up comedy in the resort nightclubs as "Butch Hacker". He appeared first at the Golden Hotel in Hurleyville, New York, claiming later he did not get one single laugh. Following his graduation from high school in 1942, Hackett enlisted in the United States Army and served during World War II for three years in an anti-aircraft battery.

== Career ==
Hackett's first job after the war was at the Pink Elephant, a Brooklyn club. It was here that he changed his name from Leonard Hacker to Buddy Hackett. He made appearances in Los Angeles and Las Vegas, and continued to perform in the Catskills. He acted on Broadway, in Lunatics and Lovers, where Max Liebman saw him and put him in two television specials.

== Screen debut ==
Hackett's movie career began in 1950, with a 10-minute "World of Sports" reel for Columbia Pictures called King of the Pins. The film demonstrated championship bowling techniques, with expert Joe Wilman demonstrating the right way and Hackett (in pantomime) showing the wrong way. There was an anecdote that, because of this appearance, Hackett received an offer from Jules White, head of Columbia's short-subject department, to join the Three Stooges. (Curly Howard had suffered a debilitating stroke in 1946.) Some authors dismissed the Hackett offer as either untrue or unfounded, despite Hackett telling Johnny Carson that it was, in fact, true:

Did I mention that I was offered the job as the third Stooge once? What happened was, Curly was very sick and I was working Billy Gray's Band Box, and Jules White come in [sic] and asked me would I want to be the third Stooge. And I thought about it, and I didn't think that I could take a rake in the eye, you know, and a hammer in the nose and tongs up your nose. And when I see 'em once pull your tongue with the pliers, I said, boy, you're gonna miss a lot of ice cream that way.

Hackett would not return to movies until 1953, after one of his nightclub routines attracted attention. With a rubber band around his head to slant his eyes, Hackett's "The Chinese Waiter" lampooned the frustration and communication problems encountered by a busy waiter in a Chinese restaurant. The dialect routine was such a hit that Hackett made a recording of it, and was hired to reprise it in the Universal-International musical Walking My Baby Back Home (1953), in which he was third-billed under Donald O'Connor and Janet Leigh.

Hackett was an emergency replacement for the similarly built Lou Costello in 1954. Abbott and Costello were set to make a feature-length comedy Fireman, Save My Child, featuring Spike Jones and His City Slickers. Several scenes had been shot with stunt doubles when Costello was forced to withdraw due to illness. Universal-International salvaged the project by hiring Hugh O'Brian and Hackett to take over the Abbott and Costello roles, with Jones and his band becoming the main attraction.

== Return to television ==
Hackett became known to a wider audience when he appeared on television in the 1950s and 60s as a frequent guest on variety talk shows hosted by Jack Paar and Arthur Godfrey, telling brash, often off-color jokes, and mugging for the camera. Hackett was a frequent guest on both the Jack Paar and the Johnny Carson versions of The Tonight Show. His regular guest appearances on Jack Paar's Tonight Show in the early 1960s were rewarded with a coveted appearance on Paar's final Tonight program on March 29, 1962.

He also appeared as a panelist and mystery guest on CBS-TV's What's My Line? and filled in as emcee for the game show Treasure Hunt. He made fifteen guest appearances on NBC-TV's The Perry Como Show between 1955 and 1961. He appeared with his roommate Lenny Bruce on the Patrice Munsel Show (1957–1958), calling their comedy duo the "Not Ready for Prime Time Players," twenty years before the cast of Saturday Night Live used the same name.

Hackett starred as the title character on NBC's Stanley, a 1956–1957 situation comedy which ran for 19 weeks on Monday evenings at 8:30 pm ET. The half-hour series also featured a young Carol Burnett and the voice of Paul Lynde. The Max Liebman-produced program aired live before a studio audience and was one of the last sitcoms from New York to do so. Stanley revolved around the adventures of the titular character (Hackett) as the operator of a newsstand in a posh New York City hotel.

Hackett appeared in two episodes on ABC's The Rifleman: "Bloodlines" (1959) and "The Clarence Bibs Story" (1961).

He appeared many times on the game show Hollywood Squares in the late 1960s and 1970s. In one episode, Hackett (who was Jewish) was asked which country had the highest ratio of doctors to populace; he answered "The country with the most Jews" -- Israel. Despite the audience roaring with laughter (and Hackett's own belief that the actual answer was Sweden), Israel was the correct answer.

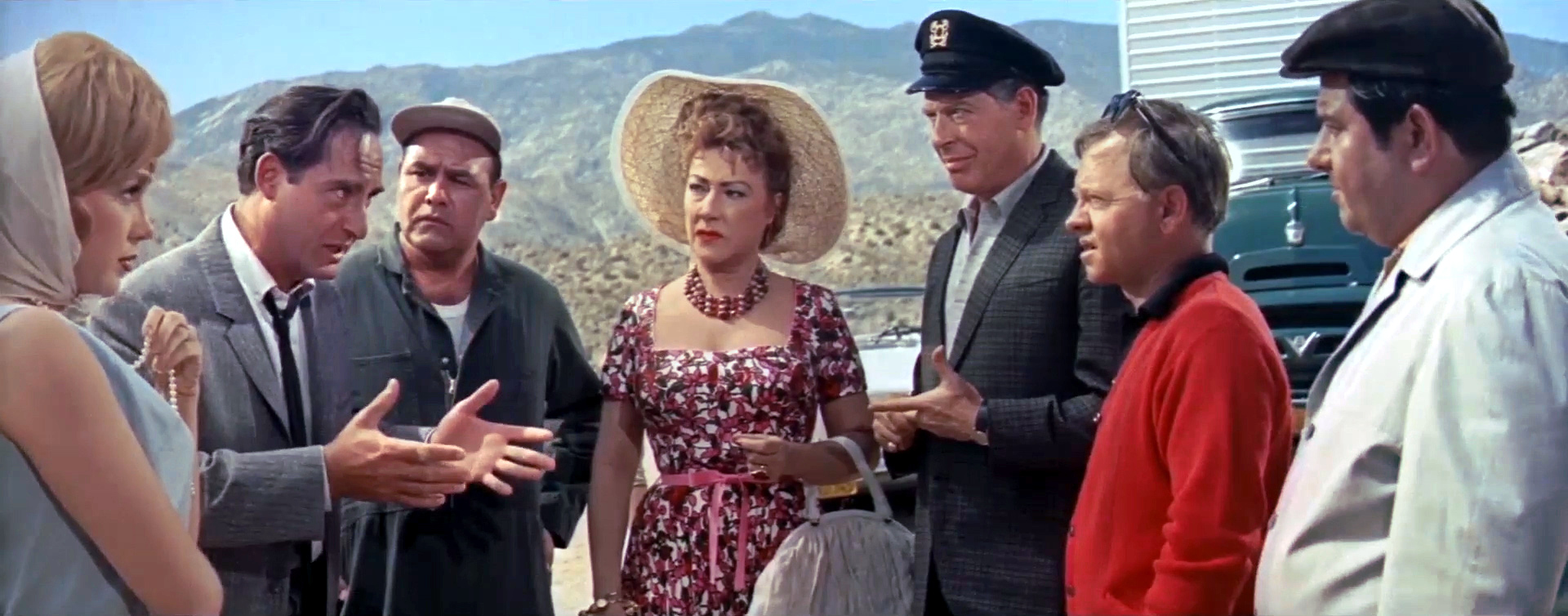
L–R: Edie Adams, Sid Caesar, Jonathan Winters, Ethel Merman, Milton Berle, Mickey Rooney, and Buddy Hackett in It's a Mad, Mad, Mad, Mad World (1963)

Hackett appeared opposite Robert Preston in the film adaptation of The Music Man (1962). In It's a Mad, Mad, Mad, Mad World (1963), Hackett was paired with Mickey Rooney, with whom he had also recently made Everything's Ducky (1961), in which they played two sailors who smuggle a talking duck aboard a Navy ship. Children became familiar with him as lovable hippie auto mechanic Tennessee Steinmetz in Disney's The Love Bug (1968).

In 1964, he had a stint on Broadway, appearing with Richard Kiley in I Had a Ball.

In the 1970s, Hackett published a book of poetry entitled The Naked Mind of Buddy Hackett, made frequent appearances on Johnny Carson's Tonight Show until Carson's retirement in 1992, delivered a dramatic performance as Lou Costello in the television movie Bud and Lou opposite Harvey Korman as Bud Abbott, and narrated the Rankin/Bass Christmas special Jack Frost (1979). Hackett appeared regularly in TV ads for Tuscan Dairy popsicles and yogurt throughout this decade, with his most famous television campaign being for Lay's potato chips ("Nobody can eat just one!"), running from 1968 to 1971. In 1980, he starred in the film Hey Babe! and hosted a syndicated revival of the 1950–61 Groucho Marx quiz show You Bet Your Life until its cancellation one year later. Hackett also appeared on The Big Valley. The Love Boat, Murder, She Wrote, L.A. Law, and in two episodes of The Fall Guy. He guest-starred on the Space Rangers episode "To Be Or Not To Be" as has-been comedian Lenny Hacker, a parody of his stage persona. He also did uncensored stand-up comedy specials for HBO.

For his contribution to the motion picture industry, Hackett was given a star on the Hollywood Walk of Fame. In 2000, a Golden Palm Star on the Palm Springs, California, Walk of Stars was dedicated to him.

In April 1998, Hackett guest starred in an episode of LateLine called "Buddy Hackett". The episode focused on a news broadcast paying tribute to Hackett following his death, only to discover that the report of his death was a mistake. Robert Reich and Dick Gephardt also appeared in the episode, paying tribute to Hackett, by singing along to Hackett's rendition of "Shipoopi" from The Music Man.

In his final years, Hackett had a recurring spot called "Tuesdays with Buddy" on The Late Late Show with Craig Kilborn in which he shared stories of his career and delivered some of his comedic routines.

In 1999, he appeared in 13 episodes of Fox's Action TV series as a security guard and chauffeur named Lonnie Dragon.

In 2021, Hackett was inducted into the New Jersey Hall of Fame.

== Personal life ==
On June 12, 1955, Hackett married Sherry Cohen. They lived in Leonia, New Jersey, in the late 1950s. In August 1958, they bought the house previously owned by deceased crime boss Albert Anastasia in Fort Lee, New Jersey. After renovations, they moved in and lived there through most of the 1960s. In 2003, Hackett and his wife established the Singita Animal Sanctuary in California's San Fernando Valley. Hackett's son, Sandy, followed his father into the comedy world, and for years opened for his father before his performances. Sandy created a one-man stage show about his father after his death.

He was an avid firearms collector and owned a large collection that he sold off in his later years.

== Death ==
In the early 1990s, Hackett was diagnosed with severe heart disease, but steadfastly refused to consider bypass surgery. His heart disease was the primary cause of his death on June 30, 2003, at his beach house in Malibu, California, at the age of 78. His son, comedian Sandy Hackett, said his father had been suffering from diabetes for several years and suffered a stroke nearly a week before his death, which also may have contributed to his demise.

== Discography ==
- How You Do (Coral Records CRL 757422)
- The Original Chinese Waiter (Dot 3351, reissued as Pickwick SPC 3198)
- Ba-Lert

== Filmography ==
=== Features ===
Year	Title	Role	Notes
1953	Walking My Baby Back Home	Blimp Edwards	
1954	Fireman Save My Child	Smokey Hinkle	
1958	God's Little Acre	Pluto Swint	also Sheriff Candidate
1961	All Hands on Deck	Shrieking Eagle Garfield	
1961	Everything's Ducky	Seaman Admiral John Paul 'Ad' Jones	
1962	The Music Man	Marcellus Washburn	
1962	The Wonderful World of the Brothers Grimm	Hans	(Segment: 'The Singing Bone')
1963	It's a Mad, Mad, Mad, Mad World	Benjy Benjamin	
1964	Muscle Beach Party	S.Z. Matts	
1964	The Golden Head	Lionel Pack	
1966	The Big Valley	Charlie Sawyer	TV Show S2-E1 "Hidden Treasure"
1969	The Love Bug	Tennessee Steinmetz	
1969	The Good Guys and the Bad Guys	Ed	Uncredited
1978	Loose Shoes	Himself	also S.T.O.P.-I.T Spokesman
1978	Bud and Lou	Lou Costello	TV movie
1979	Jack Frost	Pardon-Me-Pete	Voice, TV special
1982	The Fall Guy	Ozzie	TV Show S1-E13 "The Adventures of Ozzie and Harold"
1983	The Fall Guy	Ozzie/Harold	TV Show S2-E13 "The Further Adventures of Ozzie and Harold"
1983	Hey Babe!	Sammy Cohen	
1987	Murder, She Wrote	Murray Gruen	TV Show S3-E18 "No Laughing Murder"
1988	Scrooged	Scrooge	
1989	The Little Mermaid	Scuttle	Voice
1998	Paulie	Artie	
2000	The Little Mermaid II: Return to the Sea	Scuttle	Voice direct-to-video

=== Short subjects ===
Year	Title	Notes
1950	King of the Pins	Pantomime
1961	The Shoes	
1992	Mouse Soup	Voice
2015	The Concept	Animation short by band HeCTA and Chris Shepherd
