= Bevo (drink) =

Non-alcoholic malt beverage or near beer

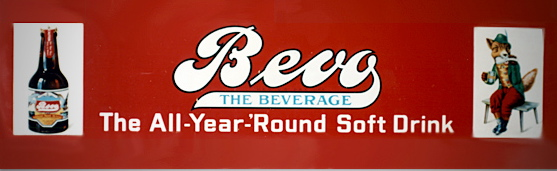
Bevo sign

Bevo was a non-alcoholic malt beverage, or near beer, brewed in the United States by the Anheuser-Busch company beginning in the early 20th century. Bevo enjoyed its greatest success during the time of Prohibition, when beer, wine and distilled liquors were made illegal for thirteen years.

== Prohibition ==
The Anheuser-Busch company started brewing Bevo when alcoholic beverages were prohibited in 1916 by the United States armed forces. Production rose greatly with national prohibition in 1919, and Bevo was by far the most popular of the many "cereal beverages" or "near beers" of the time. At the peak of its popularity in the early 1920s, more than five million cases of Bevo were sold annually.

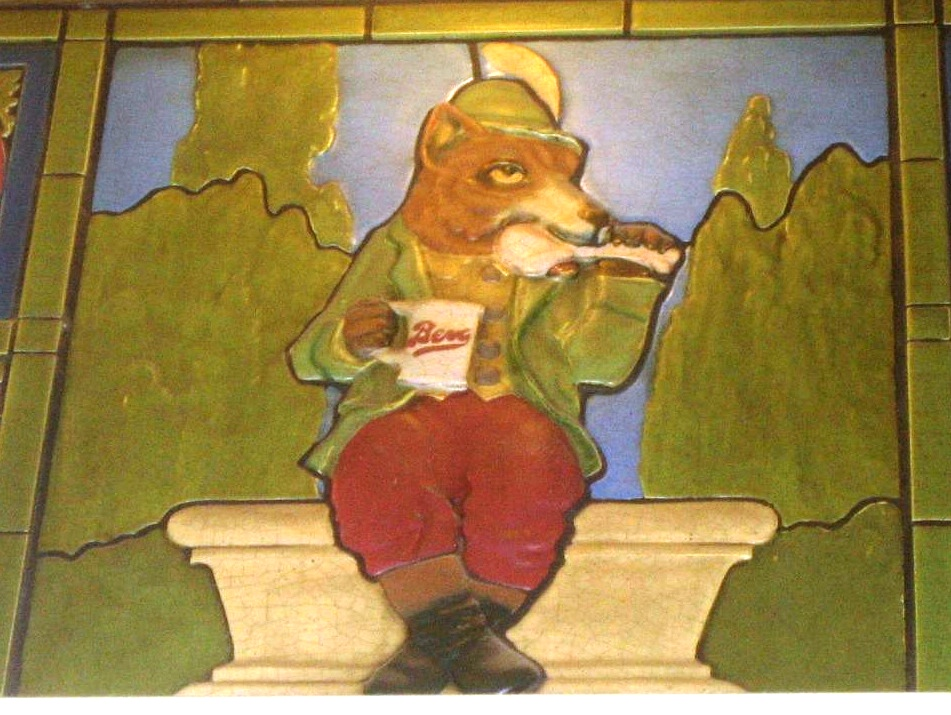
Renard with a mug of Bevo, depicted in terra cotta on the interior walls of the Bevo building, St. Louis

Labels on the bottles billed it as "Bevo the Beverage". The name "Bevo" was coined from the word "beverage" and the Slavic language word for beer, pivo, and was pronounced "Bee-vo".

== Decline ==
In the late 1920s, bootleg beer and liquor, both smuggled and "homebrew", cut into Bevo's marketshare. With sales flattening to 100,000 cases by 1929, Anheuser-Busch stopped production.

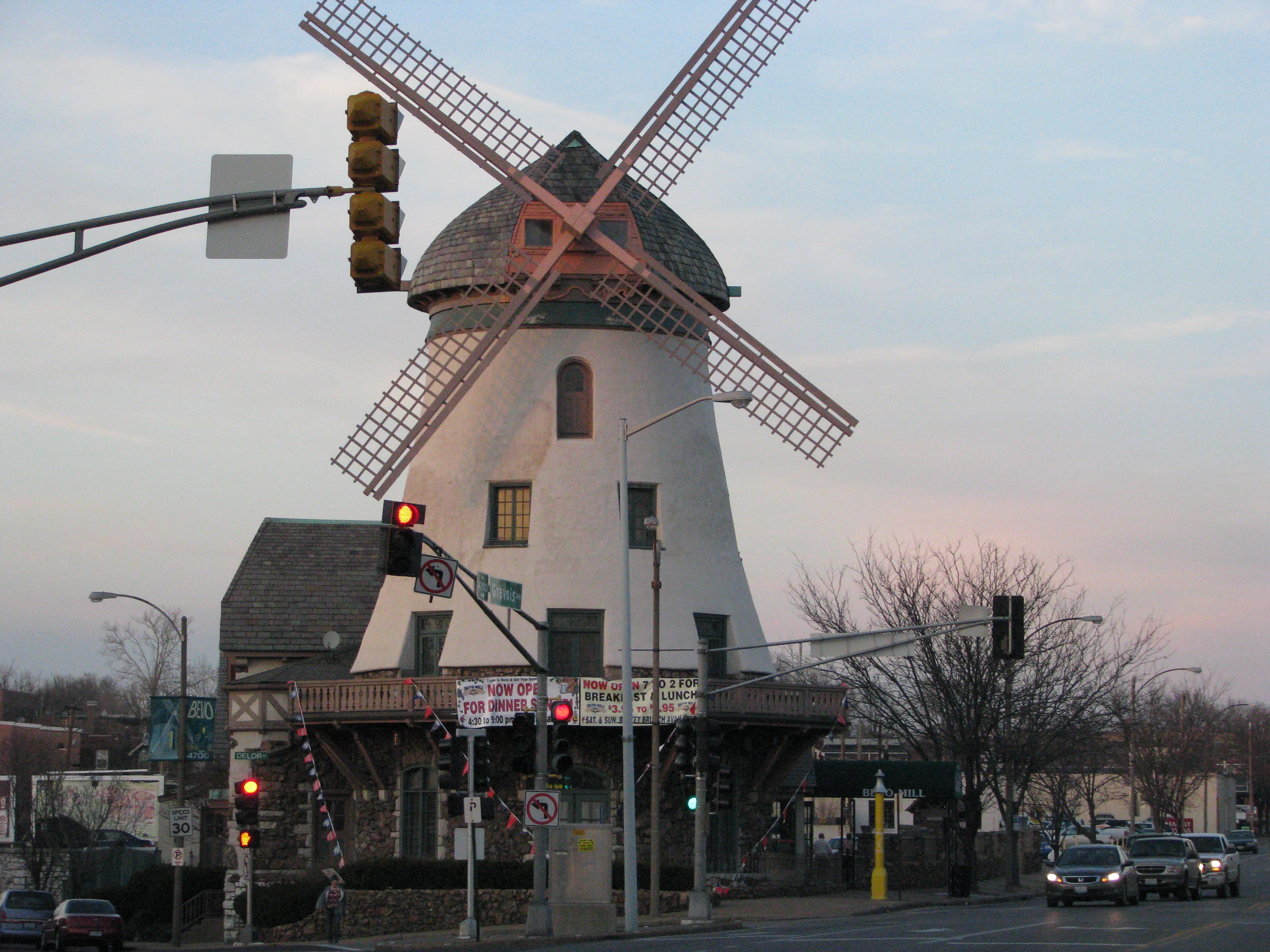
The Bevo Mill, St. Louis, in 2008

The Bevo building, with the Renard character prominently displayed at the corners, still operates as a bottling facility at their main brewery in St. Louis, Missouri. The landmark Bevo Mill, constructed by August Anheuser Busch, Sr. in 1917, was closed in 2009, but reopened in October 2009 under new owners.

== Advertising ==
Some Bevo advertising featured the character "Renard the Fox" (based on the protagonist of a medieval French folk tale), and promotional mugs with this character were manufactured. In 1930, Anheuser-Busch built a series of boat-bodied cars in its St. Louis shops called the "Bevo Boats" which were used for promotion. Seven are believed to have been built on Pierce-Arrow 8-cylinder chassis while one surviving example was based upon 1930 Cadillac 353 V8.

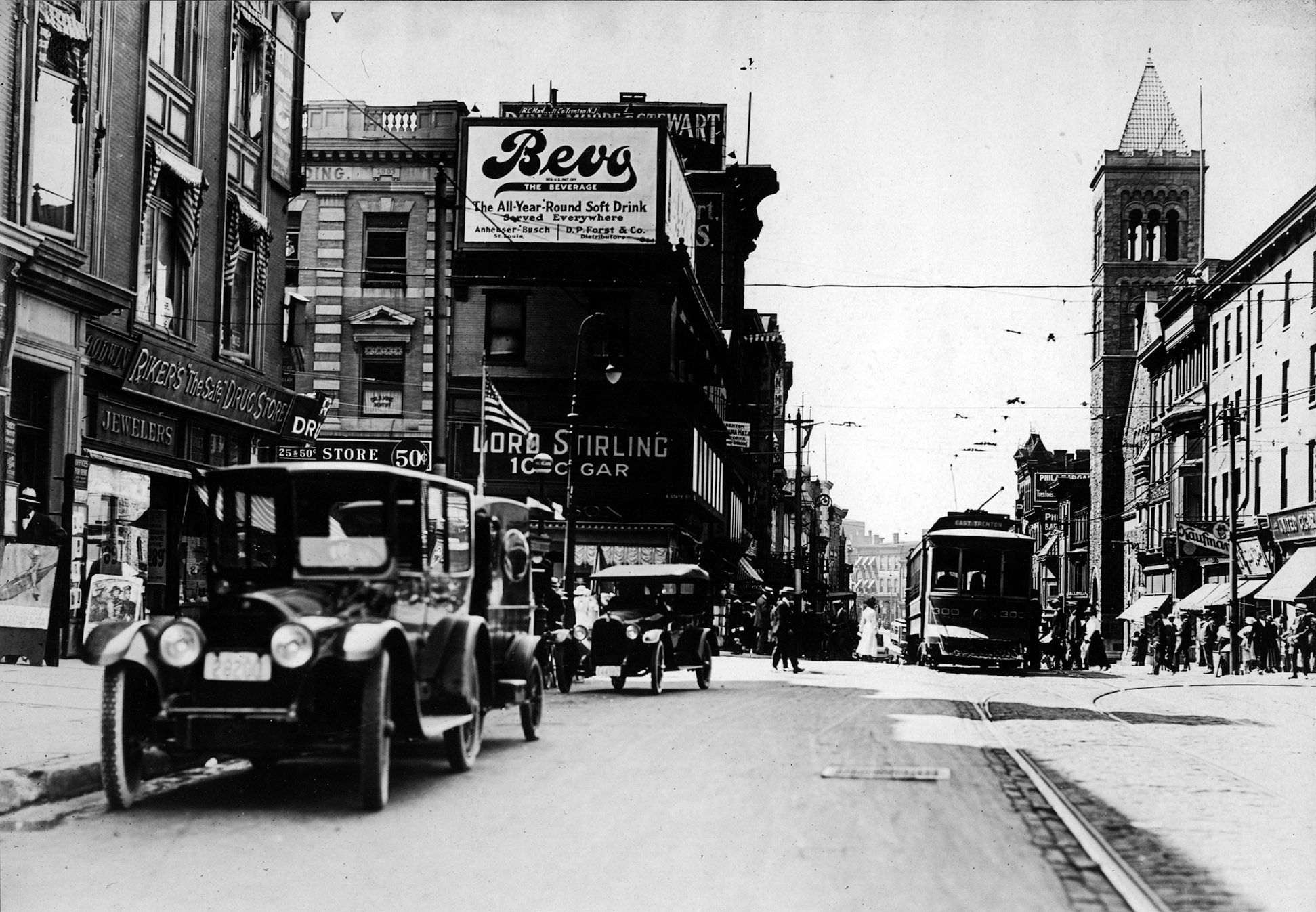
Billboard advertising Bevo in Trenton, New Jersey, 1917

A contemporary advertisement read "Cooling and invigorating, Bevo the Beverage. Order by the case from your grocer, druggist, or dealer." The paper label on the back of the bottle read "The All-Year-Round Soft Drink. Appetizing - Healthful - Nutritious - Refreshing. Milk or water may contain bacteria. BEVO never does."

== Popular culture ==
Bevo became part of the popular culture of the time, and is mentioned in various popular songs and vaudeville skits of the era. This led to secondary slang uses of the word; for example, in American military slang a young and inexperienced officer was called a "Bevo". The University of Texas named its mascot "Bevo", a name which has stuck to this day.

Irving Berlin included a paean to the drink, "You Can't Stay Up on Bevo", in his 1917 army revue, Yip Yip Yaphank. In addition, in his song "The Near Future", which includes the ubiquitous lyric "How Dry I Am", Bevo is featured prominently. As the Prohibition Era was starting, "On the Streets of Cairo" by Jesse G. M. Gluck & Geo. P. Hulten assured people that in Cairo, "you won't have to drink pale Bevo, Booze there has a kick."

In 1919, Tim Moore, a vaudeville comedian who had just arrived in Detroit to fulfill a theatrical booking, wrote this line to a Chicago newspaper editor, "Dry Detroit, Mich.; Dear Pal Tony: Just a few lines to let you know we arrived safely in the home of Ford's Tin Lizzies, "Bevo" and other temperate beers."

Bevo is mentioned in Ernest Hemingway's short story "The Killers" (1927), John O'Hara's short story "The Bucket of Blood" (1962), Sinclair Lewis's novel Babbitt (1922), and Thornton Wilder's novel Theophilus North (1973).

Decades later, Bevo was mentioned in the song "Ya Got Trouble" in the musical The Music Man as a reference to an objectionable aspect of the culture of young people during the time in which the musical was set (although The Music Man was set in 1912, four years prior to Bevo's introduction).

In 2009 the beverage was mentioned briefly in the 1927 set webcomic Lackadaisy by Tracy Butler.

== See also ==
- Malzbier, a nutritional German drink with 1% or less of alcohol
- Non-alcoholic beer
