= Patriot Games (Family Guy) =

- Family Guy episode
- Episode no.: Season 4 Episode 20
- Directed by: Cyndi Tang
- Written by: Mike Henry
- Production code: 4ACX25
- Original air date: January 29, 2006

Guest appearances
- Tom Brady as himself; Troy Brown as himself; Carol Channing as herself; Bob Costas as himself; Jay Leno as himself; Jeff Bergman as Fred Flintstone; Alexander Siddig as London Sillinannies Player

Episode chronology
← Previous "Brian Sings and Swings"	Next → "I Take Thee Quagmire"
- Family Guy season 4

"Patriot Games" is the 20th episode of the fourth season of the animated television series Family Guy. It originally aired on Fox on January 29, 2006, a week before Super Bowl XL, fitting the theme of the episode. In it, Peter goes to his high school reunion and meets Tom Brady. After Peter runs to the bathroom and tackles most of the people in his way, Brady hires him for the New England Patriots. Peter wins many games for the Patriots but is fired for showboating and is traded to a team in London called the Sillinannies. Peter plays versus the Patriots and loses, but still receives Brady's respect before he and the Griffin family return home. Meanwhile, Stewie becomes a bookie who violently attacks Brian until he pays off his debt.

"Patriot Games" was written by Mike Henry and directed by Cyndi Tang, Pete Michels, Peter Shin and Dan Povenmire, and guest starred Tom Brady, Troy Brown, Jay Leno, Carol Channing, and Bob Costas as themselves. The episode received positive reviews from critics and finished as the 55th most-watched program of the week.

== Plot summary ==
At his high school reunion, Peter pretends to be a secret agent-astronaut-millionaire who wears a cowboy hat to impress his classmates, but the truth comes out when he meets Tom Brady. He subsequently gets drunk and has to make a run for the bathroom, knocking over everyone between him and the bathroom. Brady is impressed and gets Peter a spot on the New England Patriots football team as the starting center. Peter is soon fired for showboating in a game versus the Dallas Cowboys, driving on to the field then performing a massively choreographed version of the song "Shipoopi" after scoring one touchdown. He is traded to the London Sillinannies, who apparently have no clue how to play football. Peter decides to turn them around and challenges Brady to a game between the Sillinannies and the Patriots. On the opening kickoff, Peter's teammates become terrified of the Patriots rushing toward them and run away, leaving Peter to face them alone. He tries and is immediately tackled. However, Brady compliments Peter on having the nerve to stand up to them, having now regained his respect.

Meanwhile, Stewie becomes a bookie and takes a $50 bet from Brian on a Celebrity Boxing match pitting Mike Tyson against Carol Channing. Brian bets on Tyson and loses, as Channing kept getting up no matter how many times Tyson knocks her down and Tyson passed out due to exhaustion. Stewie comes to collect, but Brian laughs him off, so Stewie tells him to have the money in 24 hours. After 24 hours, Stewie asks for the money owed, but Brian says he does not have it and to give him until next Friday. Stewie reveals that he is serious about settling the bet and brutally beats up Brian, breaking his glass of orange juice over his head, beating him with a towel rack, and slamming his head in the toilet. Brian tries to avoid paying and Stewie attacks him on another occasion, using such means as a golf club, shooting him in both knees with a pistol, and burning him up with a flamethrower to coerce him into paying up. After this and that avoiding giving the money is not worth the pain, Brian agrees to pay off the bet. After Stewie's bet is satisfied, he offers Brian an opportunity to get one "free revenge shot" to make up for all the torture he caused. Brian accepts the offer, but leaves Stewie in suspense as to when the free hit will be delivered, until Stewie is overcome with paranoia and starts beating himself up in an attempt to satisfy Brian. After biding his time and making Stewie worry about what could happen, Brian—while the Griffins are in London, leaving the Patriots-Sillinannies game—nonchalantly shoves Stewie in front of a moving bus.

== Production ==
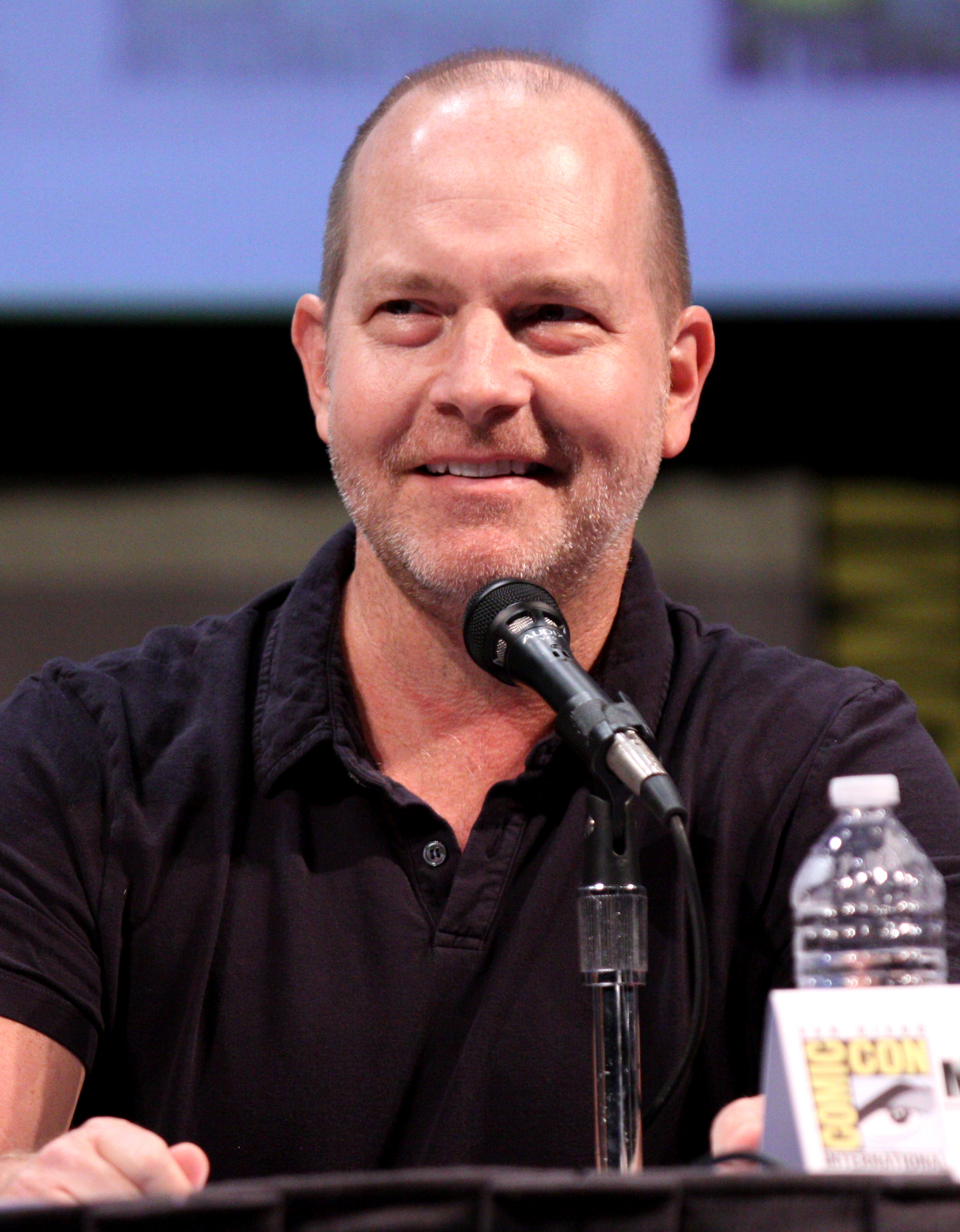
Mike Henry wrote the episode.

"Patriot Games" was written by Mike Henry, and directed by Peter Shin, Pete Michels and Cyndi Tang. The episode aired on January 29, 2006, a week before Super Bowl XL. Actress Carol Channing made a guest appearance as herself in the scene of the boxing match between her and professional boxer Mike Tyson, though Tyson did not voice himself. Sportscaster Bob Costas also voiced himself in a short scene in which he interviews Peter and Tom Brady. Much of the episode was scripted with Patriots coach Bill Belichick in mind, but Brady was chosen to replace him. After numerous requests for Brady to voice himself in the episode, he eventually agreed. Comedian Jay Leno voiced himself in two short scenes that show him, respectively, threatening and attempting to kill Brady.

Two scenes in which Stewie brutally beats up Brian using a glass filled with orange juice, various household objects, and guns polarized people who viewed it. Several production members were offended. Cast members—as well as MacFarlane's mother and an animal rights advocate—enjoyed the scene; MacFarlane quoted his mother: "I don't see what the problem is? He (Brian) owed him (Stewie) money!", and so it was kept in the final cut. When Lois gives the finger to the camera during the interview with Peter and Brady, her hand was blurred out on Fox airings of the episode. However, reruns on Adult Swim and TBS left the gesture intact. The gesture was also left intact on the DVD of "Volume Four"; the production team enjoyed having this level of freedom. After the initial airing of the episode, where newscaster Tom Tucker announces a report on a fictional curse word, clemen, many viewers looked up the word on the Internet to try to find a definition. MacFarlane stated in the episode's DVD commentary that if someone invents an obscene definition for the word, the show will have to stop using it (it has not been used since this episode).

In 2009, the bathroom scene was reused for a series of YouTube videos promoting the Primetime Emmy Award for Outstanding Comedy Series nominations that Family Guy received for consideration to voters for the 61st Primetime Emmy Awards. In it, Brian considers voting for the fellow nominees—The Office, Flight of the Conchords, Entourage, 30 Rock, How I Met Your Mother, and Weeds. In the first five videos, Stewie brutally beats up Brian for his different votes, in their respective videos, asking "Where's my Emmy, man?" and forces him to vote for Family Guy. In the last video, when Brian thinks about voting for Weeds, Stewie doesn't beat him up and instead says, "Oh, fuck this. I'm not doing one for fucking Weeds," referring to the declining quality of the show within its fourth season.

== Cultural references ==
The episode features a 2.5-minute rendition of the song "Shipoopi" from the 1957 musical The Music Man, conducted by Peter and performed by the Patriots and people in the stadium. The rendition was directed by Dan Povenmire, who would later go on to co-create Phineas and Ferb with Jeff "Swampy" Marsh. The original number in The Music Man was performed by around 40 or 50 singers and around 80 other musicians, as estimated by MacFarlane. Family Guy's rendition was recorded by an orchestra not as large as the original's, but one of the largest the show has ever used. Another musical number, in which the London Sillinannies sing while dancing around a maypole, was taken from the Gilbert and Sullivan production The Sorcerer. A visual joke that shows Peter's $30,000 wax sculpture of Harriet Tubman "doing" a naked Gwyneth Paltrow originally featured the droid R2-D2 from Star Wars in place of Tubman. MacFarlane is a fan of Star Wars, and its characters are often featured in the series' jokes. A spoof drama programme called Condensation is shown on BBC Four, which is a BBC channel dedicated to the arts, culture and factual programmes. The episode title is taken from the 1987 Tom Clancy novel Patriot Games.

== Reception ==
"Patriot Games" was watched by 8.45 million viewers, making it the 55th most-watched program of the week. According to MacFarlane, the episode polarized viewers, who either "hated or loved the violence". Ryan J. Budke from AOL's TV Squad gave the episode a positive review, specifically praising the scene in which Stewie beats up Brian. Budke also said that it was "fun" and that you could tell the crew had a good time making it. Overall, he considered it "not a bad episode". The "Shipoopi" scene eventually became one of the most popular videos on YouTube. The episode ranked number 1 in IGN's Top 10 Musical Moments in the show, for "Shipoopi," and Stewie's assault on Brian in the bathroom was named the 5th greatest fight scene in the show on another list.
