= Meg Bussert =

American opera singer (born 1949)

- Born: October 21, 1949 (age 76); Chicago, Illinois, United States
- Genres: Musical theater
- Occupations: Actress, singer, university professor
- Years active: 1973–present

Meg Bussert (born October 21, 1949) is an American actress, singer and a university professor.

== Early life ==
Born in Chicago, Illinois, Bussert received her BA degree from Purchase College and her MAT from Manhattanville College.

== Career ==
Bussert made her Broadway debut in the 1973 revival of Irene as the Debutante. She was the standby for Lettie and Hope Langdon in Something's Afoot in 1976.

Her big break came in 1980 when she was cast in two revivals: The Music Man (with Dick Van Dyke) as Marian Paroo, and Brigadoon (with Martin Vidnovic) as Fiona MacLaren. She won the Theatre World Award for her performance in both, and a Tony Award nomination as Best Actress in a Musical for the latter. This revival of The Music Man closed after just 21 performances.

Bussert appeared as Guinevere opposite Richard Harris as King Arthur in a national tour and 1981 Broadway revival of Camelot. The production was taped for broadcast by HBO and she was nominated for a CableACE Award. In 2005 she was the standby for the character of Florence Foster Jenkins in the Broadway production of Souvenir.

Bussert's regional theatre credits include The Music Man, South Pacific (US tour, 1985 as Nellie),Phantom (at the Westchester Broadway Theater in 1992), Damn Yankees, The Most Happy Fella, and Cabaret. In 2010, she performed in The Sound of Music at the Ogunquit Playhouse as Mother Abbess. She had previously performed this role at the Paper Mill Playhouse in 2003.

She performs in concerts, recitals, and cabarets. In 2013 she performed in a concert performance at the Laurie Beechman Theatre (New York City), titled "Two Legit to Quit: a Riff-Free Evening".

She has appeared in opera and operettas, including concert performances of The New Moon and The Firefly at the Town Hall, Pittsburgh Civic Light Opera’s The Student Prince and the Mirvish’s North American tour of H.M.S. Pinafore. She appeared in the Portland Opera production of Lucy's Lapses in 1990.

Bussert presently is a full-time associate professor in Vocal Performance teaching Acting and Music Theatre Studies at New York University, in the Steinhardt School of Culture, Education, and Human Development.
