= Franklin Lacey =

American playwright and screenwriter

Franklin Lacey (1917–1988) was an American playwright and screenwriter. He is best known for co-authoring the story for The Music Man (1957), together with collaborator Meredith Willson, and later collaborating on the screenplay with Marion Hargrove for the 1962 film version. One of his first major works was the play Pagan in the Parlor in 1949; it was directed for the stage by Frankenstein director James Whale. He also wrote the screenplay for the film Rain for a Dusty Summer (1971), which starred Ernest Borgnine. He worked closely with the author Aldous Huxley on a musical version of his novel Brave New World, but the project was eventually shelved.
