= Till There Was You =

1957 song written by Meredith Willson

Song

from the album The Music Man
- Published: 1957 by Frank Music
- Songwriter: Meredith Willson

"Till There Was You" is a show tune written by Meredith Willson, popularised by his 1957 stage production The Music Man and its 1962 movie musical adaptation, and further popularised by the Beatles’ cover.

The song became the first Top 40 hit for Anita Bryant in 1959, prior to being recorded by the Beatles in 1963.

== Origins ==
First recorded as "Till I Met You" by Eileen Wilson on October 25, 1950, this earlier incarnation of the song was also performed by Fran Warren for The Big Show on January 14, 1951.

The revised song "Till There Was You" was first produced and released by Nelson Riddle, featuring his orchestra and 17-year-old vocalist Sue Raney. Promotional copies of the 7-inch single (Capitol P3847) were released November 26, 1957, preceding the December 19 opening of the original Broadway production, and a full month ahead of the original cast album.

Performed in the second act of The Music Man by librarian Marian Paroo, the song was recorded by Barbara Cook for the original Broadway cast album, and by Shirley Jones for the 1962 movie adaptation.

== Anita Bryant version ==
"Till There Was You"
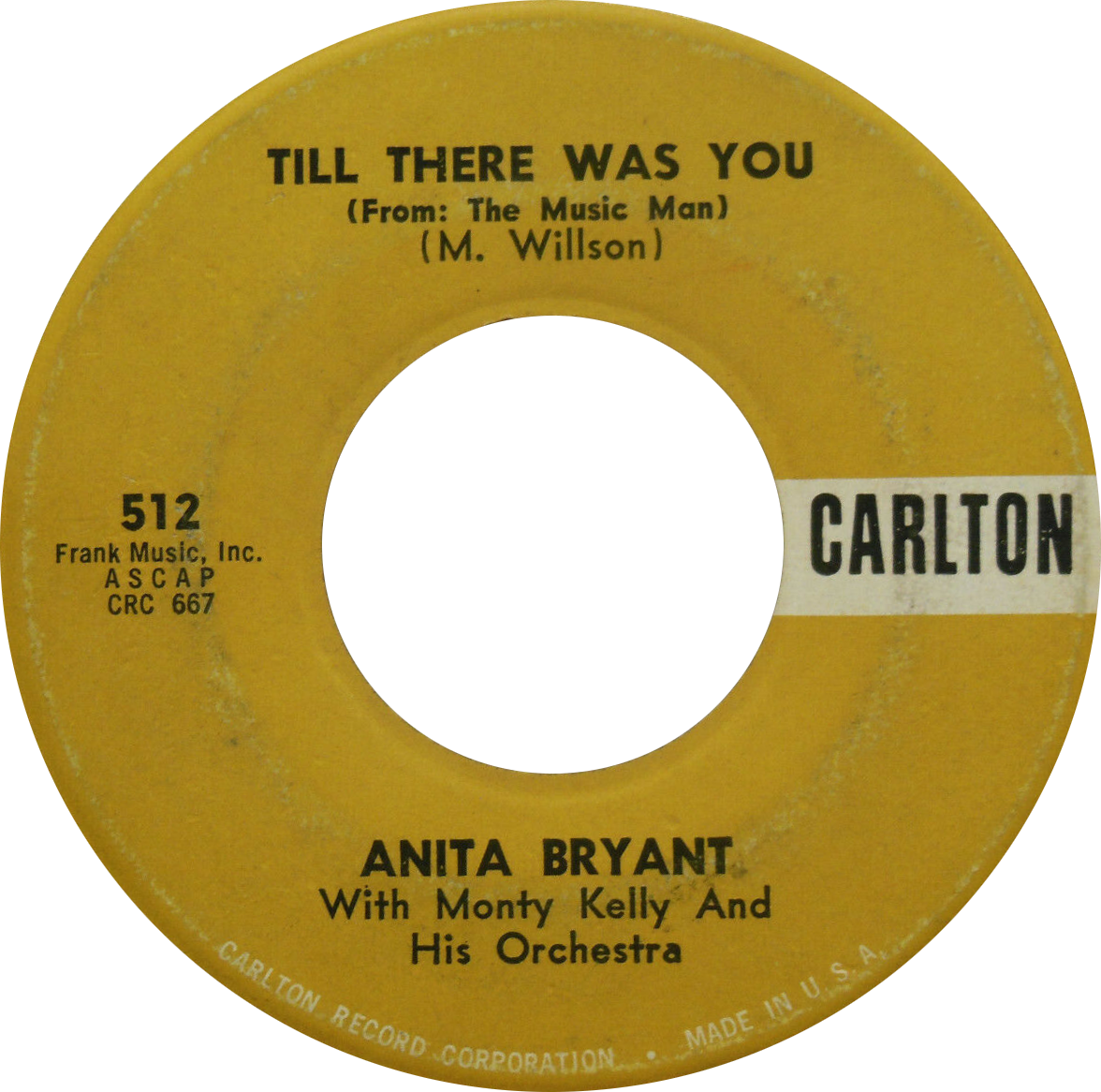
- US single of Anita Bryant recording

Single by Anita Bryant
- B-side: "Little George (Got the Hiccoughs)"
- Released: May 1959
- Genre: Pop
- Length: 2:10
- Label: Carlton Records 512
- Songwriter: Meredith Willson

Anita Bryant singles chronology
| "Till There Was You" (1959) | "Six Boys and Seven Girls" (1959) |

In 1959, American singer Anita Bryant recorded the song "Till There Was You" and released it as a single. Her version reached number 30 on the US Billboard Hot 100 chart and number 14 on the Cashbox Top 100.

=== Chart performance ===
| Chart (1959) | Peak position |
|---|---|
| U.S. Billboard Hot 100 | 30 |
| U.S. Cash Box Top 100 | 14 |

== The Beatles version ==
"Till There Was You"
- Cover of the song's sheet music

Song by the Beatles

from the album With the Beatles
- Released: November 22, 1963 (mono); November 30, 1963 (stereo)
- Recorded: July 18 and 30, 1963
- Studio: EMI, London
- Genre: Bolero
- Length: 2:16
- Label: Parlophone
- Songwriter: Meredith Willson
- Producer: George Martin

Audio sample
- "'Till There Was You": file; help

"Till There Was You" was recorded by the Beatles in 1963 and released on their second album With the Beatles (1963) (United Kingdom) and Meet the Beatles! (1964) (United States). It was the only song from a Broadway show released by the band.

The Beatles' version is sung by Paul McCartney, who is accompanied by George Harrison and John Lennon on dueling acoustic, classical guitars played in a Spanish style over a bolero bongo beat played by Ringo Starr. The song was produced by George Martin. Its guitar solo is by George Harrison. The widow of Meredith Willson, the composer of The Music Man, has stated that her husband's estate eventually received more income from the royalties of the Beatles recordings of "Till There Was You" than it originally received from the actual play.

Paul McCartney was introduced to Peggy Lee's 1961 cover of the song through his older cousin Bett Robbins, who would occasionally babysit the two McCartney brothers. McCartney said that he "had no idea until much later" that it was from The Music Man. The song was part of their pre-recording repertoire in 1962, and they performed it at the Star Club in Hamburg. It became illustrative of the Beatles' versatility, proving that they could appeal to all sections of an audience, moving easily from softer ballads to harder rock and roll, as in their appearance on November 4, 1963, at the Royal Variety Performance when they followed this song with "Twist and Shout".

The band had included "'Till There Was You" as part of their unsuccessful audition for Decca Records in London on January 1, 1962. It was the second of five songs that they performed during their first appearance on The Ed Sullivan Show on February 9, 1964. During said performance, each of the Beatles was introduced by his first name via a subtitle, memorably ending with Lennon, who had the cheeky caption "Sorry girls, he's married:" under his name.

Live versions of the song were released on Live at the BBC (1994) and Anthology 1 (1995). A live performance by McCartney appears on his DVD The Space Within US (2006). In 2016, the BBC announced that a "holy grail" Beatles record would be auctioned in March of that year, a private pressing which features "Hello Little Girl" and "Till There Was You" and was valued at over £10,000. It was said to be one of the "rarest and most collectable of all Beatles records" by Mark Lewisohn, one of the foremost authorities on the Beatles. The disc eventually sold for £77,500.

=== Personnel ===
- Paul McCartney – lead vocal, bass guitar
- John Lennon – nylon-string guitar
- George Harrison – nylon-string guitar
- Ringo Starr – bongos

== Other versions ==
- Marlene Dietrich recorded an unreleased live version, probably in Chicago during her 1961 U.S. tour (Burt Bacharach, arr., cond.).
- Jazz vocalist Sue Raney recorded the tune with the Nelson Riddle Orchestra on October 29, 1957, for her first album, When Your Lover Has Gone. This recording pre-dated the opening of The Music Man by about 6 weeks.
- Jazz saxophonist Sonny Rollins recorded the song on his groundbreaking album Freedom Suite (1958). An alternate take is provided on the 1999 CD rerelease.
- Peggy Lee recorded it for her album Latin ala Lee! (1960). In March 1961, this version was a minor hit in the UK.
- Guitar instrumentalist Chet Atkins recorded the single for his album Teensville (1960).
- Etta Jones recorded a version for her album Something Nice (1961).
- Gene McDaniels covered the song on his 1961 album 100 lbs of Clay.
- Al Hirt released a version on his album, Horn A-Plenty (1962).
- Nana Mouskouri recorded a slow, romantic, velvety version as originally the closing track on her acclaimed Great American Songbook album Nana Mouskouri in New York (The Girl from Greece Sings) (1962), produced by Quincy Jones.
- In 1962, an instrumental version of Meredith Willson's song by Valjean was also popular.
- In 1963, Sergio Franchi recorded this song on his RCA Victor Red Seal album Broadway... I Love You.
- In 1966, Marvin Gaye and Kim Weston recorded this song on album Take Two.
- In 1974, Ray Charles recorded this song on his Crossover Records album Come Live With Me
- In 1984, Brazilian singer Beto Guedes released a version in Portuguese called "Quando te vi" (When I saw you), written by Ronaldo Bastos.
- In 1997, Los Hooligans recorded and released the song on their Moon Ska Records album "Traditions".
- In 1998, Ellen Albertini Dow sang this in the movie The Wedding Singer, though this rendition does not appear on the official soundtrack.
- In 2000, Peter MacNicol, Lisa Nicole Carson, and Jane Krakowski performed a version of the song on TV show Ally McBeal's season 3 episode "Turning Thirty".
- In 2003, Rod Stewart recorded his version on his album As Time Goes By: The Great American Songbook, Volume II.
- Piolo Pascual recorded his version for the like-named 2003 film.
- The Smithereens recorded the song on their 2007 album Meet The Smithereens!, which consists entirely of cover versions of songs from the Meet the Beatles! album.
- In 2008, Cassandra Wilson recorded the song on her album loverly.
- In 2009, Katherine Jenkins recorded the song on her album Believe.
