= Shipoopi =

1957 song by Meredith Willson

Song

from the album The Music Man
- Language: English
- Released: 1957
- Genre: Show tune
- Length: 2:21
- Songwriter: Meredith Willson

"Shipoopi" is a song in the 1957 musical The Music Man by Meredith Willson. The song is sung by the character of Marcellus Washburn, a friend of con man "Professor" Harold Hill. It occurs in act 2 of the play during the dance committee's rehearsal which the town kids interrupt.

Neither the song's lyrics nor the surrounding dialogue explain the meaning of the term "shipoopi", which Willson invented for the song and acts as a term of endearment.

In the original 1957 Broadway production, the song was performed by actor Iggie Wolfington, who portrayed Marcellus Washburn. In the 1962 film version of The Music Man, Marcellus is played by Buddy Hackett. According to the film documentary included with the extended DVD release, choreographer Onna White was able to take Hackett, not known as a dancer, and make him into a dancer for this number.

In the 2022 Broadway revival, the lyrics for the song were altered, with new lyrics by Marc Shaiman and Scott Wittman.

== In popular culture ==
- In "Patriot Games", the 20th episode of the fourth season of the animated TV series Family Guy, Peter Griffin leads the crowd (except for Tom Brady, who guest starred as himself) in a full rendition of "Shipoopi" after he scores a touchdown as a member of the New England Patriots football team.
- In the TV series LateLine, the song is featured in an episode about a false report of the death of Buddy Hackett.
- Vern Fonk, an auto insurance provider in the U.S. Pacific Northwest, known for off-color and humorous commercials, uses the phrase shipoopi in his commercial "Dance".
- In season 4, episode 2 of Doom Patrol, the song is performed by some singing and dancing "butt monsters".
- In the "He-Man and the Masters of the Universe" episode House of Shokoti Part 2, a recurring gag is that Ram-Man continually mispronounces the episode's eponymous witch's name, and on one occasion he refers to her as Shipoopi before Shokoti angrily corrects him.
- Performed by Drew Carey on the 9th episode of the first season of Blue Collar TV, in a sketch involving Southerners on a hunting trip performing increasingly flamboyant song and dance numbers in the woods.
