= The Music Man (1962 film) =

American musical film by Morton DaCosta

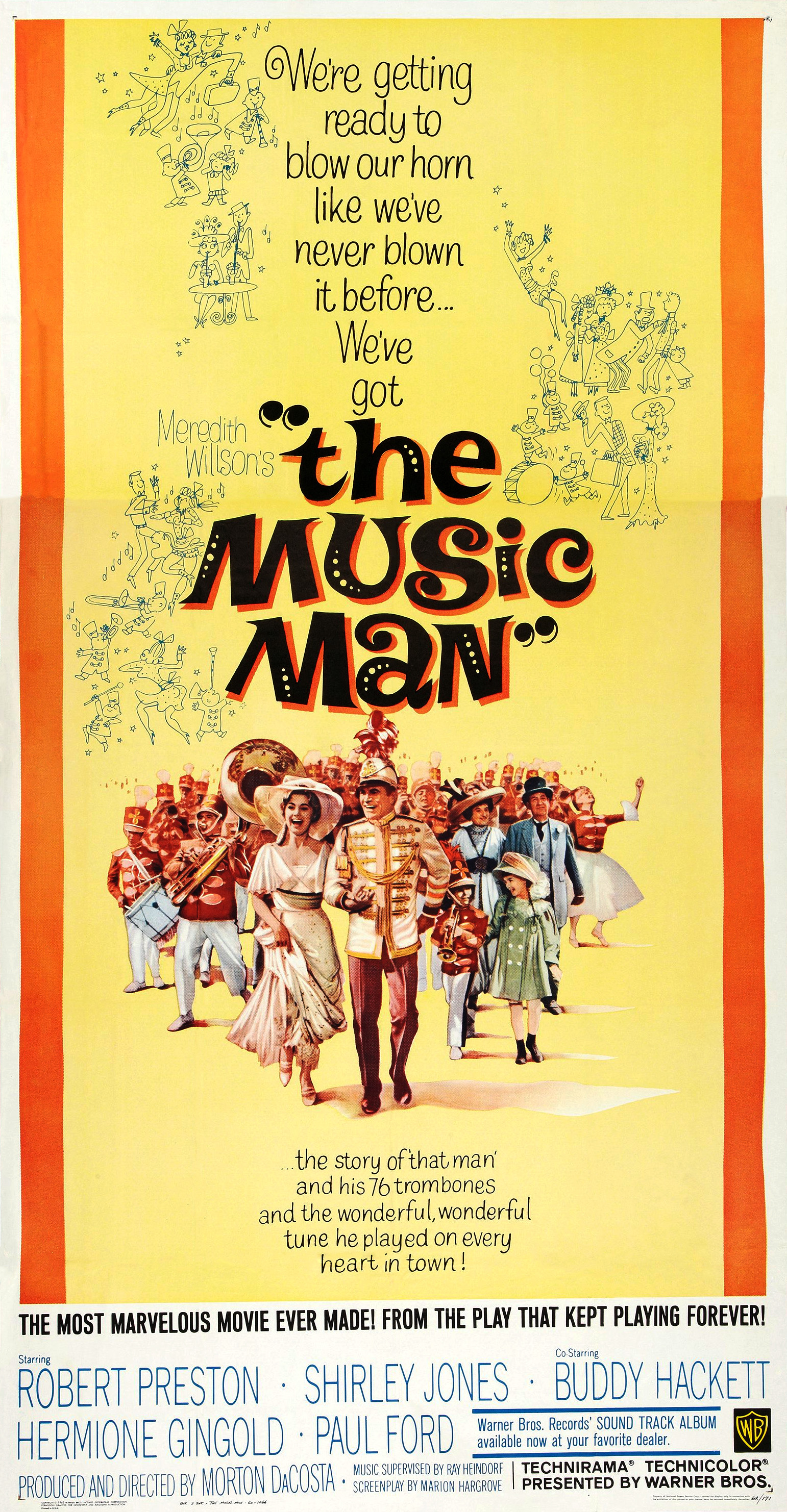
- Theatrical release poster by Bill Gold
- Directed by: Morton DaCosta
- Screenplay by: Marion Hargrove
- Based on: The Music Man; 1957 play by: Meredith Willson; Franklin Lacey
- Produced by: Morton DaCosta
- Starring: Robert Preston; Shirley Jones; Buddy Hackett; Hermione Gingold; Paul Ford
- Cinematography: Robert Burks
- Edited by: William H. Ziegler
- Music by: Meredith Willson; Ray Heindorf
- Distributed by: Warner Bros. Pictures
- Release date: June 19, 1962
- Running time: 151 minutes
- Country: United States
- Language: English
- Box office: $15 million

The Music Man is a 1962 American musical film directed and produced by Morton DaCosta, based on Meredith Willson's 1957 Broadway musical of the same name, which DaCosta also directed. Robert Preston reprises the title role from the stage version, starring alongside Shirley Jones, Buddy Hackett, Hermione Gingold, Ronny Howard, and Paul Ford.

Released by Warner Bros. Pictures on June 19, 1962, the film was one of the biggest hits of the year and was widely acclaimed by critics. It was nominated for six Academy Awards, including Best Picture, with composer Ray Heindorf winning Best Music, Scoring of Music, Adaptation or Treatment. The film also won the Golden Globe Award for Best Motion Picture – Musical or Comedy, and Preston and Jones were both nominated in their respective acting categories. In 2005, the film was selected for preservation in the United States National Film Registry by the Library of Congress as being "culturally, historically, or aesthetically significant".

== Plot ==
In July, 1912, con man Professor Harold Hill arrives in fictional River City, Iowa, to swindle the citizens. A few traveling salesmen in the area have heard about Hill, who is known for a ploy in which he gets townspeople to pay to create boys' marching bands, with Hill faking his musical expertise and skipping town once he has their money.

Hill discovers that River City is the home of his former associate Marcellus Washburn; with Marcellus's help, Hill incites a moral panic among River City's parents that their boys are being seduced into sin by the town's new pool table. He suggests that a marching band will keep young boys out of trouble. Anticipating that Marian Paroo, the town's librarian and piano teacher, is suspicious of his motives, Hill sets out to seduce her. Also suspicious is Mayor Shinn, owner of the billiard parlor, who orders the school board to obtain Hill's credentials. When they attempt to do so, Hill distracts them by teaching them to sing as a barbershop quartet. Thereafter, Hill tricks them into breaking into four-part harmony whenever they ask for his credentials.

Hill's wooing of Marian, who mistrusts him, has little effect, though he succeeds in winning the admiration of her mother and befriends her unhappy younger brother, Winthrop. When Marian discovers that Hill's claim to being a graduate of Gary Conservatory is a lie, she attempts to expose him, but is interrupted by the arrival of the Wells Fargo wagon, delivering the band instruments that the townspeople had ordered. When Winthrop, after years of moody withdrawal, joins in the townspeople's singing and speaks effusively about his new cornet, which had arrived in the wagon, Marian changes her mind about Hill. Hill tells the boys to learn to play via the Think System, in which they simply have to think of a tune over and over and will know how to play it without ever practicing on their instruments.

Meeting Marian at the traditional footbridge—the first time she has ever been there with a man—Hill learns that she knows of his deception but did not tell because she is in love with him. He is about to leave town when Charlie Cowell, a disgruntled anvil salesman who was run out of Brighton, Illinois, because Hill had conned the townspeople there, comes to River City and exposes Hill. Sought by an angry mob and pressed to leave town by Marcellus and Marian, Hill realizes he is in love with Marian and does not want to leave.

Hill is captured by the mob and brought before a town meeting to be tarred and feathered. Marian defends Hill; the townspeople, reminded of how he has brought so many of them together, relent. Mayor Shinn reminds the townspeople how much money Hill has taken with no apparent result. When he demands to know "Where's the band?" Hill is saved by the town's boys, who play Beethoven's Minuet in G. Although their technique is awful, the parents are enthralled. As the boys march out of the town hall, they are suddenly transformed in the townspeople's imagination into a band, playing and marching with perfection, led by Hill, much to Charlie's shock and clumsiness via hurting his toe by dropping his anvil case.

== Cast ==
- Robert Preston as Harold Hill
- Shirley Jones as Marian Paroo
- Buddy Hackett as Marcellus Washburn
- Hermione Gingold as Eulalie Mackechnie Shinn
- Paul Ford as Mayor George Shinn
- Pert Kelton as Mrs. Paroo
- The Buffalo Bills as the School Board:
  - Bill Spangenberg as Olin Britt
  - Wayne "Scotty" Ward as Oliver Hix
  - Al Shea as Ewart Dunlop
  - Vern Reed as Jacey Squires
- Timmy Everett as Tommy Djilas
- Susan Luckey as Zaneeta Shinn
- Ronny Howard as Winthrop Paroo
- Harry Hickox as Charlie Cowell, the anvil salesman
- Charles Lane as Constable Locke
- The Pick-a-Little Ladies:
  - Mary Wickes as Mrs. Squires
  - Peggy Mondo as Ethel Toffelmier
  - Sara Seegar as Maud Dunlop
  - Adnia Rice as Alma Hix
- Jesslyn Fax as Avis Grubb
- Monique Vermont as Amaryllis
- Ronnie Dapo as Norbert Smith (uncredited)
- Percy Helton as Train Conductor (uncredited)
- Max Showalter as Salesman on the Train (uncredited)

=== Casting notes ===
The members of the original Broadway cast who appear in the film are Robert Preston (Harold Hill), Pert Kelton (Mrs. Paroo), the Buffalo Bills (the School Board), Peggy Mondo (Ethel Toffelmier), and Adina Rice (Alma Hix). Paul Ford (Mayor Shinn) was a replacement during the original run. Susan Luckey (Zaneeta Shinn) and Harry Hickox (Charlie Cowell) both reprise their roles from the first national tour, while Monique Vermont (Amaryllis) was a replacement.

Although Preston scored a great success in the original stage version of the show, he was not the first choice for the film version, mostly because he was not a major box-office star. Jack L. Warner was notorious for wanting to film stage musicals with bigger stars than the ones who played the roles onstage. James Cagney and Bing Crosby were offered the role of Harold Hill, but both turned it down. Warner also offered the part to Cary Grant, but he declined, saying, "Nobody could do that role as well as Bob Preston." Grant also told Warner that he would not bother to see the film unless Preston was in it. Warner then intended Frank Sinatra for the Harold Hill role, but was finally foiled by Meredith Willson, who reminded Warner that the author-composer had cast approval written into his contract, and threatened to cancel the entire project unless Preston played the lead.

Late in 1960, long before the film went into production, Robert Preston offered his casting choice: "I've repeatedly told studio officials there's no point in doing it without Doris Day—and I'm pretty sure they agree."

== Songs ==
Warner Bros. Records issued the soundtrack album in both stereophonic and monaural versions.

Source: AllMusic

1. "Main Title/Rock Island" – Orchestra, the Traveling Salesmen
2. "Iowa Stubborn" – The Ensemble
3. "Ya Got Trouble" – Robert Preston, the Ensemble
4. "Piano Lesson" – Shirley Jones, Pert Kelton
5. "Goodnight, My Someone" – Jones
6. "Ya Got Trouble/Seventy-Six Trombones" – Preston, the Ensemble
7. "Sincere" – Buffalo Bills
8. "Pick-a-Little, Talk-a-Little" – Hermione Gingold, Mary Wickes, Peggy Mondo, Sara Seegar, Adnia Rice
9. "The Sadder but Wiser Girl" – Preston, Buddy Hackett
10. "Marian The Librarian" – Preston
11. "Gary, Indiana" – Preston, Kelton
12. "Being in Love" – Jones
13. "The Wells Fargo Wagon" – The Ensemble
14. "Lida Rose/Will I Ever Tell You?" – Jones, the Buffalo Bills
15. "Gary, Indiana" (reprise) – Ronny Howard, Kelton, Jones
16. "Lida Rose" (reprise) – Buffalo Bills
17. "Shipoopi" – Hackett, the Ensemble
18. "Till There Was You" – Jones
19. "It's You" – Buffalo Bills (does not appear on soundtrack album)
20. "Goodnight, My Someone"/"Seventy-six Trombones" (reprises) – Jones, Preston
21. "Till There Was You" (reprise) – Preston
22. "Seventy-Six Trombones" (reprise and finale) – The Ensemble

During the recording of the soundtrack musical numbers in late 1961 and early 1962 to which the cast would later lip-sync on the soundstage, some sessions included work on the song "Chicken Fat", a.k.a. President Kennedy's "Youth Fitness Song", performed by Preston.

== Production ==
Unusual for a musical film at the time, Morton DaCosta, who had directed the stage version of the musical, not only directed the film, but produced it, as well, ensuring that the film was faithful to the show. In addition to Preston, actress Pert Kelton and the Buffalo Bills also reprised their stage roles.

All of the show's songs were retained in their full versions with three exceptions: The opening "Rock Island" was slightly altered and edited; the middle verse of "My White Knight" was retained, but the remainder of the song was replaced with a new song by Willson, "Being in Love"; "It's You" was initially heard as incidental music and later sung by the school board in abbreviated form in the fairground scene.

Several phrases were altered for the film, as the writers felt they were too obscurely Midwestern to appeal to a broader audience; the minced oath "Jeely kly!" is Tommy Djilas's catchphrase in the play, while in the film he exclaims, "Great honk!" The word "shipoopi," which has no meaning and was concocted by Willson for the original Broadway show, was left unchanged.

When Amaryllis plays "Goodnight My Someone", she is playing the keys C, G, and E on the piano, but the notes actually heard are B, F#, and D#. Marian sings the song in B major.

Shirley Jones was pregnant while the film was in production. When Preston and she embraced during the footbridge scene, the baby—who would be born on January 4 and would be named Patrick Cassidy—kicked Preston. The costume designers had to adjust her dresses several times to conceal her pregnancy.

For the final parade scene, Jack L. Warner selected the University of Southern California's marching band, the Spirit of Troy. Many junior high school students from Southern California were also included, forming the majority of the band. About eight hours of shooting over two days were needed to film the scene. All the musical instruments for the production were specially made for the film by the Richards Music Corp. (RMC). Each instrument made for the movie carries this engraving, "Made by RMC for the filming of Meredith Willson's 'The Music Man' by Warner Bros."

== Release ==
The film had its premiere in Mason City, Iowa, the home town of Meredith Willson, during the North Iowa Band Festival on June 19, 1962.

== Reception ==
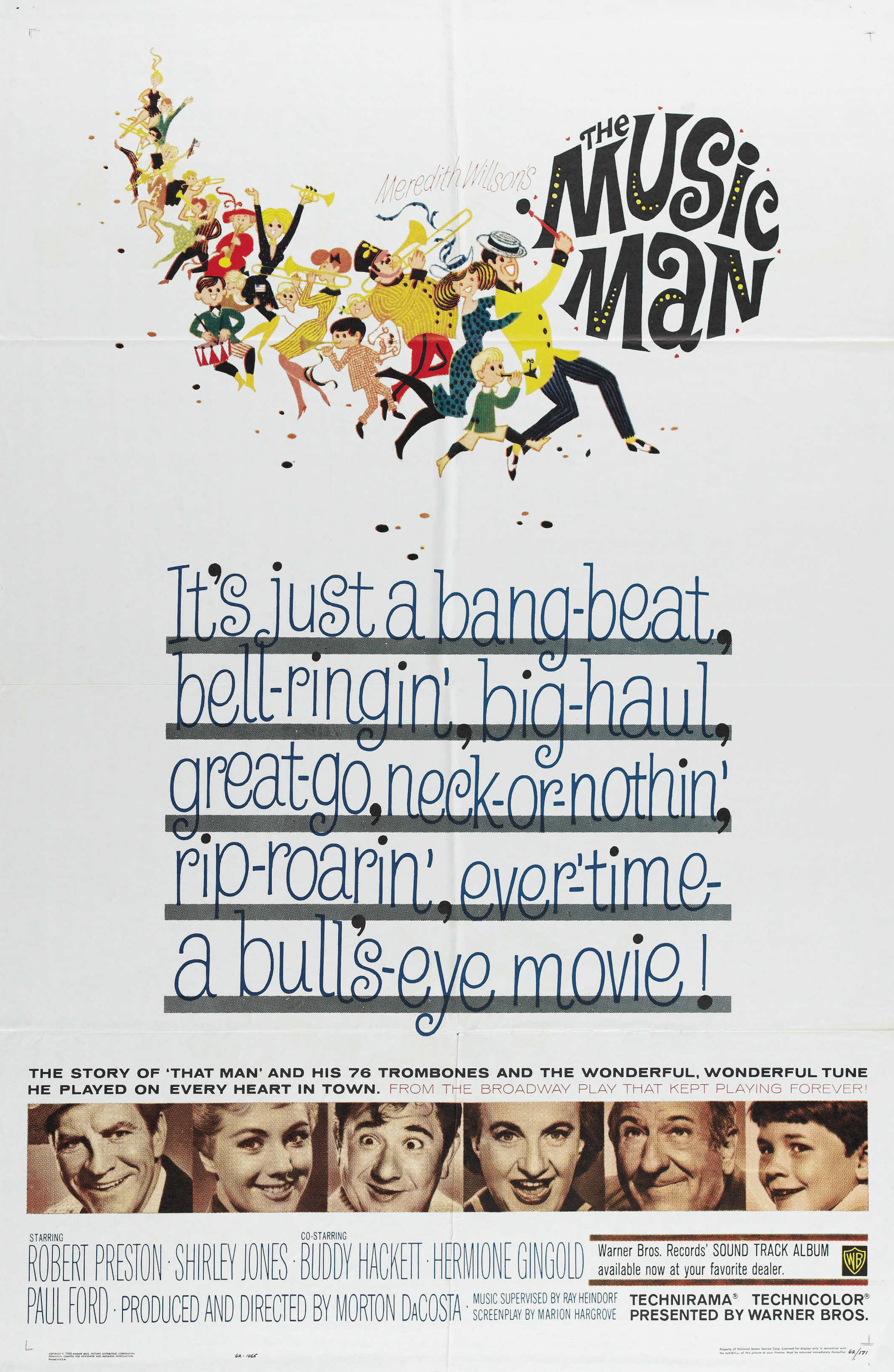
Alternate theatrical release poster

The film received positive reviews and grossed $14,953,846 at the box office, earning $8.1 million in US theatrical rentals. It was the third-highest-grossing film of 1962.

Bosley Crowther in The New York Times wrote, "It's here, and the rich, ripe roundness of it, the lush amalgam of the many elements of successful American show business that Mr. Willson brought together on the stage, has been preserved and appropriately made rounder and richer through the magnitude of film."

Robert Landry of Variety wrote: "Call this a triumph, perhaps a classic, of corn, smalltown nostalgia and American love of a parade...DaCosta's use of several of the original Broadway cast players is thoroughly vindicated...But the only choice for the title role, Robert Preston, is the big proof of showmanship in the casting. Warners might have secured bigger screen names, but it is impossible to imagine any of them matching Preston's authority, backed by 883 stage performances."

Stanley Kauffmann of The New Republic wrote, "Robert Preston is a likable man whose likableness let him give one of the best phony performances of the postwar era, in that phony musical The Music Man."

Leo Charney reviewing for AllMovie wrote that the film "is among the best movie musicals, transforming Meredith Willson's Broadway hit into an energetic slice of Americana. Robert Preston's virtuoso portrayal of con man Harold Hill transfers from the stage (despite the studio's nervousness about casting no-name Preston), and the result is one of the most explosively vital performances in any movie musical."

In 2005, The Music Man was selected for preservation in the United States National Film Registry by the Library of Congress as being "culturally, historically, or aesthetically significant".

The film is recognized by American Film Institute in these lists:

- 2004: AFI's 100 Years...100 Songs:
  - "Seventy-Six Trombones" – nominated
- 2006: AFI's Greatest Movie Musicals – nominated

=== Accolades ===
The film won one award at the 35th Academy Awards and was nominated for five more.

| Award | Category | Year | Nominee | Result |
|---|---|---|---|---|
| Academy Awards | Best Picture | 1963 | Morton DaCosta | Nominated |
| Academy Awards | Best Art Direction (Color) | 1963 | Paul Groesse, George James Hopkins | Nominated |
| Academy Awards | Best Costume Design (Color) | 1963 | Dorothy Jeakins | Nominated |
| Academy Awards | Best Film Editing | 1963 | William H. Ziegler | Nominated |
| Academy Awards | Best Musical Score (Adaptation or Treatment) | 1963 | Ray Heindorf | Won |
| Academy Awards | Best Sound Recording | 1963 | George Groves | Nominated |
| Golden Globe Awards | Best Motion Picture – Musical | 1963 | —N/a | Won |
| Golden Globe Awards | Best Director | 1963 | Morton DaCosta | Nominated |
| Golden Globe Awards | Best Actor – Motion Picture Musical or Comedy | 1963 | Robert Preston | Nominated |
| Golden Globe Awards | Best Actress – Motion Picture Comedy or Musical | 1963 | Shirley Jones | Nominated |
| Golden Globe Awards | Best Original Score | 1963 | Meredith Willson | Nominated |
| Directors Guild of America Awards | Outstanding Directing – Feature Film | 1963 | Morton DaCosta | Nominated |
| Writers Guild of America Awards | Best Written Musical | 1963 | Marion Hargrove | Won |

== Comic-book adaptation ==
- Dell Movie Classic: The Music Man (January 1963)

== See also ==
- The Flim-Flam Man (1967)
- "Marge vs. the Monorail", an episode of The Simpsons, is largely an homage to The Music Man.
- List of American films of 1962
- Elinor Glyn, a romance novelist of whom Marian disapproves
