= Goodnight, Ladies =

Song attributed to Edwin Pearce Christy

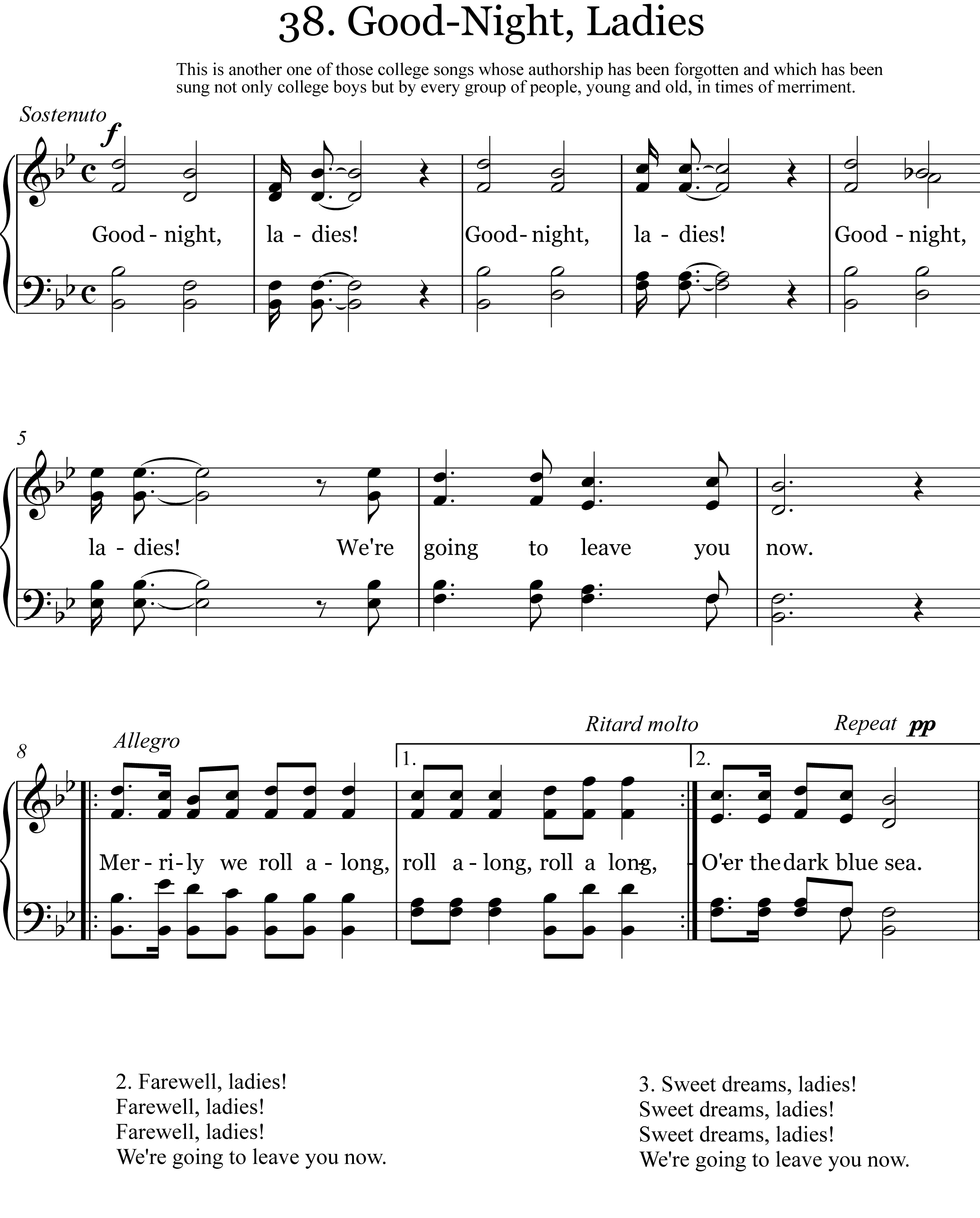
Sheet music version

"Goodnight, Ladies" is a folk song attributed to Edwin Pearce Christy, originally intended to be sung during a minstrel show. Drawing from an 1847 song by Christy entitled "Farewell, Ladies", the song as known today was first published on May 16, 1867.

== Lyrics ==
VERSE I: Goodnight, ladies! Goodnight, ladies! Goodnight, ladies! We're going to leave you now!

CHORUS: Merrily we roll along, roll along, roll along. Merrily we roll along, o'er the dark blue sea.

VERSE II: Farewell, ladies! Farewell, ladies! Farewell, ladies! We're going to leave you now!

CHORUS

VERSE III: Sweet dreams, ladies! Sweet dreams, ladies! Sweet dreams, ladies! We're going to leave you now!

CHORUS

Note: the "Merrily We Roll Along" chorus has the same melody as "Mary Had A Little Lamb".

== Notable uses ==
The song being performed at the end of the 1929 cartoon Finding His Voice

Charles Ives quoted the song in A Symphony: New England Holidays (1897–1913): I. Washington's Birthday, towards the end of the movement.

The 1957 musical The Music Man by Meredith Willson features the song in counterpoint with the original composition "Pick-a-Little, Talk-a-Little."

Bing Crosby included the song in a medley on his album 101 Gang Songs (1961).

Lou Reed included a version of the song at the end of side two of his album Transformer (1972).

The song appears in the early part of the movie The Four Feathers (2002).

== See also ==
- "I've Been Working on the Railroad"
- "Merrily We Roll Along"
- "Nice One Cyril"
