= Iowa Stubborn =

Song from the 1957 musical The Music Man

Song

from the album The Music Man
- Published: 1957
- Songwriter: Meredith Willson

"Iowa Stubborn" is a song by Meredith Willson from his 1957 musical The Music Man. It is the first sung number in the show, following the show's unusual spoken opening, "Rock Island". The piece is sung in a schottische or "soft-shoe" rhythm. In the lyrics, the reserved and stoic citizens of River City, Iowa seek to persuade a visitor (who turns out to be the musical's protagonist, Professor Harold Hill) to "give Iowa a try." They sing of their "chip-on-the-shoulder attitude we've never been without that we recall. ... And we're so by God stubborn we can stand touchin' noses for a week at a time, and never see eye to eye."

== References to Iowa and Iowan characteristics ==
Wilson lived in Iowa until he was 16 years old, and in his autobiography, he describes the concept of Iowa stubbornness this way: "My brother is a very smart man in the industrial field. Light aggregate concrete. In fact, he is an expert. I don't mind telling that to you, but it's the first time I've ever told it to him. That's what we call Iowa-stubborn."

Eight Iowa cities are named near the end of the song, in the following order:

1. Dubuque
2. Des Moines
3. Davenport
4. Marshalltown
5. Mason City (Willson's birthplace)
6. Keokuk
7. Ames
8. Clear Lake

The song has been praised for representing both the service-oriented friendliness and the irrefragable conservativism characteristic of Iowans.
