= The Music Man =

Musical by Meredith Willson

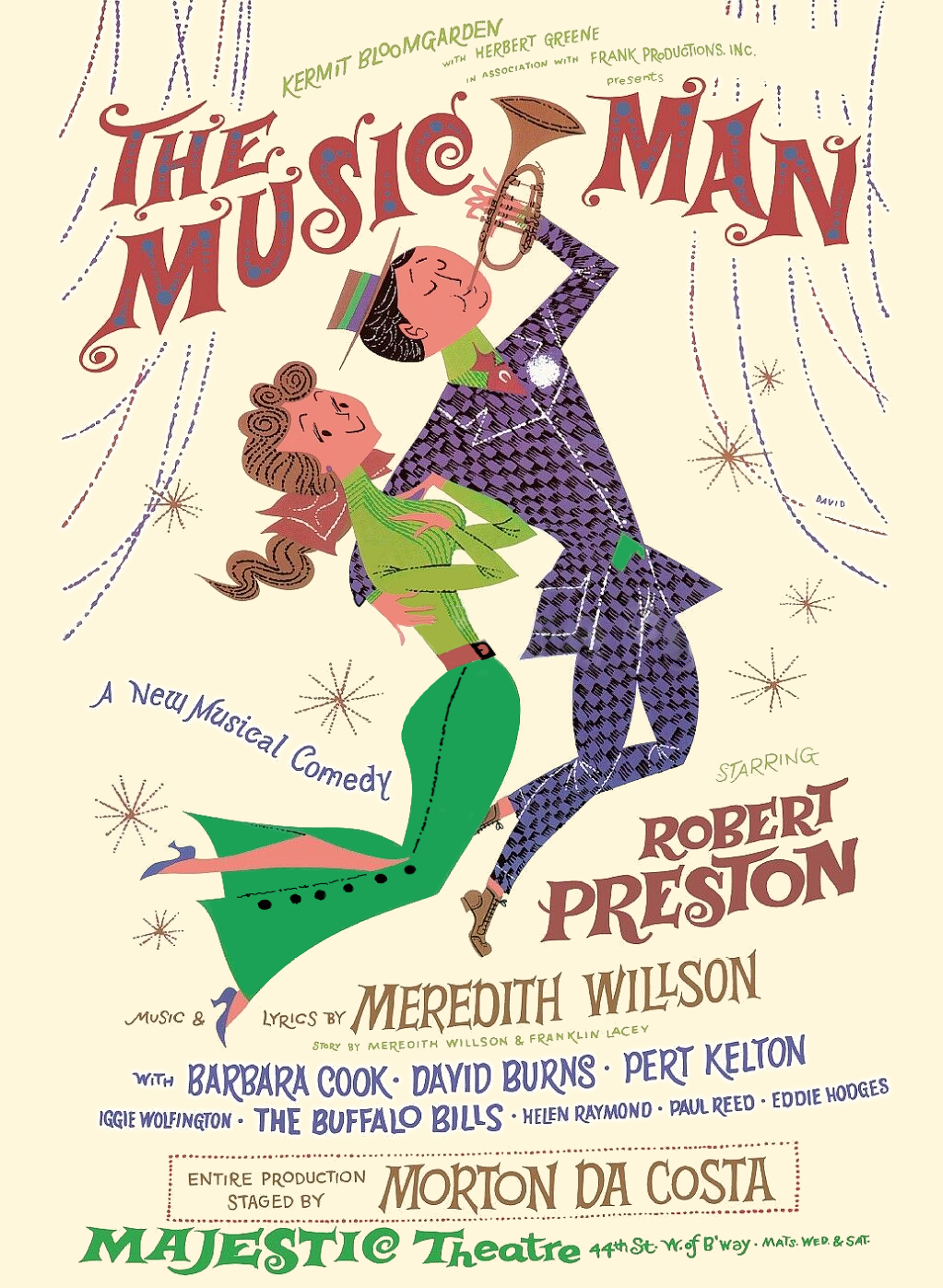
- Original Broadway poster
- Music: Meredith Willson
- Lyrics: Meredith Willson
- Book: Meredith Willson; Franklin Lacey
- Productions: 1957 Broadway; 1961 West End; 1980 Broadway revival 2000 Broadway revival 2022 Broadway revival
- Awards: Tony Award for Best Musical

The Music Man is a musical with book, music, and lyrics by Meredith Willson, based on a story by Willson and Franklin Lacey. The plot concerns con man Harold Hill, who poses as a boys' band organizer and leader. He sells band instruments and uniforms to naïve Midwestern townsfolk, promising to train the members of the new band. Harold is no musician, however, and plans to skip town without giving any music lessons. Prim librarian and piano teacher Marian sees through him, but when Harold helps her younger brother overcome his lisp and social awkwardness, Marian begins to fall in love with him. He risks being caught to win her heart.

In 1957, the show became a hit on Broadway, winning five Tony Awards, including Best Musical, and running for 1,375 performances. The cast album won the first Grammy Award for Best Musical Theater Album and spent 245 weeks on the Billboard charts. The show's success led to Broadway and West End revivals, a popular 1962 film adaptation and a 2003 television adaptation. The Music Man is frequently produced by both professional and amateur theater companies and is a popular choice for high school and college productions.

== Background ==
Meredith Willson was inspired by his boyhood in Mason City, Iowa, to write and compose his first musical, The Music Man. Willson began developing this theme in his 1948 memoir, And There I Stood With My Piccolo. He first approached producers Cy Feuer and Ernest Martin for a television special, and then Metro-Goldwyn-Mayer producer Jesse L. Lasky. After these and other unsuccessful attempts, Willson invited Franklin Lacey to help him edit and simplify the libretto. At this time, Willson considered eliminating a long piece of dialogue about the serious trouble facing River City parents. Realizing that it sounded like a lyric, he transformed it into the patter song "Ya Got Trouble". Willson wrote about his trials and tribulations in getting the show to Broadway in his 1958 book But He Doesn't Know the Territory.

The character Marian Paroo was inspired by Marian Seeley of Provo, Utah, who met Willson during World War II, when Seeley was a medical records librarian. In the original production (and the film), the School Board was played by the 1950 International Quartet Champions of the Society for the Preservation and Encouragement of Barber Shop Quartet Singing in America (SPEBSQSA), (Note: Although SPEBSQSA retains its full name for legal purposes, it is now known by its decades-old official alternate name, Barbershop Harmony Society.) the Buffalo Bills. Robert Preston claimed that he got the role of Harold Hill despite his limited singing range because, when he went to audition, they were having the men sing "Trouble". The producers felt it would be the most difficult song to sing, but with his acting background, it was the easiest for Preston.

Originally titled The Silver Triangle, early versions of the story focused on a partially paralyzed boy, Jim Paroo, whom the townspeople wanted to consign to an institution for children with disabilities. The plot revolved around Harold Hill finding a musical instrument that the boy could play: a triangle. In some drafts, Jim was also nonverbal. Willson had an epiphany while reflecting on the "Wells Fargo Wagon" song, in which a lisping youngster sang one of the verses. "Here's this kid who isn't even identified," recalled Willson in his 1957 memoir. "Just a lisping kid but you get hit with some magic anyhow. Imagine if the lisping kid were somebody we know – some character in the story." Willson suddenly realized that this youngster could be the child with the disability. In the finished book, Winthrop Paroo is almost silent and hesitates to speak because of a lisp, but unexpectedly bursts into song when the Wells Fargo wagon arrives with his new cornet.

== Productions ==
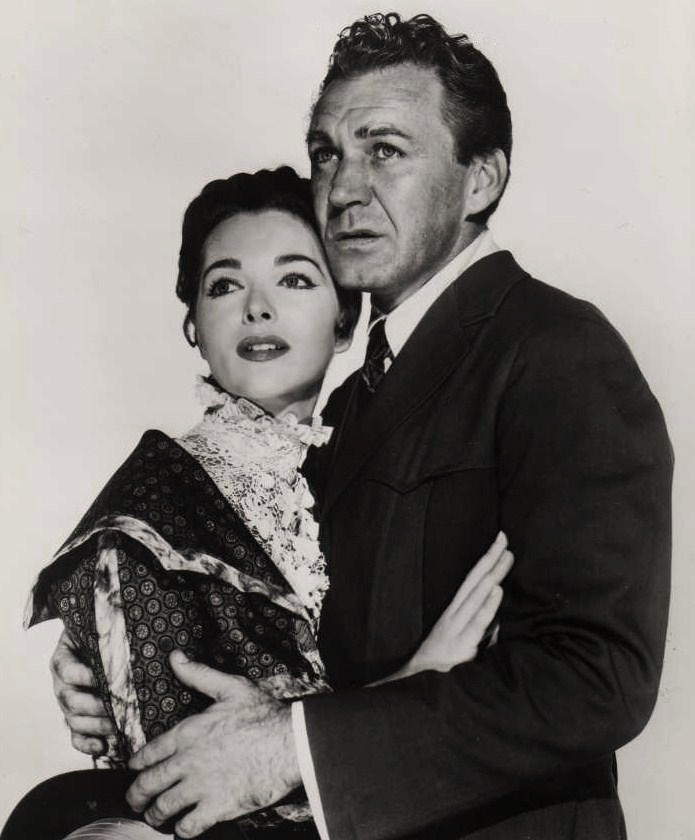
Weldon and Tucker in the National Tour, 1960

=== Original Broadway production ===
After years of development, a change of producers, almost forty songs (twenty-two were cut), and more than forty drafts, the original Broadway production was produced by Kermit Bloomgarden, directed by Morton DaCosta and choreographed by Onna White. The Music Man opened on December 19, 1957, at the Majestic Theatre. It played at the Majestic for nearly three years before transferring to The Broadway Theatre and completing its 1,375 performance run there on April 15, 1961. The original cast included Robert Preston (who reprised his role in the 1962 screen adaptation) as Harold Hill, Barbara Cook as Marian, Eddie Hodges as Winthrop, Pert Kelton as Mrs. Paroo, Iggie Wolfington as Marcellus Washburn and David Burns as Mayor Shinn.

In January 1959, Preston left the show and was replaced by Eddie Albert for 18 months. Preston returned for two weeks In June 1960, until his successor, Bert Parks, could replace him. Parks finished the Broadway run while Preston was busy filming the screen version. Paul Ford was a replacement for David Burns as Mayor Shinn, later reprising the role in the film version.

Howard Bay designed the sets. Don Walker orchestrated the score. The musical won five Tony Awards, including Best Musical, winning in the same year that West Side Story was nominated for the award. Preston, Cook and Burns also won. Liza Redfield became the first woman to be the full-time conductor of a Broadway pit orchestra when she assumed the role of music director for the original production's final year of performances beginning in May 1960. The long-running American tour began in 1958, starring Forrest Tucker as Hill and Joan Weldon as Marian.

=== First Australian and UK productions ===
The first Australian production ran from March 5, 1960, to July 30, 1960, at the Princess Theatre in Melbourne, and at the Tivoli Theatre in Sydney from December 13, 1960, to February 4, 1961. The first UK production opened at Bristol Hippodrome, transferring to London's West End at the Adelphi Theatre on March 16, 1961, starring Van Johnson, Patricia Lambert, C. Denier Warren, Ruth Kettlewell and Dennis Waterman. It ran for 395 performances at the Adelphi.

=== Subsequent productions ===
A two-week revival at New York City Center ran in June 1965, directed by Gus Schirmer Jr. and starring Bert Parks as Harold. Doro Merande and Sandy Duncan played, respectively, Eulalie and Zaneeta Shinn. In 1987, a Chinese translation of the musical was staged at Beijing's Central Opera Theater.

A US tour, directed and choreographed by Michael Kidd, ended at City Center, where it played for 8 previews and 21 regular performances from May to June 1980. The cast included Dick Van Dyke as Hill, Meg Bussert as Marian, Christian Slater as Winthrop, Carol Arthur as Mrs. Paroo, and Iggie Wolfington (who played Marcellus in the 1957 production) as Mayor Shinn.

New York City Opera staged a revival from February to April 1988, directed by Arthur Masella and choreographed by Marcia Milgrom Dodge, starring Bob Gunton as Hill, with Muriel Costa-Greenspon as Eulalie and James Billings as Marcellus.

A Broadway revival, directed and choreographed by Susan Stroman, opened on April 27, 2000, at the Neil Simon Theatre, where it ran for 699 performances and 22 previews. The cast included Craig Bierko (making his Broadway debut) as Hill and Rebecca Luker as Marian. Robert Sean Leonard and Eric McCormack portrayed Hill later in the run. The production was nominated for eight Tony Awards but did not win any. In 2008, there was a revival at the Chichester Festival Theatre, England, starring Brian Conley as Hill and Scarlett Strallen as Marian.

In 2019, a semi-staged concert production at the Kennedy Center starred Norm Lewis as Harold, Jessie Mueller as Marian, Rosie O'Donnell as Mrs. Paroo, John Cariani as Marcellus, Veanne Cox as Eulalie, Mark Linn-Baker as Mayor Shinn (a role he reprised on Broadway in 2022), and David Pittu as Charlie.

=== 2022 Broadway revival ===
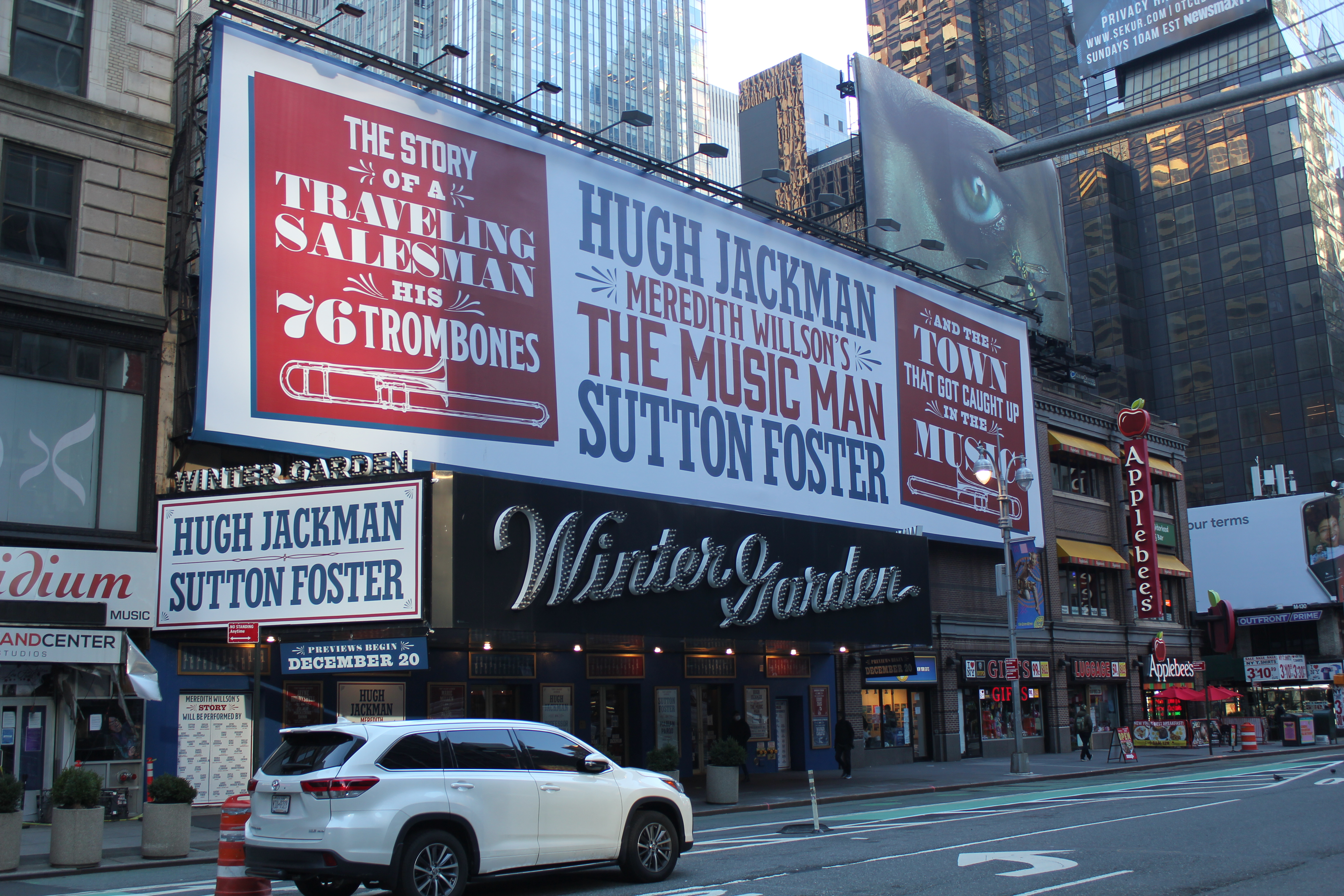
Branding of the 2022 Broadway revival, as seen on the Winter Garden Theatre

A Broadway revival began previews on December 20, 2021, and opened on February 10, 2022, at the Winter Garden Theatre. The production starred Hugh Jackman as Harold and Sutton Foster as Marian with Jefferson Mays as the Mayor, Jayne Houdyshell as Mrs. Shinn, Shuler Hensley as Marcellus, Marie Mullen as Mrs. Paroo, Benjamin Pajak as Winthrop, Remy Auberjonois as Charlie Cowell, Phillip Boykin as Olin Britt and Eddie Korbich as Jacey Squires. It was produced by Kate Horton, Barry Diller, Evan McGill, and David Geffen and directed by Jerry Zaks, with choreography by Warren Carlyle. It features sets and costumes by Santo Loquasto, lighting by Brian MacDevitt, and sound by Scott Lehrer. The production was set to open in 2020 but was delayed due to the COVID-19 pandemic. It suspended performances from December 28, 2021, through January 5, 2022, after Jackman tested positive for COVID-19. The production closed on January 15, 2023.

The production was a success at the box office, taking in $3.5 million in ticket sales during the week of March 22, 2022, more than any show since the pandemic began. Critical reaction was mixed: on the negative side, Jesse Green, in The New York Times, declared the revival, "flat" and "old-fashioned". He criticized Jackman's "smart but strangely inward performance" and felt that Foster's witty and front-facing performance was compromised by her vocal miscasting. Johnny Oleksinski of the New York Post described the production as a "let-down", writing, "Sometimes the show is dark and moody, determined not to have too much fun with a story about a con artist who wins in the end despite his misdeeds. At others, it's ... painfully corny". Frank Scheck of The Hollywood Reporter gave the production a lukewarm review, calling Jackman "neither a great singer nor a particularly accomplished dancer" and commenting that Foster's "voice doesn’t have the crystalline beauty of such predecessors as Barbara Cook and Shirley Jones, and many of the songs aren’t really suited for her". He concluded, however, that "the show ironically feels urgently timely." On the positive side, in Variety, Marilyn Stasio gave the production a rave review, praising all the performances, direction and designs, and calling it "vintage Broadway, but gussied up in grand, glorious style". It was nominated for six Tony Awards, including Best Revival of a Musical, but it did not win any. A special Theatre World Award for "Outstanding Ensemble" was presented to the 21 cast members making their Broadway debuts in the revival.

An official cast recording was released on September 23, 2022. In the fall 2022 fundraising for Broadway Cares/Equity Fights AIDS, The Music Man broke the Red Bucket fundraising record by raising $2,002,612 toward the charity.

== Synopsis ==
=== Act I ===
In the early summer of 1912, aboard a train leaving Rock Island, Illinois, (Note: Rock Island is the departure point in the script of the musical; in the film adaptation, the reference was changed to Brighton, Illinois, the hometown of Willson's mother.) Charlie Cowell and other traveling salesmen debate whether modern conveniences are making their profession more difficult. "Professor" Harold Hill is discussed as one whose sales skills make him immune from such changes ("Rock Island"). Charlie says that Hill is a con man who promises to form boys' marching bands, then skips town after taking payments for instruments and uniforms. Upon the train's arrival in River City, Iowa, a passenger leaves the train with a suitcase labeled "Professor Harold Hill".

After townspeople of River City describe their reserved, "chip-on-the-shoulder attitude" ("Iowa Stubborn"), Harold sees his old friend and shill, Marcellus Washburn, who has "gone legit" and now lives in the town. Marcellus tells Harold that the only person who might expose him is the only trained musician in town, Marian Paroo, the librarian who gives piano lessons. He also informs Hill that a new pool table was just delivered to the town's local billiard parlor so, to launch his scheme, Harold convinces River City parents of the "trouble" that can come from a pool table in the community ("Ya Got Trouble"). Harold follows Marian home, attempting to flirt with her, but she ignores him. Marian gives a piano lesson to a little girl named Amaryllis while arguing with her widowed mother about her high "standards where men are concerned"; she mentions the man who followed her home ("Piano Lesson/If You Don't Mind My Saying So"). Marian's self-conscious 10-year-old brother Winthrop arrives home. Amaryllis, who secretly likes Winthrop but teases him about his lisp, asks Marian to whom she should say goodnight on the evening star, since she doesn't have a sweetheart. Marian tells her to just say goodnight to her "someone" ("Goodnight, My Someone").

The next day, bumbling Mayor Shinn and his overbearing wife Eulalie MacKecknie Shinn lead the festivities for Independence Day at the high school gym ("Columbia, the Gem of the Ocean") but are interrupted by a firecracker set off by troublemaker Tommy Djilas. Harold takes the stage and announces to the townspeople that he will prevent "sin and corruption" from the presence of the pool table by forming a boys' band ("Ya Got Trouble [reprise]/Seventy-Six Trombones"). Mayor Shinn, who owns the billiard parlor, tells the bickering school board to get Harold's credentials, but Harold gets them to sing as a Barbershop Quartet to distract them ("Ice Cream/Sincere"). Harold also sets up Zaneeta, the mayor's eldest daughter, with Tommy, and persuades Tommy to work as his assistant. After another rejection by Marian, Harold is determined to win her ("The Sadder But Wiser Girl"). The town ladies are very excited about the band and the ladies' dance committee that Harold plans to form. He mentions Marian, and they imply (falsely, it turns out) that she had an affair with a now-deceased miser, who willed the library building to the town but left all the books to Marian. They warn Harold that she advocates "dirty books" by "Chaucer, Rabelais and Balzac" ("Pick-a-Little, Talk-a-Little"). The school board arrives to review Harold's credentials, but he leads them in song and slips away ("Goodnight, Ladies").

The next day, Harold walks into the library to woo Marian in earnest ("Marian the Librarian"). For a moment, she forgets her decorum and dances with Harold and the teenagers. Harold kisses her; when she tries to slap him, she accidentally hits Tommy instead. With Tommy's help, Harold signs up all the boys in town to be in his band, including Winthrop. Mrs. Paroo likes Harold and tries to find out why Marian is not interested. Marian describes her ideal man ("My White Knight", rewritten for the film version as "Being in Love"). She sets out to give Mayor Shinn evidence against Harold that she found in the Indiana State Educational Journal, but they are interrupted by the arrival of the Wells Fargo wagon, which delivers the band instruments ("The Wells Fargo Wagon"). When Winthrop is so happy about his new cornet, and totally abandons his shyness and self-consciousness, Marian begins to see Harold in a new light. She tears the incriminating page out of the Journal before giving the book to Mayor Shinn.

=== Act II ===
The ladies rehearse their classical dance in the school gym while the school board practices their quartet ("It's You") for the ice cream social. Marcellus and the town's teenagers interrupt the ladies' practice, taking over the gym as they dance ("Shipoopi"). Harold grabs Marian to dance with her, and all the teenagers join in. At the end of the dance, the Mayor angrily denounces Tommy's relationship with his daughter. Regarding Winthrop's cornet, Marian later questions Harold about his claim that "you don't have to bother with the notes". He explains that this is what he calls "The Think System", and he arranges to call on Marian to discuss it. The town ladies ask Marian to join their dance committee, since she was "so dear dancing the Shipoopi" with Professor Hill ("Pick-a-Little, Talk-a-Little" [Reprise]). They have reversed their opinions about her books, and they eagerly tell her that "the Professor told us to read those books, and we simply adored them all!"

That night, the school board tries to collect Harold's credentials again, but he gets them to sing again and slips away ("Lida Rose"). Marian, meanwhile, is sitting on her front porch thinking of Harold ("Will I Ever Tell You?"). Winthrop returns home after spending time with Harold and tells Marian and Mrs. Paroo about Harold's hometown ("Gary, Indiana"). As Marian waits alone for Harold, traveling salesman Charlie Cowell enters with evidence against Harold, hoping to tell Mayor Shinn. He only has a few minutes before his train leaves, but stops to flirt with Marian. She delays him so he won't have time to deliver the evidence, eventually kissing him. As the train whistle blows, she pushes him away. Charlie angrily tells Marian that Harold has a girl in "every county in Illinois, and he's taken it from every one of them – and that's 102 counties!"

Harold arrives, and after he reminds her of the untrue rumors he's heard about her, she convinces herself that Charlie invented everything he told her. They agree to meet at the footbridge, where Marian tells him the difference he's made in her life ("Till There Was You"). Marcellus interrupts and tells Harold that the uniforms have arrived. He urges Harold to take the money and run, but Harold refuses to leave, insisting, "I've come up through the ranks... and I'm not resigning without my commission". He returns to Marian, who tells him that she has known that he is a fraud since the third day after he arrived. (Harold earlier claimed to have graduated from the Gary Conservatory in 1905, but Gary, Indiana, was not founded until 1906.) Because she loves him, she gives him the incriminating page out of the Indiana State Educational Journal. She leaves, promising to see him later at the Sociable. With his schemes for the boys' band and Marian proceeding even better than planned, Harold confidently sings "Seventy-Six Trombones". As he overhears Marian singing "Goodnight My Someone", Harold suddenly realizes that he is in love with Marian; he and Marian sing a snatch of each other's songs.

Meanwhile, Charlie Cowell, who has missed his train, arrives at the ice cream social and denounces Harold as a fraud. The townspeople begin an agitated search for Harold. Winthrop is heartbroken and tells Harold that he wishes Harold had never come to River City. But Marian tells Winthrop that she believes everything Harold ever said, for it did come true in the way every kid in town talked and acted that summer. She and Winthrop urge Harold to get away. He chooses to stay and tells Marian that he never really fell in love until he met her ("Till There Was You" [Reprise]). The constable then handcuffs Harold and leads him away.

Mayor Shinn leads a meeting in the high school gym to decide what to do with Harold, asking, "Where's the band? Where's the band?" Marian defends Harold. Tommy enters as a drum major, followed by the boys in uniform with their instruments. Marian urges Harold to lead the River City Boys' Band in Beethoven's Minuet in G. Despite the boys' limited musical ability, the parents in the audience are nonetheless enraptured by the sight of their children playing music. Even Mayor Shinn is won over, and, as the townspeople cheer, Harold is released into Marian's arms ("Finale").

== Music ==
=== Musical numbers ===
Act I

- "Rock Island" – Charlie and Salesmen
- "Iowa Stubborn" – Townspeople
- "(Ya Got) Trouble" – Harold Hill and Townspeople
- "Piano Lesson" – Marian, Mrs. Paroo and Amaryllis
- "Goodnight, My Someone" – Marian
- "Seventy-Six Trombones" – Harold, Boys and Girls
- "Sincere" – Barbershop quartet (Olin, Oliver, Ewart, Jacey)
- "The Sadder-But-Wiser Girl" – Harold and Marcellus
- "Pickalittle (Talk-a-Little)" – Eulalie, Maud, Ethel, Alma, Mrs. Squires and Ladies of River City
- "Goodnight, Ladies" – Quartet
- "Marian The Librarian" – Harold, Boys and Girls
- "My White Knight" – Marian
- "The Wells Fargo Wagon" – Winthrop and Townspeople

Act II

- "It's You" – The Quartet, Eulalie, Maud, Ethel, Alma and Mrs. Squires
- "Shipoopi" – Marcellus, Harold, Marian and townspeople
- "Pickalittle (Talk-a-Little)" (reprise) – Eulalie, Maud, Ethel, Alma, Mrs. Squires and Ladies
- "Lida Rose" – Quartet
- "Will I Ever Tell You" – Marian
- "Gary, Indiana" – Winthrop, Mrs. Paroo, Marian
- "It's You" (reprise) – Townspeople, Boys and Girls
- "Till There Was You" – Marian, Harold
- "Seventy-six Trombones/Goodnight, My Someone" (reprise) – Harold and Marian
- "Till There Was You" (reprise) – Harold
- "Finale" – Company

Notes:
As this musical concerns a marching band, the orchestration for several of the numbers includes band instruments.

"Lida Rose" and "Will I Ever Tell You", sung first separately and then simultaneously, are examples of Broadway counterpoint (songs with separate lyrics and separate melodies that harmonize and are designed to be sung together). Similarly, "Pickalittle" and "Good Night Ladies" are also sung first separately, and then in counterpoint. Willson's counterpoint is lampooned, along with two counterpoint song pairs from Irving Berlin musicals, in the 1959 musical Little Mary Sunshine, where three counterpoint songs are combined: "Playing Croquet," "Swinging" and "How Do You Do?" "Goodnight, My Someone" is the same tune, in waltz time, as the march-tempo "Seventy-six Trombones".

In the 1962 movie, the 1980 and 2000 revivals, and some amateur and regional productions, "Gary, Indiana" is sung in Act 1 by Harold (1962 movie) and Mrs. Paroo (between "Marian the Librarian" and "My White Knight"), with Winthrop singing a reprise of it in Act 2 (with Mrs. Paroo and Marian Paroo in 2000).

== Casts and characters ==
=== Casts ===
Character	Broadway	West End	Broadway revival	Broadway revival	Broadway revival
Character	1957	1961	1980	2000	2022
Prof. Harold Hill	Robert Preston	Van Johnson	Dick Van Dyke	Craig Bierko	Hugh Jackman
Marian Paroo	Barbara Cook	Patricia Lambert	Meg Bussert	Rebecca Luker	Sutton Foster
Marcellus Washburn	Iggie Wolfington	Bernard Spear	Richard Warren Pugh	Max Casella	Shuler Hensley
Mayor Shinn	David Burns	C. Denier Warren	Iggie Wolfington	Paul Benedict	Jefferson Mays
Eulalie Mackecknie Shinn	Helen Raymond	Nan Munro	Jen Jones	Ruth Williamson	Jayne Houdyshell
Mrs. Paroo	Pert Kelton	Ruth Kettlewell	Carol Arthur	Katherine McGrath	Marie Mullen
Winthrop Paroo	Eddie Hodges	Dennis Waterman	Christian Slater	Michael Phelan	Benjamin Pajak

=== Notable replacements ===
==== 2022 Broadway revival ====
- Mayor Shinn: Mark Linn-Baker

=== Main characters ===
Character	Description
Harold Hill	A confidence man who pretends to be a traveling salesman and professor of music
Marian Paroo	The town librarian and part-time piano teacher
Marcellus Washburn	Harold's old friend and former shill, who now lives in River City
Mayor George Shinn	A pompous politician who is suspicious of Hill
Eulalie Mackecknie Shinn	The mayor's wife
Mrs. Paroo	Marian's widowed, Irish immigrant mother
Winthrop Paroo	Marian's shy, younger brother who lisps

=== Secondary characters ===
Character	Description	Original Broadway performer
The School Board (Barbershop Quartet)	Four bickering local businessmen united as singers by Hill (Olin Britt, Oliver Hix, Ewart Dunlop and Jacey Squires)	Bill Spangenberg, Wayne Ward, Al Shea and Vern Reed (The Buffalo Bills)
Pickalittle Ladies	Eulalie's four gossipy friends (Alma Hix, Mrs. Squires, Ethel Toffelmier and Maud Dunlop)	Adnia Rice, Martha Flynn, Peggy Mondo and Elaine Swann
Tommy Djilas	A young man "from the wrong side of town"; secretly dating Zaneeta Shinn	Danny Carroll
Zaneeta Shinn	The mayor's oldest daughter; secretly dating Tommy Djilas	Dusty Worrall
Charlie Cowell	An anvil salesman who tries to expose Hill as a fraud and con man	Paul Reed
Constable Locke	The town peace officer	Carl Nicholas
Amaryllis	Marian's young piano student	Marilyn Siegel

== Setting and popular culture references ==
The Music Man is set in the fictional town of River City, Iowa, in 1912. The town is based in large part on Willson's birthplace, Mason City, Iowa, and many of the musical's characters are based on people that Willson observed in the town. The "river" in River City is probably the Mississippi River near Davenport, Iowa: the Rock Island conductor's announcing "River City, Iowa! Cigarettes illegal in this state" implies crossing the Mississippi from Rock Island, Illinois, into Iowa.

The musical includes numerous references to popular culture of the time. For example, in making his pitch, Harold Hill lists popular musicians and composers: Gilmore, Pat Conway, Giuseppe Creatore, W.C. Handy and John Philip Sousa. Some of the cultural references are anachronistic: "Trouble" contains references to both Captain Billy's Whiz Bang, a monthly humor magazine that did not begin publication until October 1919, and the nonalcoholic "near-beer" Bevo, which was first brewed in 1916. In addition, Rafael Méndez (referred to by Hill as "O'Mendez," a great "Irish" trumpeter) was six years old in 1912. A book by Cary Ginell, Watch Your Frazolagy! (2023) examines references in the musical.

== Recordings ==
The first recording of "Till There Was You" was released before the original cast album version. Promotional copies of the 45 rpm single, Capitol P3847, were released on November 26, 1957, even before the Broadway production had premiered. Produced by Nelson Riddle, it featured his orchestra and 17-year-old vocalist Sue Raney.

The original cast recording was released by Capitol Records on January 20, 1958, in stereophonic & monaural versions and held the #1 spot on the Billboard charts for twelve weeks, remaining on the charts for a total of 245 weeks. The cast album was awarded "Best Original Cast Album" at the first Grammy Awards ceremony in 1958 and was inducted in 1998 as a Grammy Hall of Fame Award winner.

In 1959, jazz composer and arranger Jimmy Giuffre released Jimmy Giuffre and His Music Men Play The Music Man, consisting of jazz arrangements of tunes from the musical. "Till There Was You" was covered by Anita Bryant in 1959 as a single for Carlton Records, reaching No. 30 on the Billboard Hot 100. The Beatles covered "Till There Was You" on their 1963 album With the Beatles (issued on Meet the Beatles! in the United States). Rosemary Willson later told The New York Times that her husband's estate had received more money from the royalties of the Beatles' recordings of "Till There Was You" than it did from the musical's original production.

A cast recording featuring the 2022 revival cast was recorded at Manhattan Center and was released on December 9, 2022 by Accidental Jacket Entertainment, produced by Robert Sher, Brian Gillet and Huck Walton.

== Adaptations ==
Preston starred in the 1962 film adaptation, with Shirley Jones as Marian, Buddy Hackett as Marcellus, Hermione Gingold as Mrs. Shinn and Ron Howard as Winthrop.

A 2003 television film stars Matthew Broderick as Hill and Kristin Chenoweth as Marian, with Victor Garber as Mayor Shinn, Debra Monk as Mrs. Paroo and Molly Shannon as Mrs. Shinn.

== Reception ==
Though West Side Story had opened nearly three months earlier, The Music Man captured audiences, critics and five Tony Awards, including Best Musical. Steven Suskin wrote that it was one of only eight musicals that opened on Broadway between 1943 and 1964 to "unanimous raves from the major first-night newspaper critics". The New York Times theatre critic Brooks Atkinson wrote in his review "If Mark Twain could have collaborated with Vachel Lindsay, they might have devised a rhythmic lark like The Music Man, which is as American as apple pie and a Fourth of July oration.... The Music Man is a marvelous show, rooted in wholesome and comic tradition."

Walter Kerr of the Herald Tribune glowingly described the opening scene of the musical: "It's the beat that does it. The overture of The Music Man drives off with a couple of good, shrill whistles and a heave-ho blast from half the brass in the pit, with the heartier trombonists lurching to their feet in a blare of enthusiasm. The curtain sails up to disclose the most energetic engine on the Rock Island Railroad (circa 1912) hurtling across the proscenium with real smoke pouring out of its smokestack and real steam rolling along the rails". Kerr called Preston "indefatigable: he's got zest and gusto and a great big grin for another slam-bang march tune". Robert Coleman of the New York Daily Mirror wrote that the producer "made a 10-strike in landing Robert Preston for the title role", stating that Preston "paces the piece dynamically, acts ingratiatingly, sings as if he'd been doing it all his life, and offers steps that would score on the cards of dance judges".

Frank Aston of the New York World-Telegram and Sun declared "It deserves to run at least a decade", especially praising Barbara Cook's performance as Marian: "If all our stack-tenders looked, sang, danced, and acted like Miss Barbara, this nation's book learning would be overwhelming". John Chapman of the Daily News pronounced The Music Man "one of the few great musical comedies of the last 26 years", stating that Of Thee I Sing (1931) "set a standard for fun and invention which has seldom been reached. Its equal arrived in 1950 – Guys and Dolls – and I would say that The Music Man ranks with these two". In the Journal-American, John McClain deemed the show "a whopping hit. This salute by Meredith Willson to his native Iowa will make even Oklahoma! look to its laurels".

== In popular culture ==
The Music Man's popularity has led to its being mentioned, quoted, parodied or pastiched in a number of media, including television, films and popular music.

=== Television ===
The Music Man has been parodied in a number of TV shows, including The Simpsons episode "Marge vs. the Monorail", written by Conan O'Brien. At some point during the second Broadway revival, O'Brien was approached about playing the role of Harold Hill for a brief run, but he ultimately could not fit it into his schedule. He says, on the DVD commentary track for the aforementioned Simpsons episode, that it was the hardest choice he's ever had to make professionally, because The Music Man is one of his favorites. O'Brien did, however, as host of the 2006 Emmy Awards, sing a parody version of "Ya Got Trouble" in his opening monologue targeting NBC and their slide in the ratings.

The television program Family Guy has parodied the musical at least three times. In the episode "Brian Wallows and Peter's Swallows", Lois chastises Brian's high standards in a spoof of "Piano Lesson". In another episode, "Patriot Games", Peter showboats after scoring a touchdown by leading a stadium full of people in a rendition of "Shipoopi", complete with choreography from the film. In Episode 22 of Boston Legal, "Men to Boys", Alan Shore sings a parody of the song "Trouble" to convince patrons of a restaurant not to eat the salmon. Several Music Man songs were used in Ally McBeal, for example in the season 2 episode "Sex, Lies and Politics" in which lawyer John Cage spurs the jury into singing "Ya Got Trouble" with him. Season 2 Episode 15 (2012), "The Super Speedy Cider Squeezy 6000", of the TV show My Little Pony: Friendship Is Magic, makes numerous allusions to The Music Man, including a song based on "Ya Got Trouble".

MSNBC's Keith Olbermann has numerous times referred to Fox News TV host Glenn Beck as "Harold Hill" on the air.

Among other performances from The Music Man on the Netflix original series Grace and Frankie, the character Robert (Martin Sheen) stars in a fictional community theater production of the musical in the 2018 episode, "The Rats" (season 4, episode 12). In 2025 The Music Man appears in the HBO Max series It: Welcome to Derry as a plot vehicle in the disappearance of one of the characters. The song "Ya Got Trouble", is featured across multiple episodes.

=== Film ===
In the 1960 film The Apartment, Jack Lemmon's character is given tickets to the show but is stood up at the Majestic Theatre. In Romy and Michele's High School Reunion (1997), Michele sings "The Wells Fargo Wagon". The next year, in The Wedding Singer (1998), Robbie teaches Rosie to sing "'Til There Was You" for her 50th wedding anniversary.

The 2006 mockumentary/documentary Pittsburgh centers on actor Jeff Goldblum as he attempts to secure a green card for his Canadian actor/singer/dancer girlfriend, Catherine Wreford, by appearing with her as the leads in a summer regional theatre production of The Music Man in Goldblum's hometown of Pittsburgh, Pennsylvania.

=== Music ===
The political satire group the Capitol Steps parodies numerous songs from musicals, including The Music Man. To evoke turn of the 20th century Main Street USA at some of its theme parks around the world, Walt Disney Parks and Resorts uses songs from the show, including "76 Trombones" and "Wells Fargo Wagon". Bill Hayes parodied "Rock Island" in a 1959 industrial musical Good News About Olds written by Max Hodge, with Oldsmobile product terminology serving as the "whatayatalk".

The North Iowa Band Festival in Mason City, Iowa, is a yearly event celebrating music with a special emphasis on marching bands. Willson returned several times to his home town of Mason City during the 1950s to participate in the event, including leading the "Big Parade", and the stars of the film version participated in the event in 1962.

== Awards and honors ==
=== Original Broadway production ===
Year	Award Ceremony	Category	Nominee	Result
1958	Tony Award	Best Musical		Won
1958	Tony Award	Best Actor in a Musical	Robert Preston	Won
1958	Tony Award	Best Featured Actress in a Musical	Barbara Cook	Won
1958	Tony Award	Best Featured Actor in a Musical	David Burns	Won
1958	Tony Award	Best Featured Actor in a Musical	Iggie Wolfington	Nominated
1958	Tony Award	Best Direction of a Musical	Morton DaCosta	Nominated
1958	Tony Award	Best Choreography	Onna White	Nominated
1958	Tony Award	Best Conductor and Musical Director	Herbert Greene	Won
1958	Tony Award	Best Stage Technician	Sammy Knapp	Nominated
1958	Theatre World Award		Eddie Hodges	Won
1958	New York Drama Critics' Circle Awards	Best Musical	Meredith Willson	Won
1959	Tony Award	Best Stage Technician	Sammy Knapp	Won

=== 1980 Broadway revival ===
Year	Award Ceremony	Category	Nominee	Result
1981	Theatre World Award		Meg Bussert	Won

=== 2000 Broadway revival ===
Year	Award Ceremony	Category	Nominee	Result
2000	Tony Award	Best Revival of a Musical	Dodger Theatricals, The John F. Kennedy Center, Elizabeth Williams, Anita Waxman, Kardana-Swinsky Productions, Lorie Cowen Levy, Dede Harris	Nominated
2000	Tony Award	Best Actor in a Musical	Craig Bierko	Nominated
2000	Tony Award	Best Actress in a Musical	Rebecca Luker	Nominated
2000	Tony Award	Best Direction of a Musical	Susan Stroman	Nominated
2000	Tony Award	Best Choreography	Susan Stroman	Nominated
2000	Tony Award	Best Orchestrations	Doug Besterman	Nominated
2000	Tony Award	Best Scenic Design	Thomas Lynch	Nominated
2000	Tony Award	Best Costume Design	William Ivey Long	Nominated
2000	Drama Desk Award	Outstanding Revival of a Musical		Nominated
2000	Drama Desk Award	Outstanding Actor in a Musical	Craig Bierko	Nominated
2000	Drama Desk Award	Outstanding Actress in a Musical	Rebecca Luker	Nominated
2000	Drama Desk Award	Outstanding Director of a Musical	Susan Stroman	Nominated
2000	Drama Desk Award	Outstanding Choreography	Susan Stroman	Nominated
2000	Drama Desk Award	Outstanding Orchestrations	Doug Besterman	Nominated
2000	Drama Desk Award	Outstanding Set Design	Thomas Lynch	Nominated
2000	Drama Desk Award	Outstanding Costume Design	William Ivey Long	Nominated
2000	Theatre World Award		Craig Bierko	Won

=== 2022 Broadway revival ===
Year	Award Ceremony	Category	Nominee	Result
2022
2022	Tony Awards			
2022	Tony Awards	Best Revival of a Musical		Nominated
2022	Tony Awards	Best Actor in a Musical	Hugh Jackman	Nominated
2022	Tony Awards	Best Actress in a Musical	Sutton Foster	Nominated
2022	Tony Awards	Best Featured Actress in a Musical	Jayne Houdyshell	Nominated
2022	Tony Awards	Best Costume Design of a Musical	Santo Loquasto	Nominated
2022	Tony Awards	Best Choreography	Warren Carlyle	Nominated
2022	Drama Desk Awards	Outstanding Costume Design of a Musical	Santo Loquasto	Nominated
2022	Drama League Awards	Outstanding Revival of a Broadway or Off-Broadway Musical		Nominated
2022	Drama League Awards	Outstanding Direction of a Musical	Jerry Zaks	Nominated
2022	Drama League Awards	Distinguished Performance	Sutton Foster	Won
2022	Drama League Awards	Distinguished Achievement in Musical Theatre Award	Hugh Jackman	Won
2022	Outer Critics Circle Awards	Outstanding Revival of a Musical (Broadway or Off-Broadway)		Nominated
2022	Outer Critics Circle Awards	Outstanding Choreography	Warren Carlyle	Nominated
2022	Outer Critics Circle Awards	Outstanding Costume Design (Play or Musical)	Santo Loquasto	Nominated
2022	Theatre World Award	Best Debut Ensemble		Won
2022	Chita Rivera Awards	Outstanding Choreography in a Broadway Show	Warren Carlyle	Nominated
2022	Chita Rivera Awards	Outstanding Ensemble in a Broadway Show		Nominated
2022	Chita Rivera Awards	Outstanding Male Dancer in a Broadway Show	Hugh Jackman	Nominated
2022	Chita Rivera Awards	Outstanding Female Dancer in a Broadway Show	Sutton Foster	Nominated

== Sources ==
- Cabaniss, Mark (September 15, 2022). Miracle of The Music Man: The Classic American Story of Meredith Willson. Bloomsbury Publishing PLC. ISBN 978-1-5381-5465-6.
- Willson, Meredith; Feinstein, Michael (2020). "But He Doesn't Know the Territory": The Story behind Meredith Willson's The Music Man (Second ed.). Minneapolis: University of Minnesota Press. ISBN 978-1-4529-6502-4. OCLC 1191777744.
- Skipper, John (2000). Meredith Willson: The Unsinkable Music Man. Savas Publishing Company. ISBN 978-1882810789.
